= Buffalo, New York =

Buffalo
- City
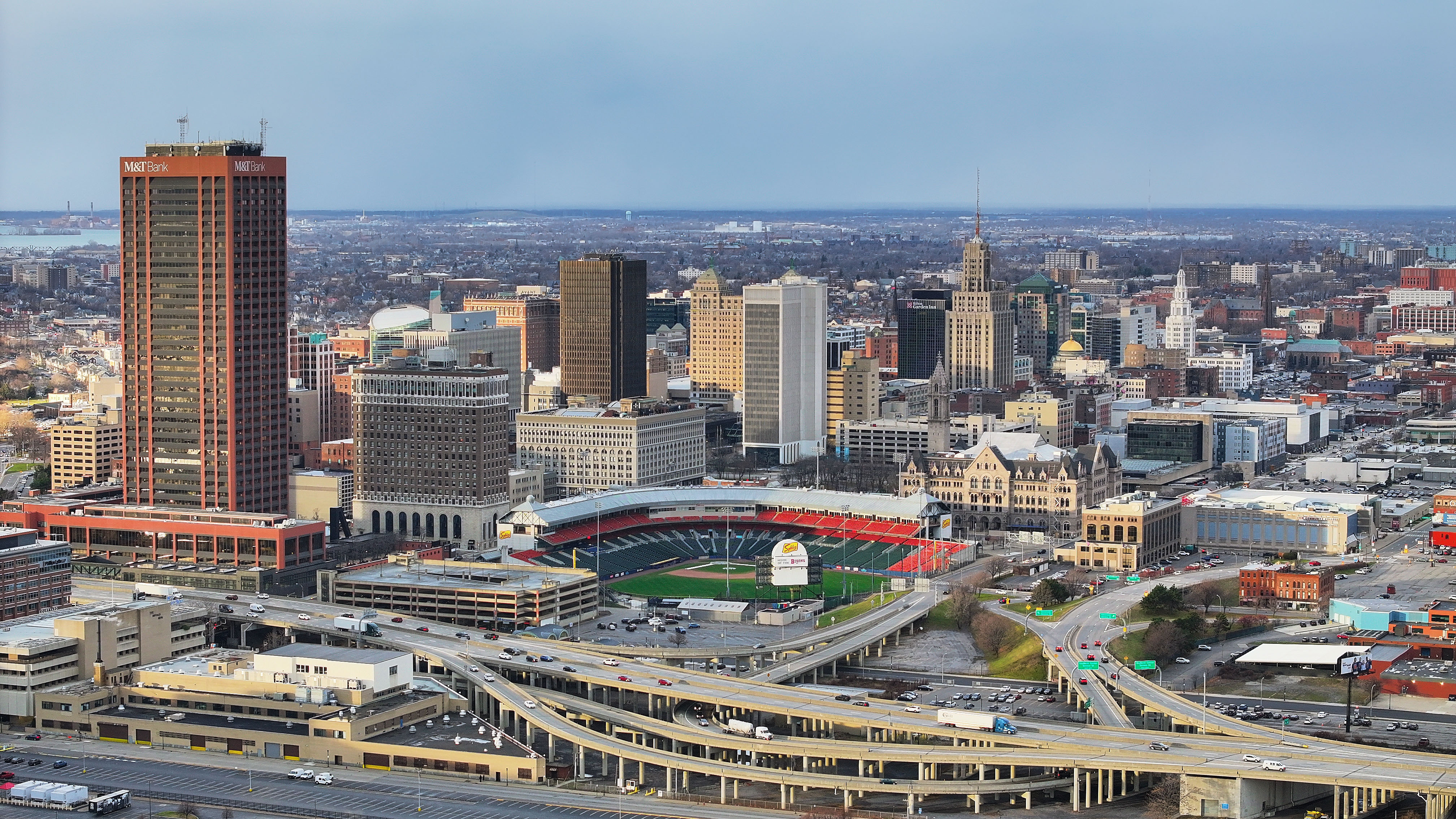
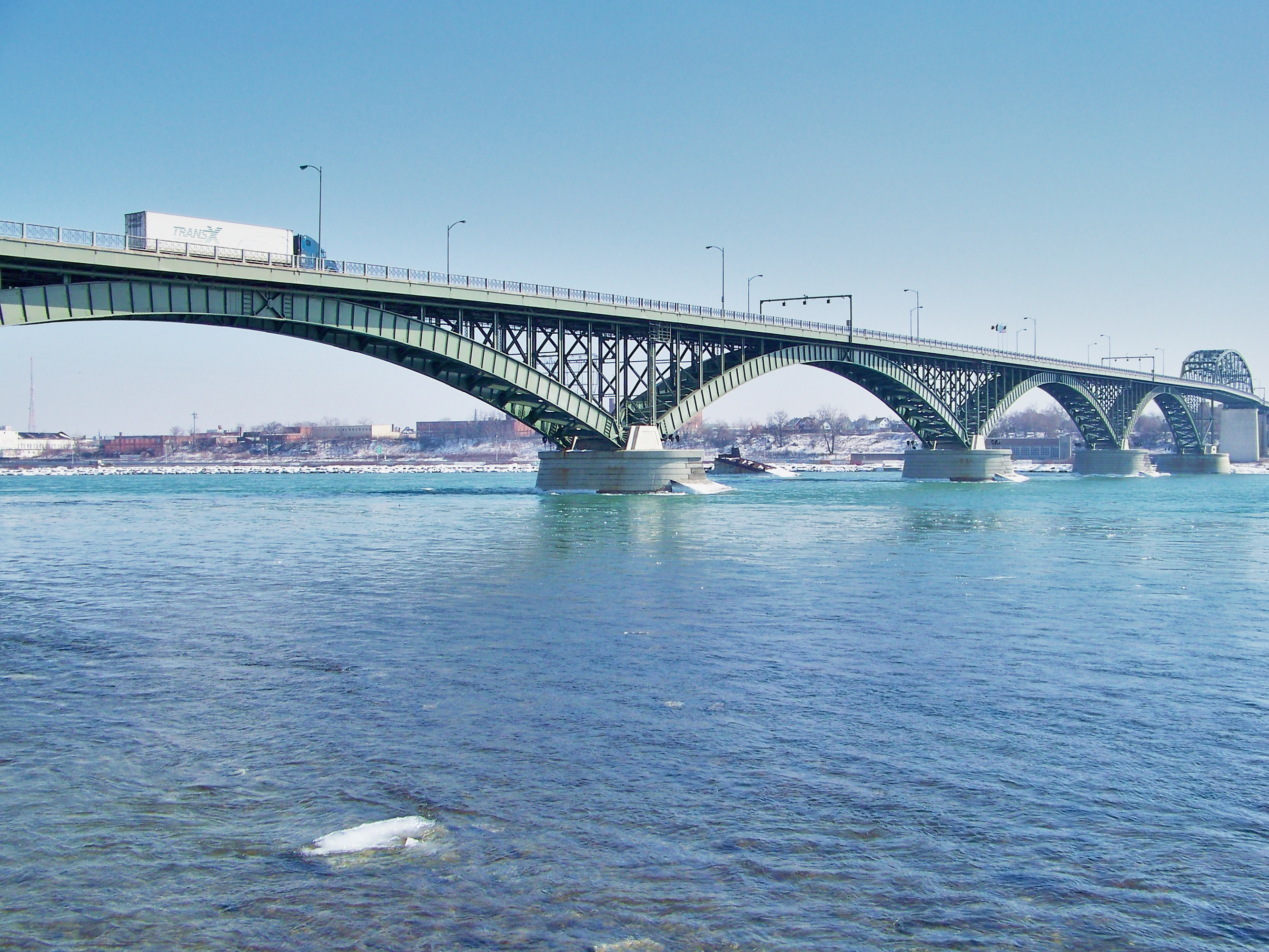
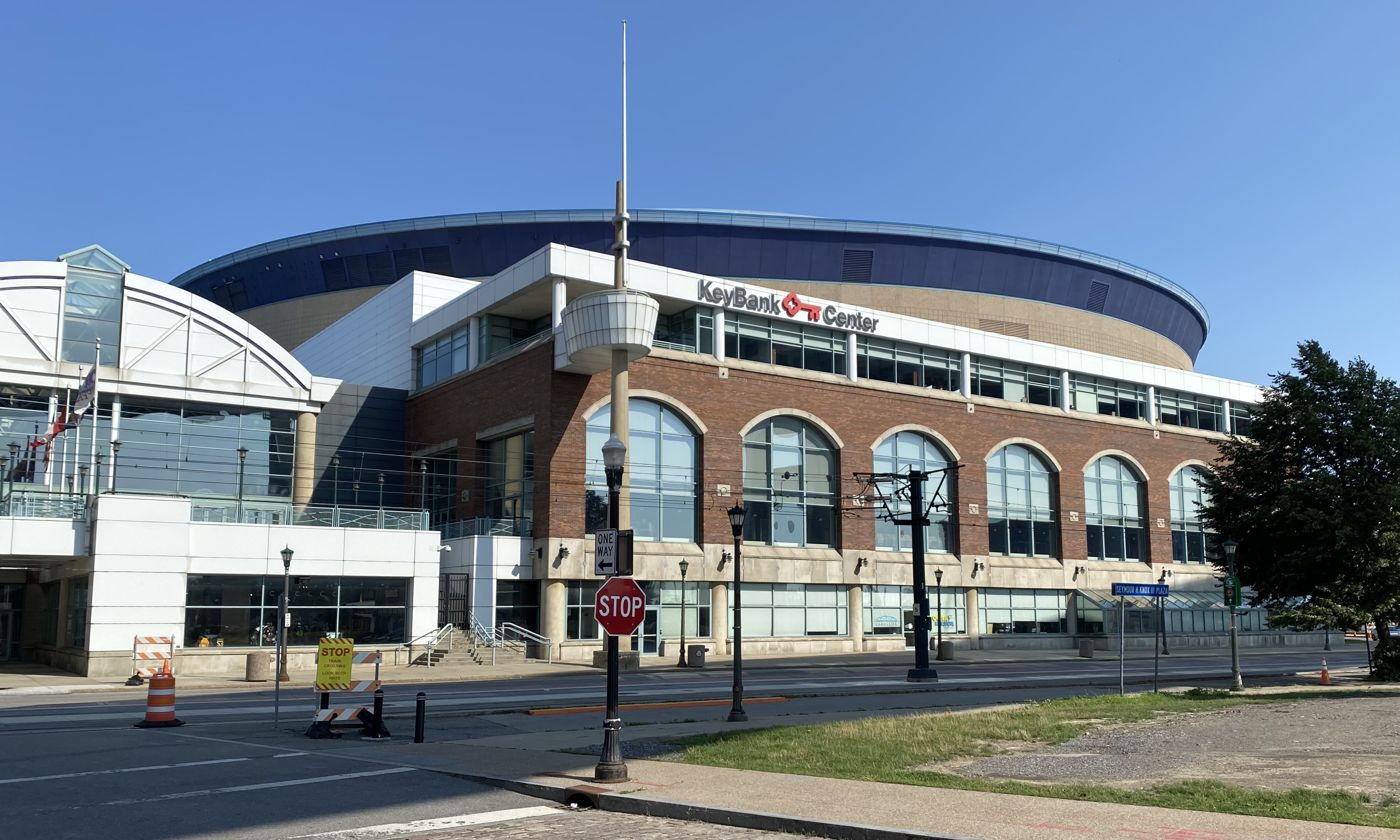
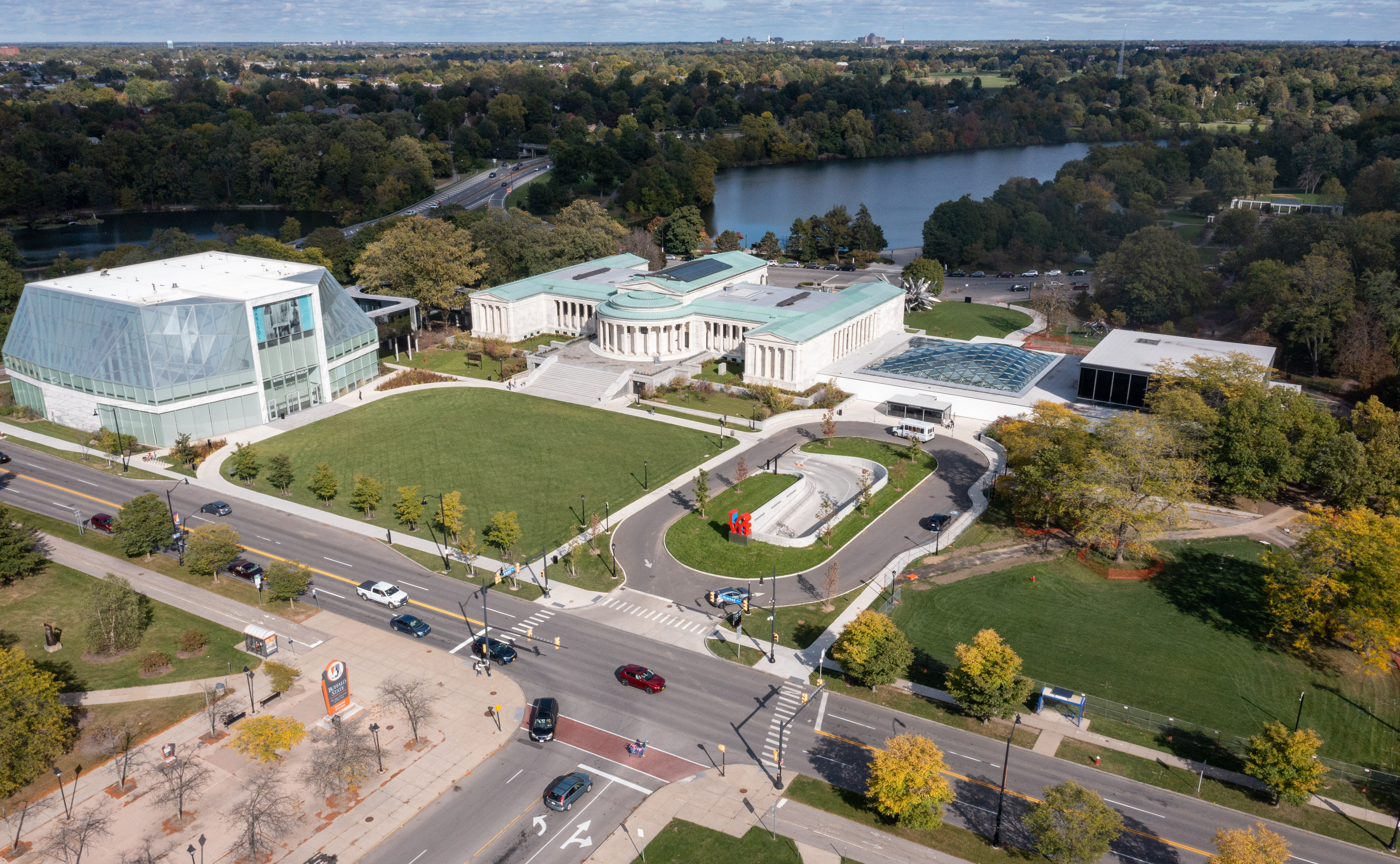
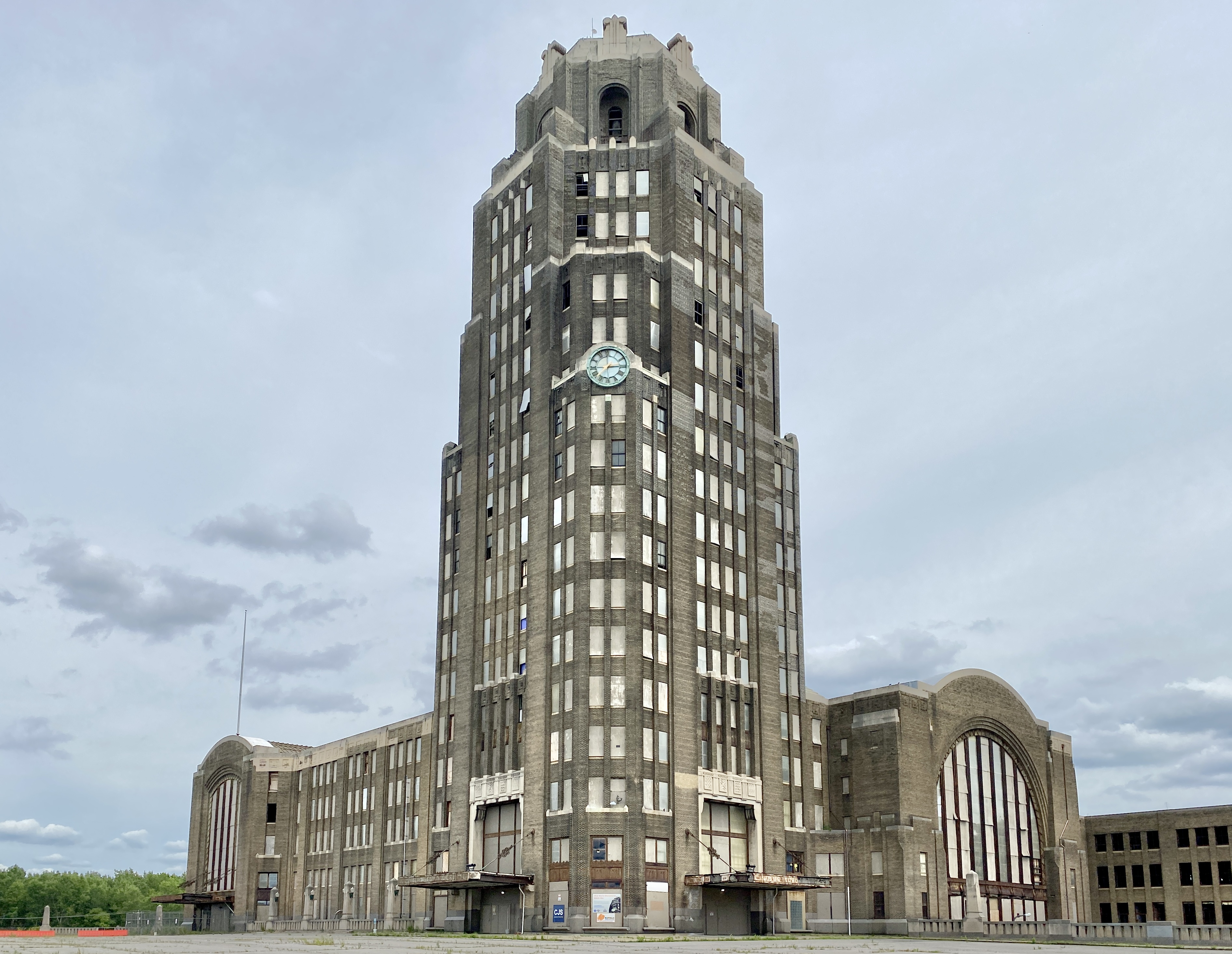
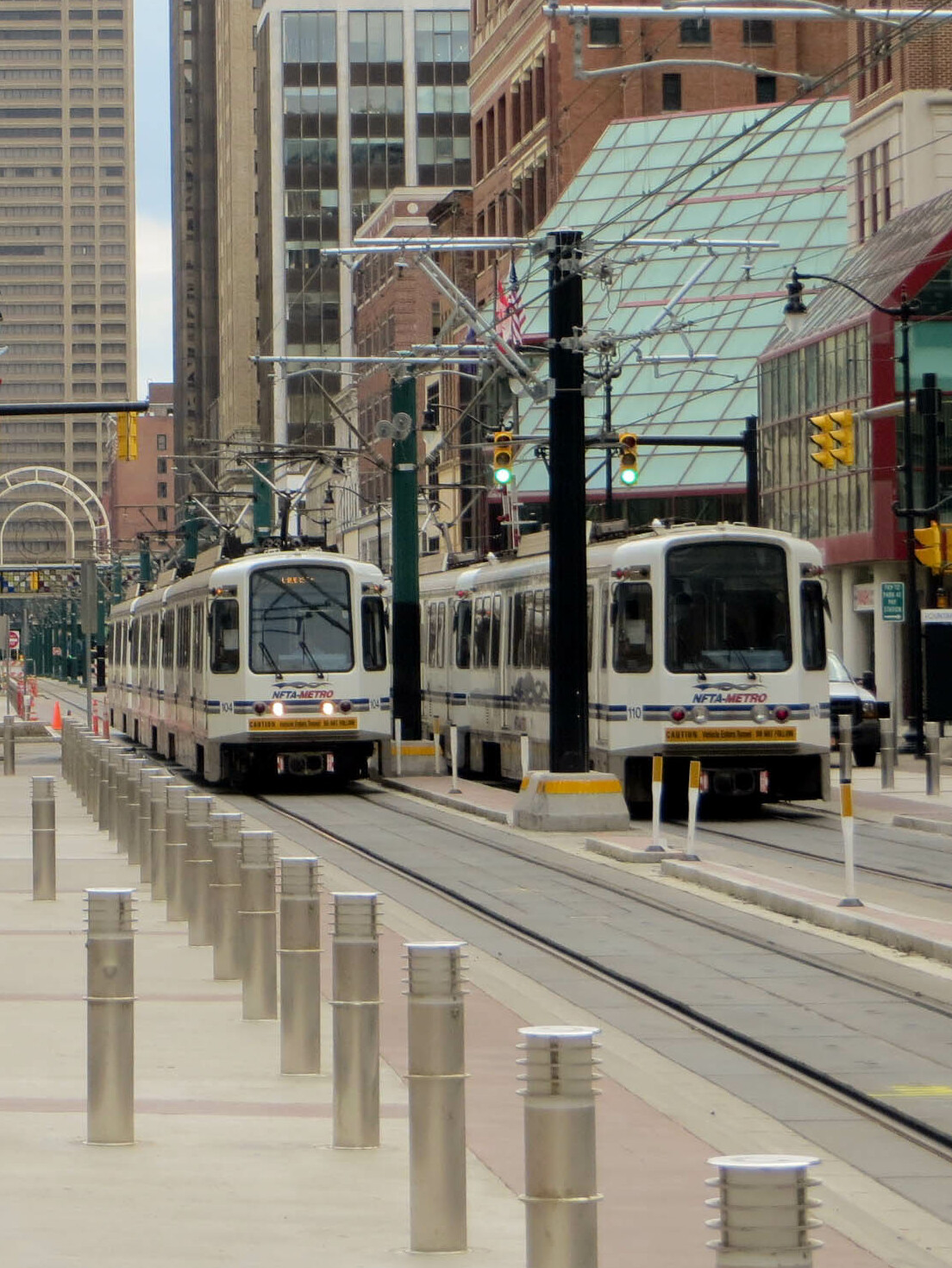
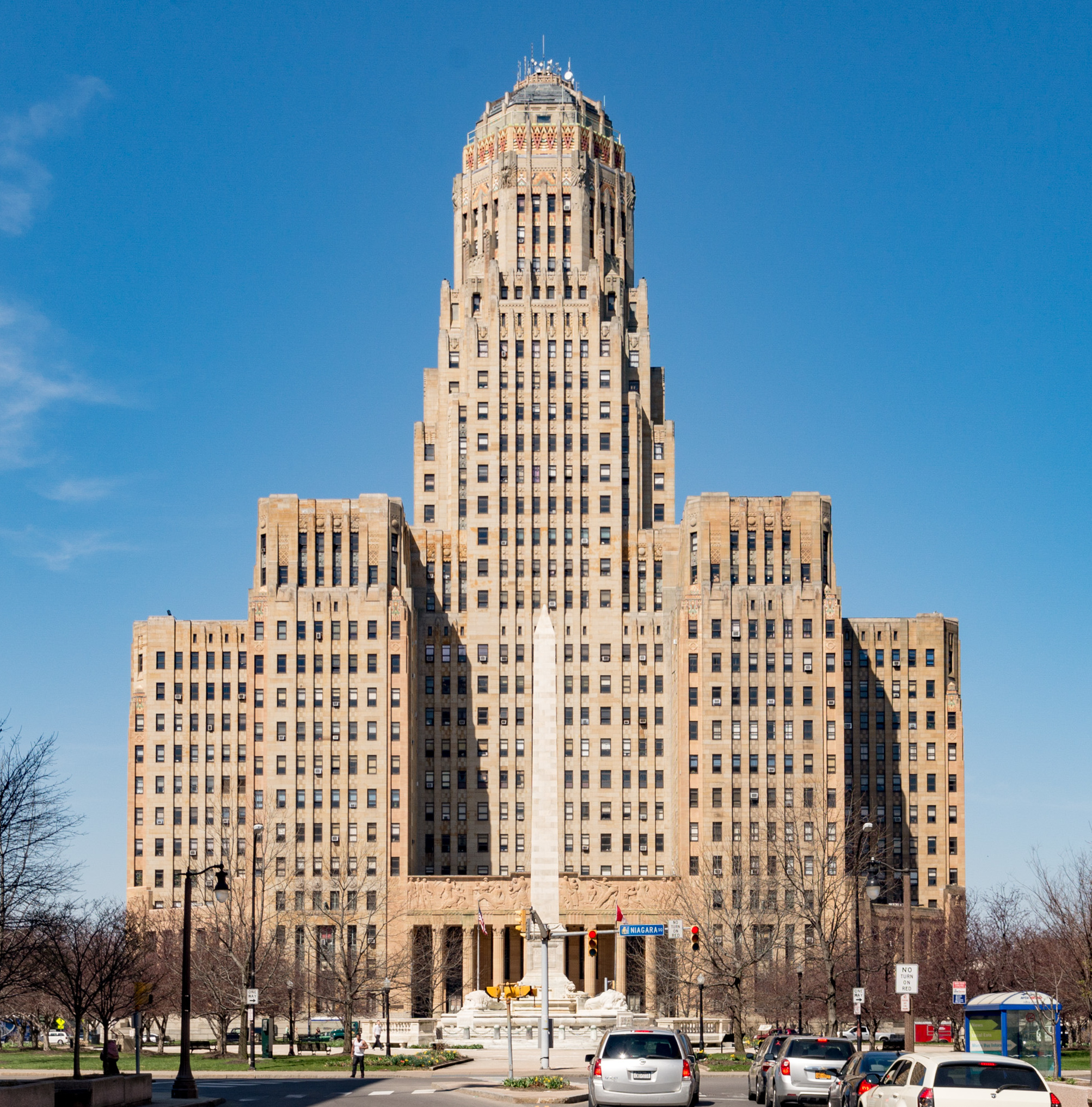
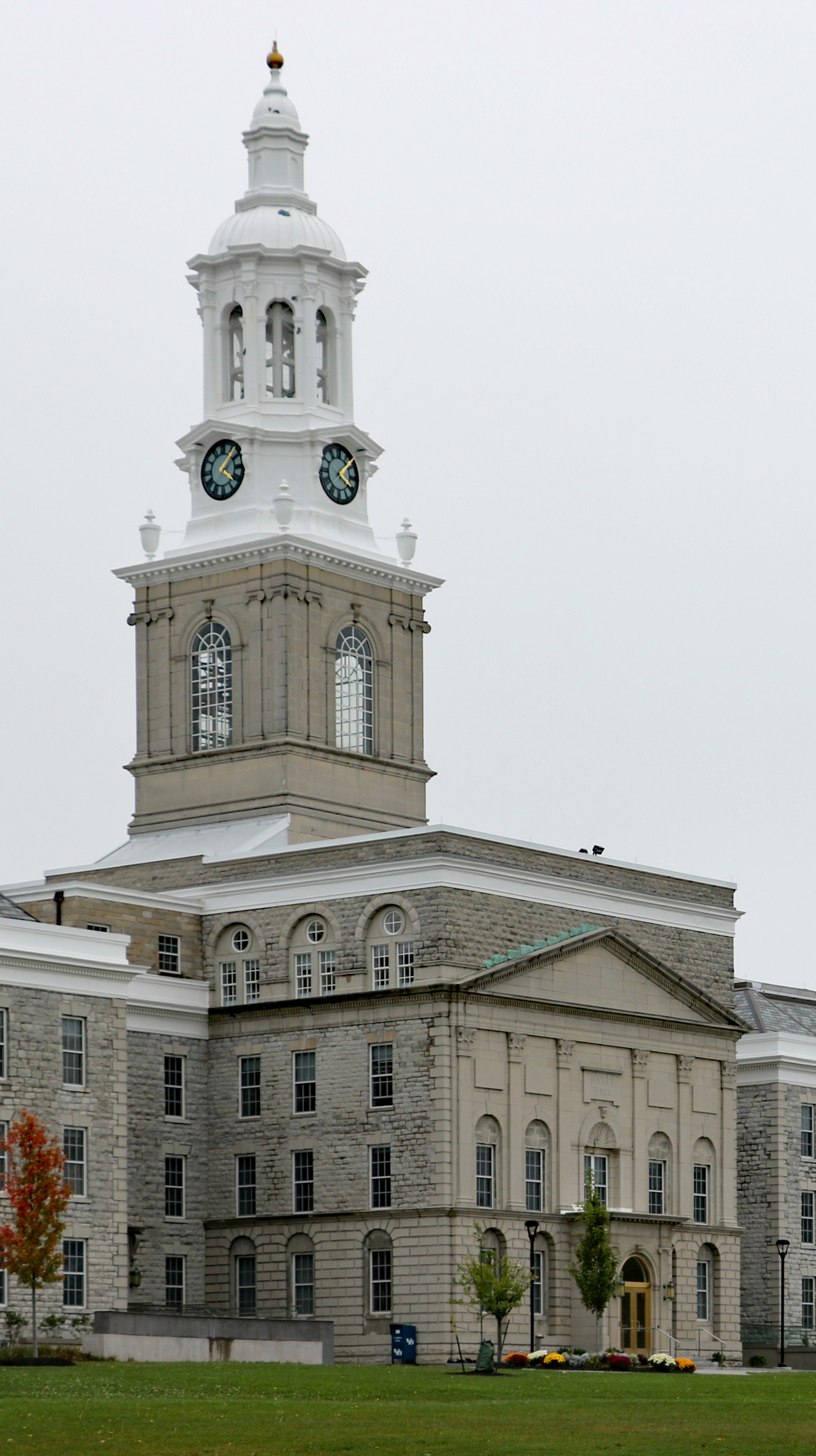
- Aerial view of downtown from the southeast Peace Bridge KeyBank Center Buffalo AKG Art Museum Buffalo Central Terminal NFTA Metro Rail Buffalo City Hall Hayes Hall

- Flag Seal
- Etymology: Named after the nearby Buffalo Creek, which was named by French and Moravian explorers
- Nicknames: Queen City, City of Good Neighbors, City of No Illusions, Nickel City, Queen City of the Lakes, City of Light, The Electric City, City of Trees
- Interactive map of Buffalo
- Location within New York Location within the United States
- Coordinates: 42°53′11″N 78°52′41″W
- Country: United States
- State: New York
- Region: Western New York
- Metro: Buffalo–Niagara Falls
- County: Erie
- First settled (village): 1789; 237 years ago
- Founded: 1801; 225 years ago
- Incorporated (city): 1832; 194 years ago
- Named for: Buffalo River

Government
  - Type: Strong mayor–council
  - Body: Buffalo Common Council
  - Mayor: Sean Ryan (D)

Area
  - City: 52.48 sq mi (135.92 km^{2})
  - Land: 40.38 sq mi (104.58 km^{2})
  - Water: 12.10 sq mi (31.34 km^{2})
- Elevation: 600 ft (180 m)

Population (2020)
  - City: 278,349
  - Rank: US: 80th NY: 2nd
  - Density: 6,893.5/sq mi (2,661.58/km^{2})
  - Urban: 948,864 (US: 50th)
  - Urban density: 2,787/sq mi (1,075.9/km^{2})
  - Metro: 1,125,637 (US: 49th)
- Demonyms: Buffalonian

GDP
  - Metro: $90.716 billion (2023)
- Time zone: UTC– 05:00 (EST)
  - Summer (DST): UTC– 04:00 (EDT)
- ZIP Code: 142XX
- Area codes: 716, 624
- FIPS code: 36-11000
- GNIS feature ID: 0973345
- Website: buffalony.gov

Buffalo is a city in the U.S. state of New York. It lies in Western New York on the eastern shore of Lake Erie and at the head of the Niagara River on the Canada–United States border, with a population of 278,349 at the 2020 census. The Buffalo–Niagara Falls metropolitan area, with over 1.23 million residents, is the second-largest metropolitan area in New York State behind only the New York City metropolitan area, and the 51st-largest metropolitan area in the United States. Buffalo is the county seat of Erie County.

Before the 17th century, the Buffalo region was inhabited by nomadic Paleo-Indians who were succeeded by the Neutral, Erie, and Haudenosaunee conferencies. By the early 17th century, the French began to explore the region. In the 18th century, Haudenosaunee land surrounding Buffalo Creek was ceded through the Holland Land Purchase, and a small village was established at its headwaters. Buffalo was selected as the terminus of the Erie Canal in 1825, which led to its incorporation in 1832 and stimulated its growth as the primary inland port between the Great Lakes and Atlantic Ocean. Transshipment made Buffalo the world's largest grain port in that era.

After the coming of railroads greatly reduced the canal's importance, Buffalo became the second-largest railway hub in the U.S. (after Chicago), and the city came to be dominated by steel production by the 20th century. Later, de-industrialization and the opening of the St. Lawrence Seaway saw the city's economy decline and diversify. It developed its service industries, such as health care, retail, tourism, logistics, and education, while retaining some manufacturing. In 2023, the gross domestic product of the Buffalo–Niagara Falls metropolitan area was approximately $90.7 billion (equivalent to about $112.5 billion in 2025).

Buffalo's cultural landmarks include the oldest urban parks system in the United States, the Buffalo AKG Art Museum, the Buffalo History Museum, the Buffalo Philharmonic Orchestra, Shea's Performing Arts Center, the Buffalo Museum of Science, and several annual festivals. Its educational institutions include the University at Buffalo, Buffalo State University, Canisius University, and D'Youville University. Buffalo is also known for its winter weather, Buffalo wings, and two major league professional sports teams: the Buffalo Bills (NFL) and Buffalo Sabres (NHL).

== History ==
=== Pre-Columbian era to European exploration ===
Approximate extent of Wenro territory c. 1630

Before the arrival of Europeans, nomadic Paleo-Indians inhabited the western New York region from the 8th millennium BCE. The Woodland period began around 1000 BC, marked by the rise of the Haudenosaunee Confederacy and the spread of its tribes throughout the state. Seventeenth-century Jesuit missionaries were the first Europeans to visit the area.

During French exploration of the region in 1620, the region was sparsely populated and occupied by the agrarian Erie people in the south and the Neutral Nation in the north, with a relatively small tribe, the Wenrohronon, between and the Seneca, a Haudenosaunee tribe, occupying the land just east of the region. The Neutral grew tobacco and Indian hemp to trade with the Haudenosaunee, who traded furs with the French for European goods. The tribes used animal and war paths to travel and move goods across what today is New York State. (Centuries later, these same paths were gradually improved, then paved, then developed into major modern roads.) Traditional Seneca oral legends, as recounted by professional storytellers known as Hagéotâ, were highly participatory.

These tales were told only during winter, as they were believed to have the power to put even animals and plants to sleep, which could affect the harvest. At the conclusion, audience members typically offered gifts, such as tobacco, to the storyteller as a sign of appreciation. During the Beaver Wars in the mid-17th century the Senecas conquered the Erie and Neutrals in the region. Native Americans did not settle along Buffalo Creek permanently until 1780, when displaced Senecas were relocated from Fort Niagara. The Seneca town of Došowëh, meaning "Between the basswoods," was historically located on Buffalo Creek, and Došowëh continues to be used as the Seneca name for the modern city of Buffalo.

Louis Hennepin and Sieur de La Salle explored the upper Niagara and Ontario regions in the late 1670s. In 1679, La Salle's ship, Le Griffon, became the first to sail above Niagara Falls near Cayuga Creek. Baron de Lahontan visited the site of Buffalo in 1687. A small French settlement along Buffalo Creek lasted for only a year (1758). After the French and Indian War, the region was ruled by Britain. After the American Revolution, the Province of New York—now a U.S. state—began westward expansion, looking for arable land by following the Haudenosaunee.

New York and Massachusetts were vying for the territory which included Buffalo, and Massachusetts had the right to purchase all but a one-mile-wide (1600 m) portion of land. The rights to the Massachusetts territories were sold to Robert Morris in 1791. Despite objections from Seneca chief Red Jacket, Morris brokered a deal between fellow chief Cornplanter and the Dutch dummy corporation Holland Land Company. (Note: Foreign entities were not allowed to own land in New York State until 1798 (Goldman 1983a, p. 27).) The Holland Land Purchase gave the Senecas three reservations, and the Holland Land Company received 4,000,000 acres (16,000 km^{2}) for about thirty-three cents per acre.

Permanent white settlers along the creek were prisoners captured during the Revolutionary War. Early landowners were Haudenosaunee interpreter Captain William Johnston, former enslaved man Joseph "Black Joe" Hodges and Cornelius Winney, a Dutch trader who arrived in 1789. As a result of the war, in which the Haudenosaunee sided with the British Army, Haudenosaunee territory was gradually reduced in the late 18th century by European settlers through successive statewide treaties which included the Treaty of Fort Stanwix (1784) and the First Treaty of Buffalo Creek (1788). The Haudenosaunee were moved onto reservations, including Buffalo Creek. By the end of the 18th century, only 338 mi^{2} (216,000 acres; 880 km^{2}; 88,000 ha) of reservations remained.

After the Treaty of Big Tree removed Haudenosaunee title to lands west of the Genesee River in 1797, Joseph Ellicott surveyed land at the mouth of Buffalo Creek. In the middle of the village was an intersection of eight streets at present-day Niagara Square. Originally named New Amsterdam, its name was soon changed to Buffalo.

=== Erie Canal, grain and commerce ===
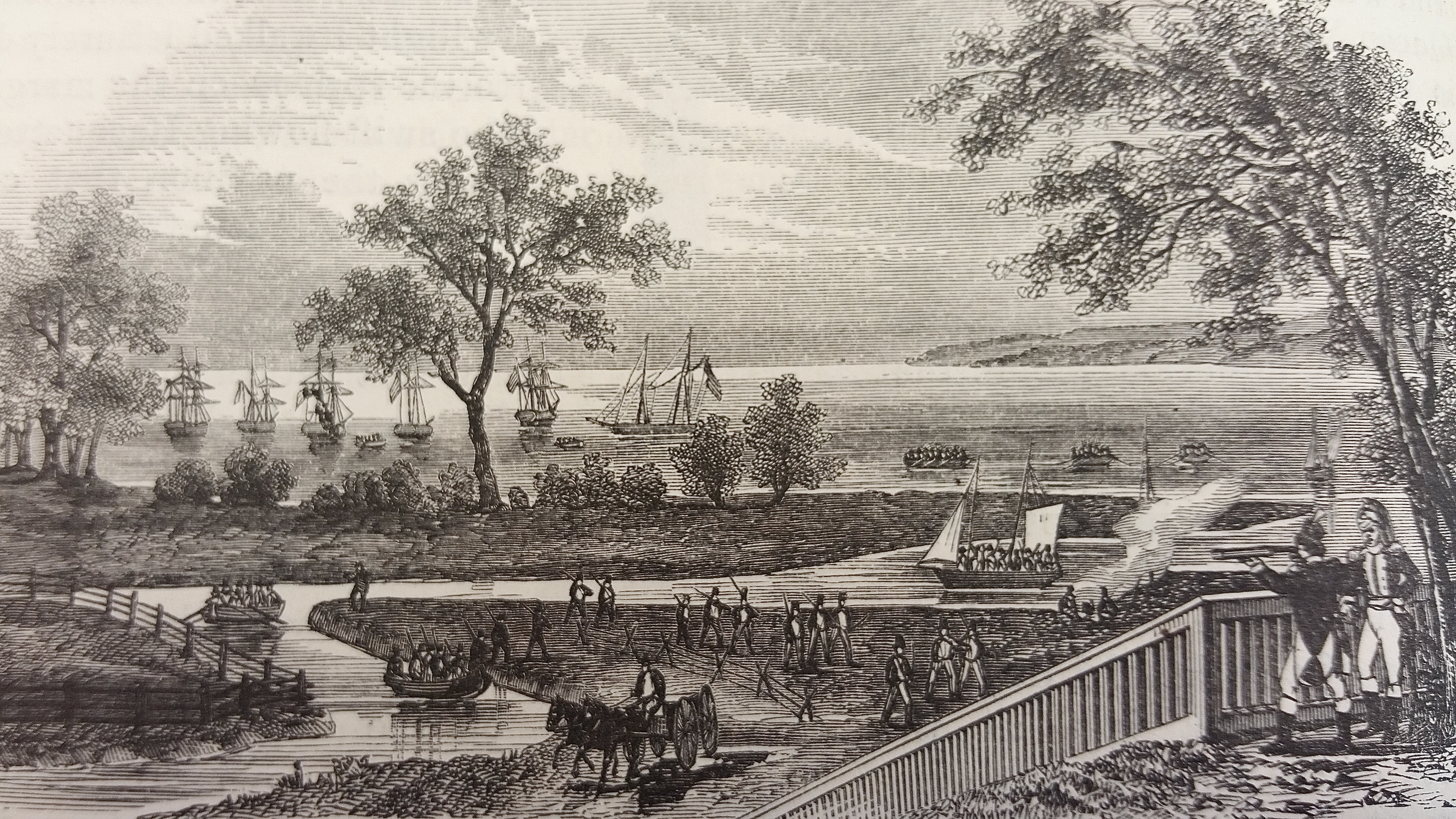
Buffalo in 1813

The village of Buffalo was named for Buffalo Creek. (Note: Sources disagree on the creek's etymology. Although its name possibly originated from French fur traders and Native Americans calling the creek Beau Fleuve (French for "beautiful river"), Buffalo Creek may have been named after the American buffalo (whose range may have extended into Western New York).) British military engineer John Montresor referred to "Buffalo Creek" in his 1764 journal, the earliest recorded appearance of the name. A road to Pennsylvania from Buffalo was built in 1802 for migrants traveling to the Connecticut Western Reserve in Ohio. Before an east–west turnpike across the state was completed, traveling from Albany to Buffalo would take a week; a trip from nearby Williamsville to Batavia could take over three days. (Note: When traveling with an ox and wagon team.)

British forces burned Buffalo and the northwestern village of Black Rock in 1813. The battle and subsequent fire was in response to the destruction of Newark (later named Niagara-on-the-Lake) by American forces and other skirmishes during the War of 1812. Rebuilding was swift, completed in 1815. As a remote outpost, village residents hoped that the proposed Erie Canal would bring prosperity to the area. To accomplish this, Buffalo's harbor was expanded with the help of Samuel Wilkeson; it was selected as the canal's terminus over the rival Black Rock. It opened in 1825, ushering in commerce, manufacturing and hydropower. By the following year, the 130 sq mi (340 km^{2}) Buffalo Creek Reservation (at the western border of the village) was transferred to Buffalo. Buffalo was incorporated as a city in 1832. During the 1830s, businessman Benjamin Rathbun significantly expanded its business district. The city doubled in size from 1845 to 1855. Almost two-thirds of the city's population was foreign-born, largely a mix of unskilled (or educated) Irish and German Catholics.

Fugitive slaves made their way north to Buffalo during the 1840s and 1850s. Buffalo was a terminus of the Underground Railroad, with many free Black people crossing the Niagara River to Fort Erie, Canada West; others remained in Buffalo. During this time, Buffalo's port continued to develop. Passenger and commercial traffic expanded, leading to the creation of feeder canals and the expansion of the city's harbor. Unloading grain in Buffalo was a laborious job, and grain handlers working on lake freighters would make $1.50 a day (equivalent to $52 in 2025) in a six-day work week. Local inventor Joseph Dart and engineer Robert Dunbar created the grain elevator in 1843, adapting the steam-powered elevator. Dart's Elevator initially processed one thousand bushels per hour, speeding global distribution to consumers. Buffalo was the transshipment hub of the Great Lakes, and weather, maritime and political events in other Great Lakes cities had a direct impact on the city's economy. In addition to grain, Buffalo's primary imports included agricultural products from the Midwest (meat, whiskey, lumber and tobacco), and its exports included leather, ships and iron products. The mid-19th century saw the rise of new manufacturing capabilities, particularly with iron.

By the 1860s, many railroads terminated in Buffalo; they included the Buffalo, Bradford and Pittsburgh Railroad, Buffalo and Erie Railroad, the New York Central Railroad, and the Lehigh Valley Railroad. During this time, Buffalo controlled one-quarter of all shipping traffic on Lake Erie. After the Civil War, canal traffic began to drop as railroads expanded into Buffalo. Unionization began to take hold in the late 19th century, highlighted by the Great Railroad Strike of 1877 and 1892 Buffalo switchmen's strike.

=== Steel, challenges, and the modern era ===
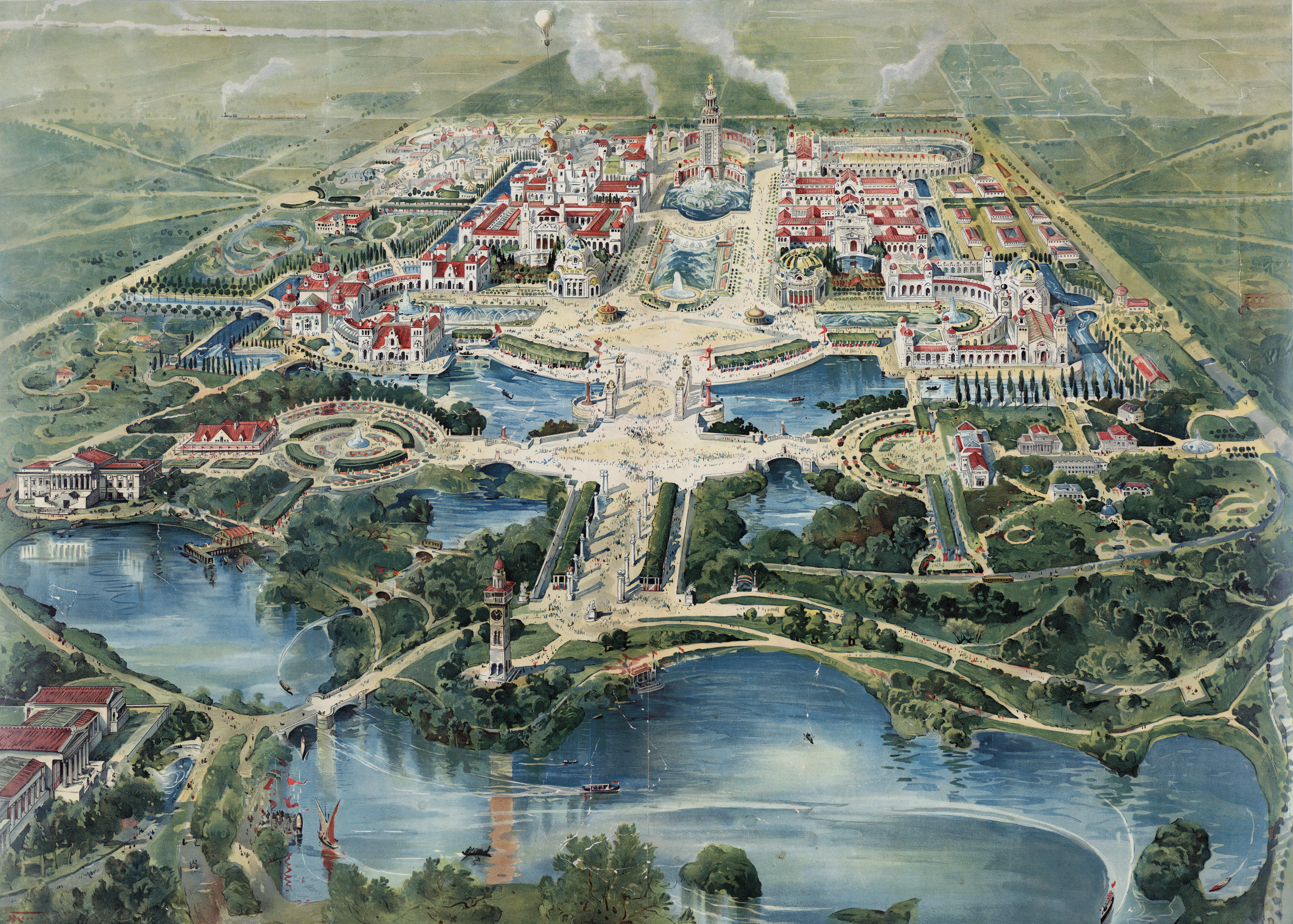
Pan-American Exposition, 1901

At the start of the 20th century, Buffalo was the world's leading grain port and a national flour-milling hub. Local mills were among the first to benefit from hydroelectricity generated by the Niagara River. Buffalo hosted the 1901 Pan-American Exposition after the Spanish–American War, showcasing the nation's advances in art, architecture, and electricity. Its centerpiece was the Electric Tower, with over two million light bulbs, but some exhibits were jingoistic and racially charged. At the exposition, President William McKinley was assassinated by anarchist Leon Czolgosz. When McKinley died, Theodore Roosevelt was sworn in at the Wilcox Mansion in Buffalo.

Attorney John Milburn and local industrialists convinced the Lackawanna Iron and Steel Company to relocate from Scranton, Pennsylvania to the town of West Seneca in 1904. Employment was competitive, with many Eastern Europeans and Scrantonians vying for jobs. From the late 19th century to the 1920s, mergers and acquisitions led to distant ownership of local companies; this had a negative effect on the city's economy. Examples include the acquisition of Lackawanna Steel by Bethlehem Steel and, later, the relocation of Curtiss-Wright in the 1940s. The Great Depression saw severe unemployment, especially among the working class. New Deal relief programs operated in full force, and the city became a stronghold of labor unions and the Democratic Party.

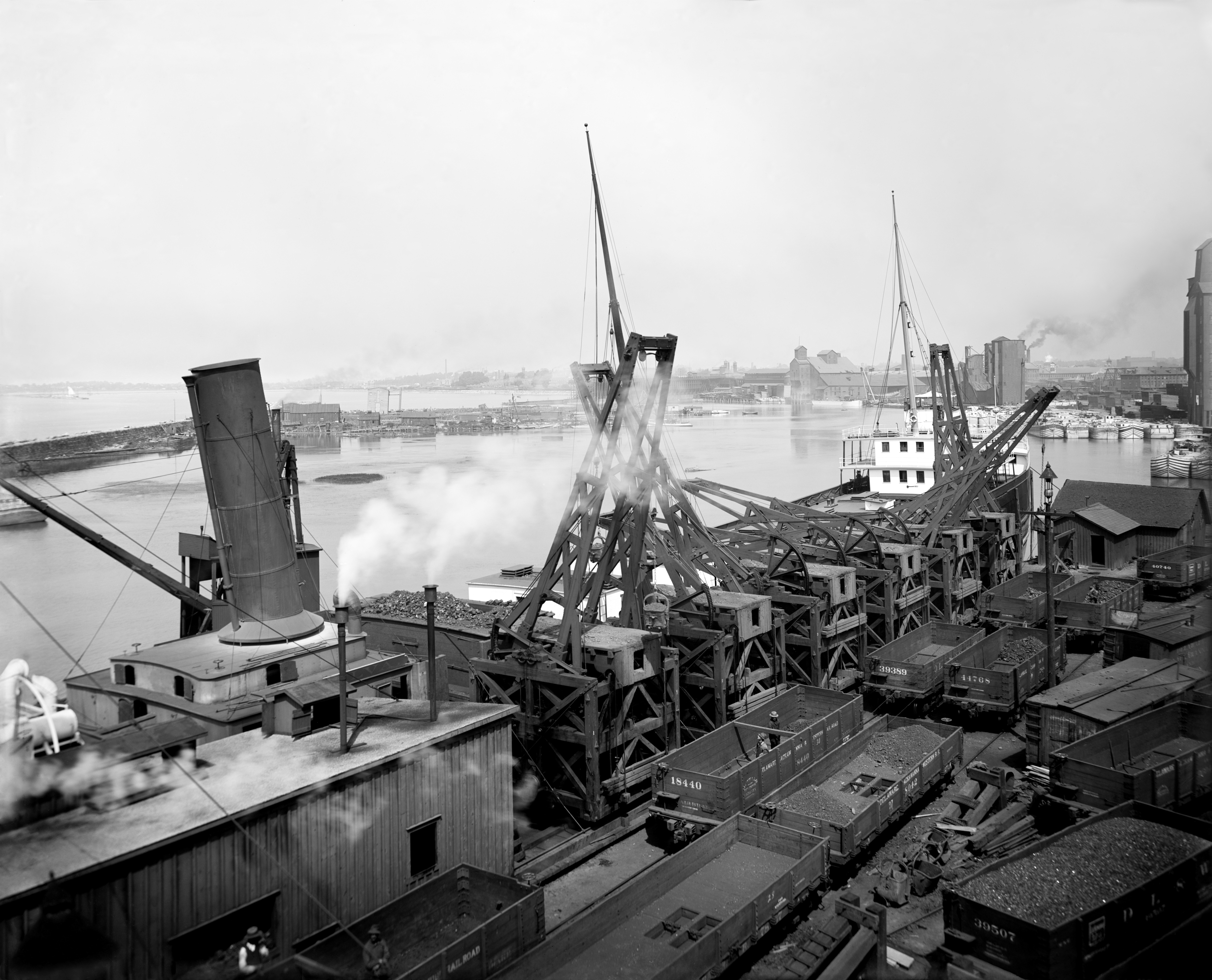
Iron ore unloaded at Buffalo, c. 1900

During World War II, Buffalo regained its manufacturing strength as military contracts enabled the city to manufacture steel, chemicals, aircraft, trucks and ammunition. The 15th-most-populous US city in 1950, Buffalo's economy relied almost entirely on manufacturing; eighty percent of area jobs were in the sector. The city also had over a dozen railway terminals, as railroads remained a significant industry.

The St. Lawrence Seaway was proposed in the 19th century as a faster shipping route to Europe, and later as part of a bi-national hydroelectric project with Canada. Its combination with an expanded Welland Canal led to a grim outlook for Buffalo's economy. After its 1959 opening, the city's port and barge canal became largely irrelevant. Shipbuilding in Buffalo wound down in the 1960s due to reduced waterfront activity, ending an industry which had been part of the city's economy since 1812. Downsizing of the steel mills was attributed to the threat of higher wages and unionization efforts. Racial tensions culminated in riots in 1967. Suburbanization led to the selection of the town of Amherst for the new University at Buffalo campus by 1970. Unwilling to modernize its plant, Bethlehem Steel began cutting thousands of jobs in Lackawanna during the mid-1970s before closing it in 1983. The region lost at least 70,000 jobs between 1970 and 1984. Like much of the Rust Belt, Buffalo has focused on recovering from the effects of late-20th-century deindustrialization.

Panorama of downtown Buffalo and its waterfront in 1880

== Geography ==
=== Topography ===
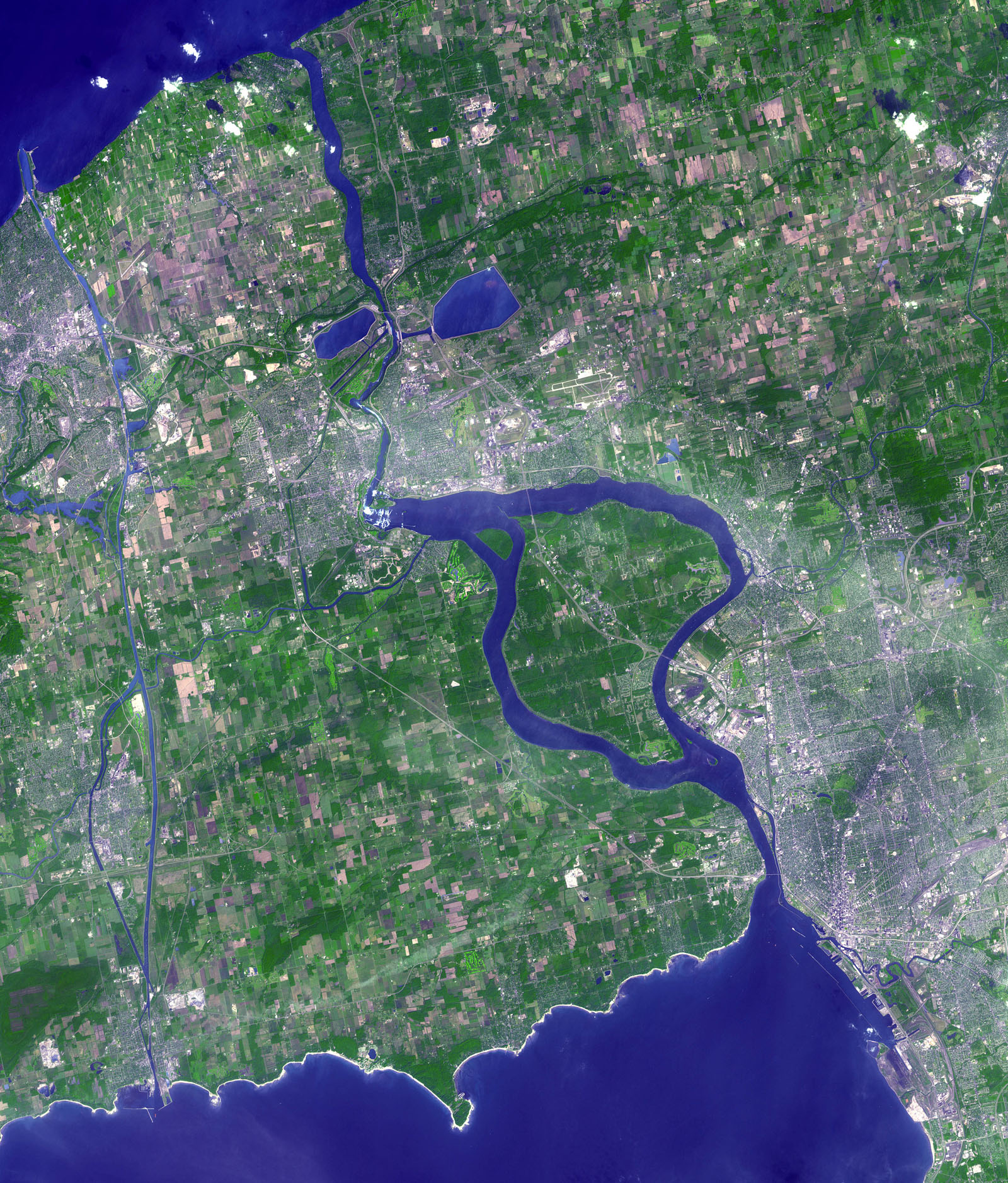
Satellite image of the Niagara Peninsula and Niagara Frontier; Buffalo is at the lower right.

Buffalo is on the eastern end of Lake Erie opposite Fort Erie, Ontario. It is at the head of the Niagara River, which flows north over Niagara Falls into Lake Ontario.

The Buffalo metropolitan area is on the Erie/Ontario Lake Plain of the Eastern Great Lakes Lowlands, a narrow plain extending east to Utica, New York. The city is generally flat, except for elevation changes in the University Heights and Fruit Belt neighborhoods. The Southtowns are hillier, leading to the Cattaraugus Hills in the Appalachian Upland. Several types of shale, limestone and lagerstätten are prevalent in Buffalo and its surrounding area, lining their stream beds.

According to Fox Weather, Buffalo is one of the top five snowiest large cities in the country, receiving, on average, 95 inches of snow annually.

Although the city has not experienced any recent or significant earthquakes, Buffalo is in the Southern Great Lakes Seismic Zone (part of the Great Lakes tectonic zone). Buffalo has four channels within its boundaries: the Niagara River, Buffalo River (and Creek), Scajaquada Creek, and the Black Rock Canal, adjacent to the Niagara River. The city's Bureau of Forestry maintains a database of over seventy thousand trees.

According to the United States Census Bureau, Buffalo has an area of 52.5 sq mi (136 km^{2}); 40.38 sq mi (104.6 km^{2}) is land, and the rest is water. The city's total area is 22.66 percent water. In 2010, its population density was 6,470.6 per square mile.

=== Cityscape ===
Buffalo's architecture is diverse, with a collection of 19th- and 20th-century buildings. Downtown Buffalo landmarks include Louis Sullivan's Guaranty Building, an early skyscraper; the Ellicott Square Building, once one of the largest of its kind in the world; the Art Deco Buffalo City Hall and the McKinley Monument, and the Electric Tower. Beyond downtown, the Buffalo Central Terminal was built in the Broadway-Fillmore neighborhood in 1929; the Richardson Olmsted Complex, built in 1881, was an insane asylum until its closure in the 1970s. Urban renewal from the 1950s to the 1970s spawned the Brutalist-style Buffalo City Court Building and Seneca One Tower, the city's tallest building. In the city's Parkside neighborhood, the Darwin D. Martin House was designed by Frank Lloyd Wright in his Prairie School style. Since 2016, Washington DC real estate developer Douglas Jemal has been acquiring, and redeveloping, iconic properties throughout the city.

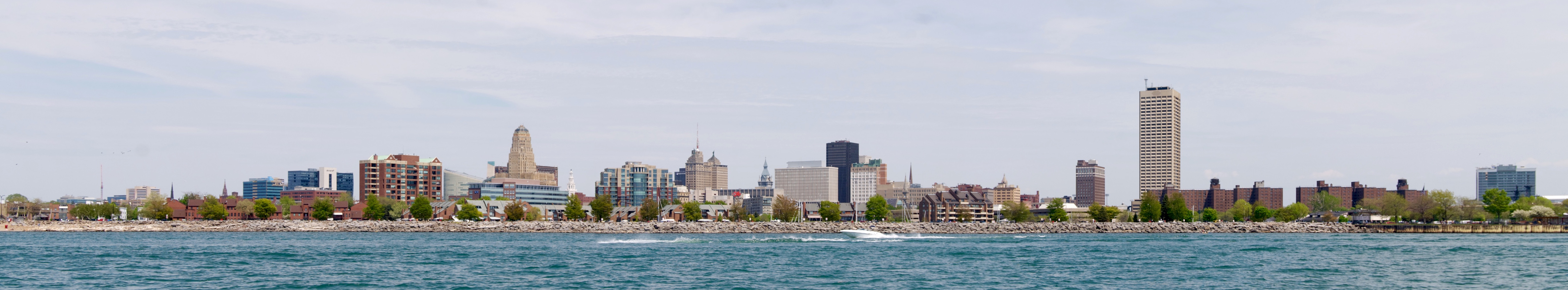
Skyline of Buffalo, looking east from Lake Erie

=== Neighborhoods ===
Historic Allentown District, Buffalo, New York

According to Mark Goldman, the city has a "tradition of separate and independent settlements". The boundaries of Buffalo's neighborhoods have changed over time. The city is divided into five districts, each containing several neighborhoods, for a total of thirty-five neighborhoods. Main Street divides Buffalo's east and west sides, and the west side was fully developed earlier. This division is seen in architectural styles, street names, neighborhood and district boundaries, demographics, and socioeconomic conditions; Buffalo's West Side is generally more affluent than its East Side.

Several neighborhoods in Buffalo have had increased investment since the 1990s, beginning with the Elmwood Village. The 2002 redevelopment of the Larkin Terminal Warehouse led to the creation of Larkinville, home to several mixed-use projects and anchored by corporate offices. Downtown Buffalo and its central business district (CBD) had a 10.6-percent increase in residents from 2010 to 2017, as over 1,061 housing units became available; the Seneca One Tower was redeveloped in 2020. Other revitalized areas include Chandler Street, in the Grant-Amherst neighborhood, and Hertel Avenue in Parkside.

The Buffalo Common Council adopted its Green Code in 2017, replacing zoning regulations which were over sixty years old. Its emphasis on regulations promoting pedestrian safety and mixed land use received an award at the 2019 Congress for the New Urbanism conference.

=== Climate ===
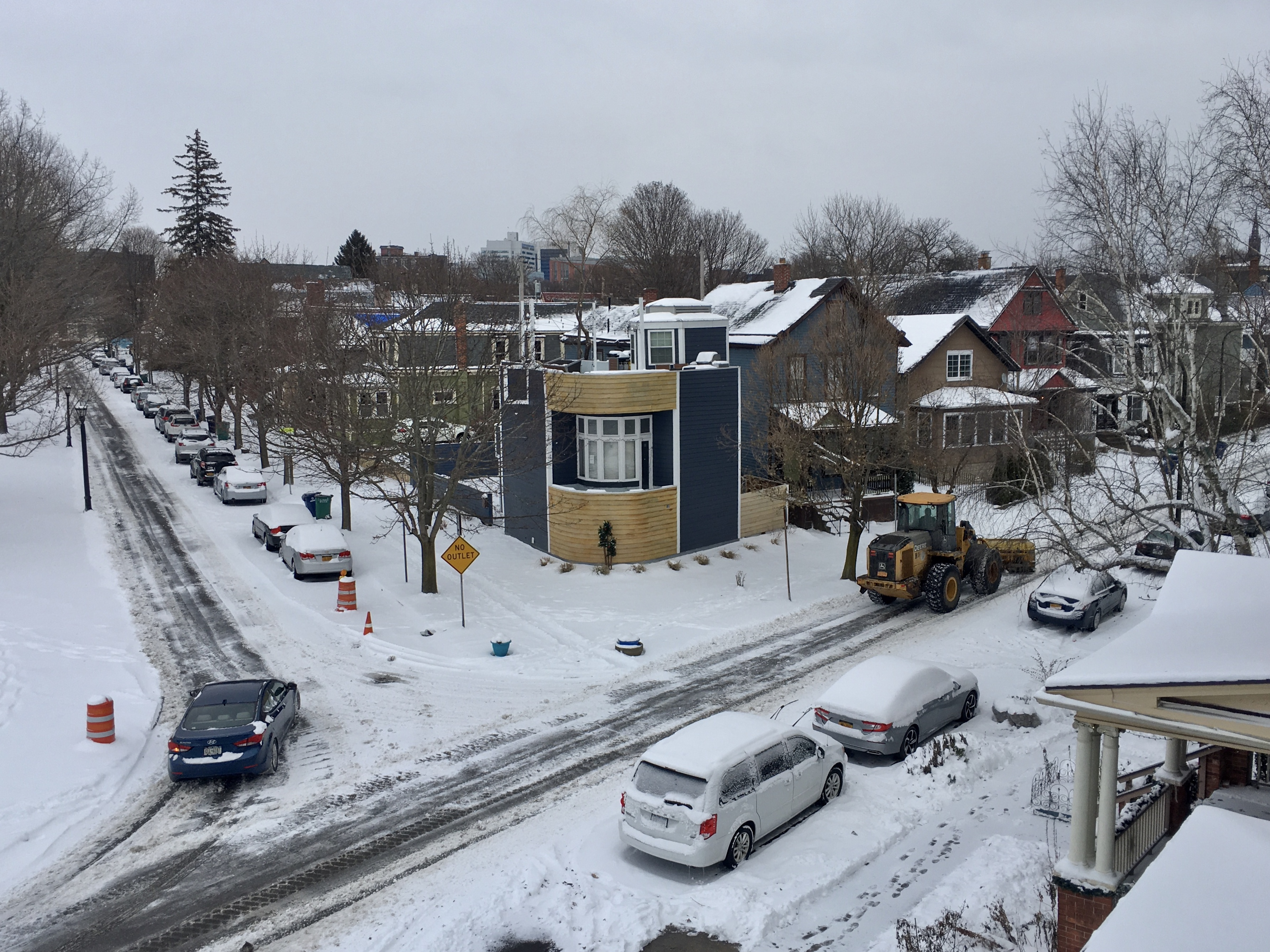
Buffalo in winter, 2019

Buffalo has a humid continental climate (Köppen: Dfa), and temperatures have been warming with the rest of the US. Lake-effect snow is characteristic of Buffalo winters, with snow bands (producing intense snowfall in the city and surrounding area) depending on wind direction off Lake Erie. However, Buffalo is rarely the snowiest city in the state. The Blizzard of 1977 resulted from a combination of high winds and snow which accumulated on land and on the frozen Lake Erie. Although snow does not typically impair the city's operation, it can cause significant damage in autumn (as the October 2006 storm did). In November 2014 (called "Snowvember"), the region had a record-breaking storm which produced over 5 1/2 ft (66 in; 170 cm) of snow. Buffalo's lowest recorded temperature was −20 °F (−29 °C), which occurred twice: on February 9, 1934, and February 2, 1961.

Although the city's summers are drier and sunnier than other cities in the northeastern United States, its vegetation receives enough precipitation to remain hydrated. Buffalo summers are characterized by abundant sunshine, with moderate humidity and temperatures; the city benefits from cool, southwestern Lake Erie summer breezes which temper warmer temperatures. Temperatures rise above 90 °F (32.2 °C) an average of three times a year. Buffalo is the only city with a population of over 100,000 in the contiguous United States that has not had an official recording of 100 °F (37.8 °C) or more to date, with a maximum temperature of 99 °F (37 °C) reached on August 27, 1948. Rainfall is moderate, typically falling at night, and cooler lake temperatures hinder storm development in July. August is usually rainier and muggier, as the warmer lake loses its temperature-controlling ability.

Climate data for Buffalo (Buffalo Niagara International Airport), 1991–2020 normals, (Note: Mean monthly maxima and minima (i.e. the expected highest and lowest temperature readings at any point during the year or given month) calculated based on data at said location from 1991 to 2020.) extremes 1871–present (Note: Official records for Buffalo kept January 1871 to June 1943 at downtown and at Buffalo Niagara Int'l since July 1943. For more information, see Threadex)
Month	Jan	Feb	Mar	Apr	May	Jun	Jul	Aug	Sep	Oct	Nov	Dec	Year
Record high °F (°C)	72 (22)	71 (22)	82 (28)	94 (34)	94 (34)	97 (36)	98 (37)	99 (37)	98 (37)	92 (33)	80 (27)	74 (23)	99 (37)
Mean maximum °F (°C)	56.4 (13.6)	54.5 (12.5)	66.0 (18.9)	77.9 (25.5)	84.3 (29.1)	88.1 (31.2)	89.5 (31.9)	88.5 (31.4)	86.4 (30.2)	77.9 (25.5)	67.4 (19.7)	56.8 (13.8)	91.5 (33.1)
Mean daily maximum °F (°C)	32.1 (0.1)	33.3 (0.7)	41.8 (5.4)	54.7 (12.6)	67.4 (19.7)	75.6 (24.2)	80.2 (26.8)	79.0 (26.1)	72.3 (22.4)	59.6 (15.3)	47.8 (8.8)	37.2 (2.9)	56.8 (13.8)
Daily mean °F (°C)	25.5 (−3.6)	26.4 (−3.1)	34.1 (1.2)	45.6 (7.6)	57.9 (14.4)	66.9 (19.4)	71.7 (22.1)	70.4 (21.3)	63.4 (17.4)	51.7 (10.9)	41.0 (5.0)	31.4 (−0.3)	48.8 (9.3)
Mean daily minimum °F (°C)	19.0 (−7.2)	19.5 (−6.9)	26.4 (−3.1)	36.5 (2.5)	48.3 (9.1)	58.1 (14.5)	63.1 (17.3)	61.7 (16.5)	54.5 (12.5)	43.9 (6.6)	34.2 (1.2)	25.6 (−3.6)	40.9 (4.9)
Mean minimum °F (°C)	0.8 (−17.3)	1.7 (−16.8)	9.3 (−12.6)	24.6 (−4.1)	35.6 (2.0)	45.6 (7.6)	52.8 (11.6)	51.0 (10.6)	41.0 (5.0)	30.7 (−0.7)	20.4 (−6.4)	8.5 (−13.1)	−2.8 (−19.3)
Record low °F (°C)	−16 (−27)	−20 (−29)	−7 (−22)	5 (−15)	25 (−4)	35 (2)	43 (6)	38 (3)	32 (0)	20 (−7)	2 (−17)	−10 (−23)	−20 (−29)
Average precipitation inches (mm)	3.35 (85)	2.49 (63)	2.89 (73)	3.37 (86)	3.37 (86)	3.37 (86)	3.23 (82)	3.23 (82)	4.10 (104)	4.03 (102)	3.50 (89)	3.75 (95)	40.68 (1,033)
Average snowfall inches (cm)	26.7 (68)	18.1 (46)	14.1 (36)	2.5 (6.4)	0.0 (0.0)	0.0 (0.0)	0.0 (0.0)	0.0 (0.0)	0.0 (0.0)	0.9 (2.3)	7.8 (20)	25.3 (64)	95.4 (242)
Average extreme snow depth inches (cm)	10.8 (27)	8.4 (21)	7.6 (19)	1.0 (2.5)	0.0 (0.0)	0.0 (0.0)	0.0 (0.0)	0.0 (0.0)	0.0 (0.0)	0.1 (0.25)	3.7 (9.4)	9.0 (23)	15.5 (39)
Average precipitation days (≥ 0.01 in)	19.2	15.8	14.8	13.4	12.8	11.9	10.8	10.0	10.9	14.1	14.4	17.7	165.8
Average snowy days (≥ 0.1 in)	16.4	13.5	9.1	3.2	0.0	0.0	0.0	0.0	0.0	0.4	4.7	12.2	59.5
Average relative humidity (%)	76.0	75.9	73.3	67.8	67.2	68.6	68.1	72.1	74.0	72.9	75.8	77.6	72.4
Average dew point °F (°C)	16.9 (−8.4)	17.6 (−8.0)	25.2 (−3.8)	33.4 (0.8)	44.2 (6.8)	54.1 (12.3)	59.0 (15.0)	58.8 (14.9)	52.5 (11.4)	41.7 (5.4)	32.7 (0.4)	22.6 (−5.2)	38.2 (3.5)
Mean monthly sunshine hours	91.3	108.0	163.7	204.7	258.3	287.1	306.7	266.4	207.6	159.4	84.4	69.0	2,206.6
Percentage possible sunshine	31	37	44	51	57	63	66	62	55	47	29	25	49
Average ultraviolet index	1	2	4	6	7	8	8	8	6	4	2	1	5
Source 1: NOAA (relative humidity and sun 1961–1990)
Source 2: Weather Atlas

== Demographics ==
Historical Racial composition	2020	2010	1990	1970	1940
White	41.9%	50.4%	64.7%	78.7%	96.8%
—Non-Hispanic	39.0%	45.8%	63.1%	n/a	n/a
African Americans	36.9%	38.6%	30.7%	20.4%	3.1%
Hispanic or Latino (of any race)	12.8%	10.5%	4.9%	1.6% (Note: From a 15-percent sample.)	n/a
Asian Americans	7.6%	3.2%	1.0%	0.2%	n/a
Other race	5.3%	3.1%	2.8%	0.2%	n/a

Historical population
Census	Pop.	Note	%±
1810	1,508		—
1820	2,095		38.9%
1830	8,668		313.7%
1840	18,213		110.1%
1850	42,261		132.0%
1860	81,129		92.0%
1870	117,714		45.1%
1880	155,134		31.8%
1890	255,664		64.8%
1900	352,387		37.8%
1910	423,715		20.2%
1920	506,775		19.6%
1930	573,076		13.1%
1940	575,901		0.5%
1950	580,132		0.7%
1960	532,759		−8.2%
1970	462,768		−13.1%
1980	357,870		−22.7%
1990	328,123		−8.3%
2000	292,648		−10.8%
2010	261,310		−10.7%
2020	278,349		6.5%
2025 (est.)	274,613	▼	−1.3%

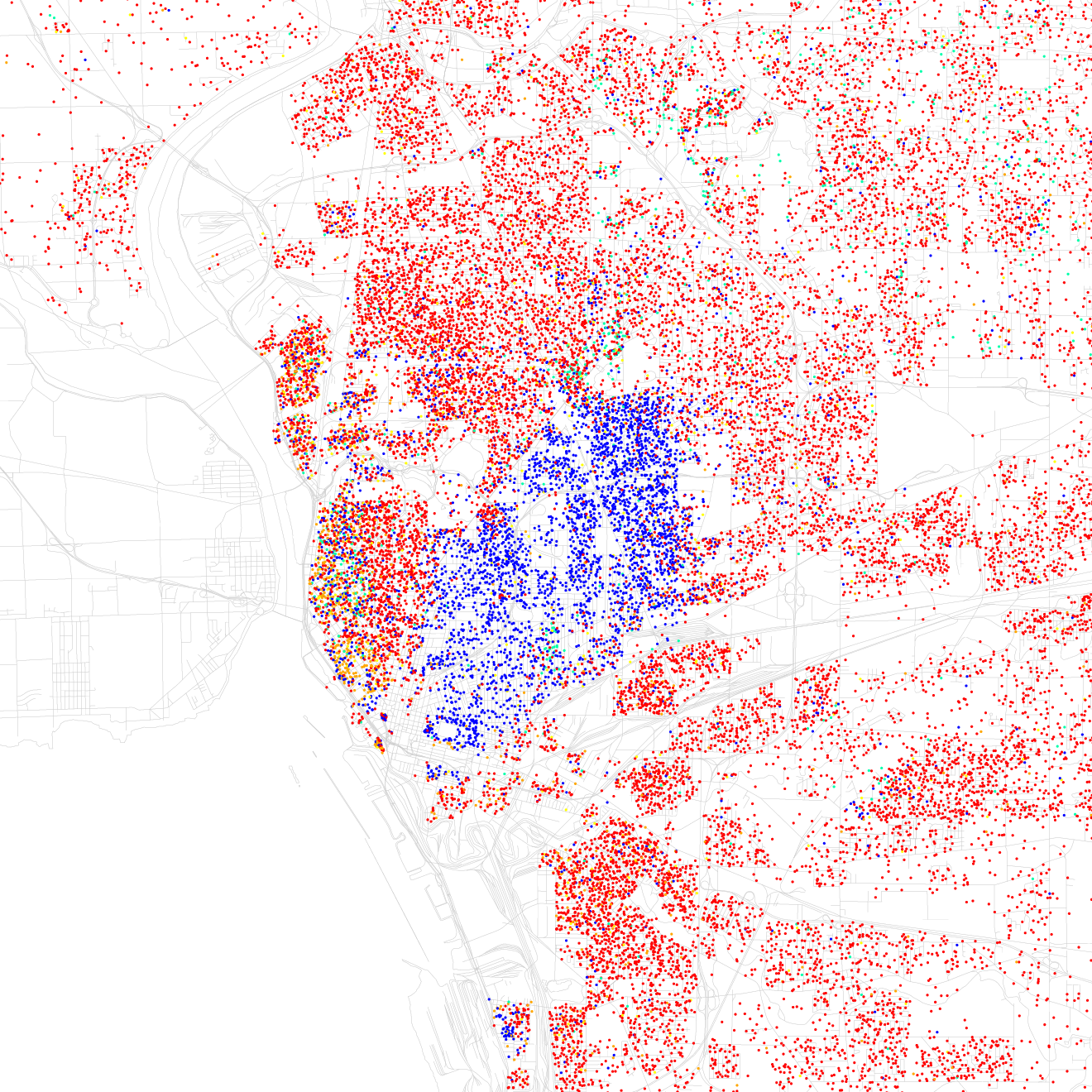
Racial distribution in Buffalo in 2010: Each dot represents 25 residents. ⬤ White ⬤ Black ⬤ Asian ⬤ Hispanic ⬤ Other

Several hundred Seneca, Tuscarora, and other Haudenosaunee people were the primary residents of the Buffalo area before 1800, concentrated along Buffalo Creek. After the Revolutionary War, settlers from New England and eastern New York began to move into the area.

From the 1830s to the 1850s, they were joined by Irish and German immigrants from Europe, both peasants and working class, who settled in enclaves on the city's south and east sides. At the turn of the 20th century, Polish immigrants replaced Germans on the East Side, who moved to newer housing; Italian immigrant families settled throughout the city, primarily on the lower West Side.

During the 1830s, Buffalo residents were generally intolerant of the small groups of Black Americans who began settling on the city's East Side. (Note: An exception before the mid-20th century was Jewish residents of the East Side during the 1920s, although they left the neighborhood through the 1960s (Goldman 1983b, p. 215).) In the 20th century, wartime and manufacturing jobs attracted Black Americans from the South during the First and Second Great Migrations. In the World War II and postwar years from 1940 to 1970, the city's Black population rose by 433 percent. They replaced most of the Polish community on the East Side, who were moving out to suburbs. However, the effects of redlining, steering, social inequality, blockbusting, white flight and other racial policies resulted in the city (and region) becoming one of the most segregated in the U.S.

During the 1940s and 1950s, Puerto Rican migrants arrived en masse, also seeking industrial jobs, settling on the East Side and moving westward. In the 21st century, Buffalo is classified as a majority minority city, with a plurality of residents who are Black and Latino.

Buffalo has experienced effects of urban decay since the 1970s, and also saw population loss to the suburbs and Sun Belt states, and experienced job losses from deindustrialization. The city's population peaked at 580,132 in 1950, when Buffalo was the 15th-largest city in the United States – down from the eighth-largest city in 1900, after its growth rate slowed during the 1920s. Buffalo finally saw a population gain of 6.5% in the 2020 census, reversing a decades long trend of population decline. The city has 278,349 residents as of the 2020 census, making it the 76th-most populous city in the United States. Its metropolitan area had 1.1 million residents in 2020, the country's 49th-largest.

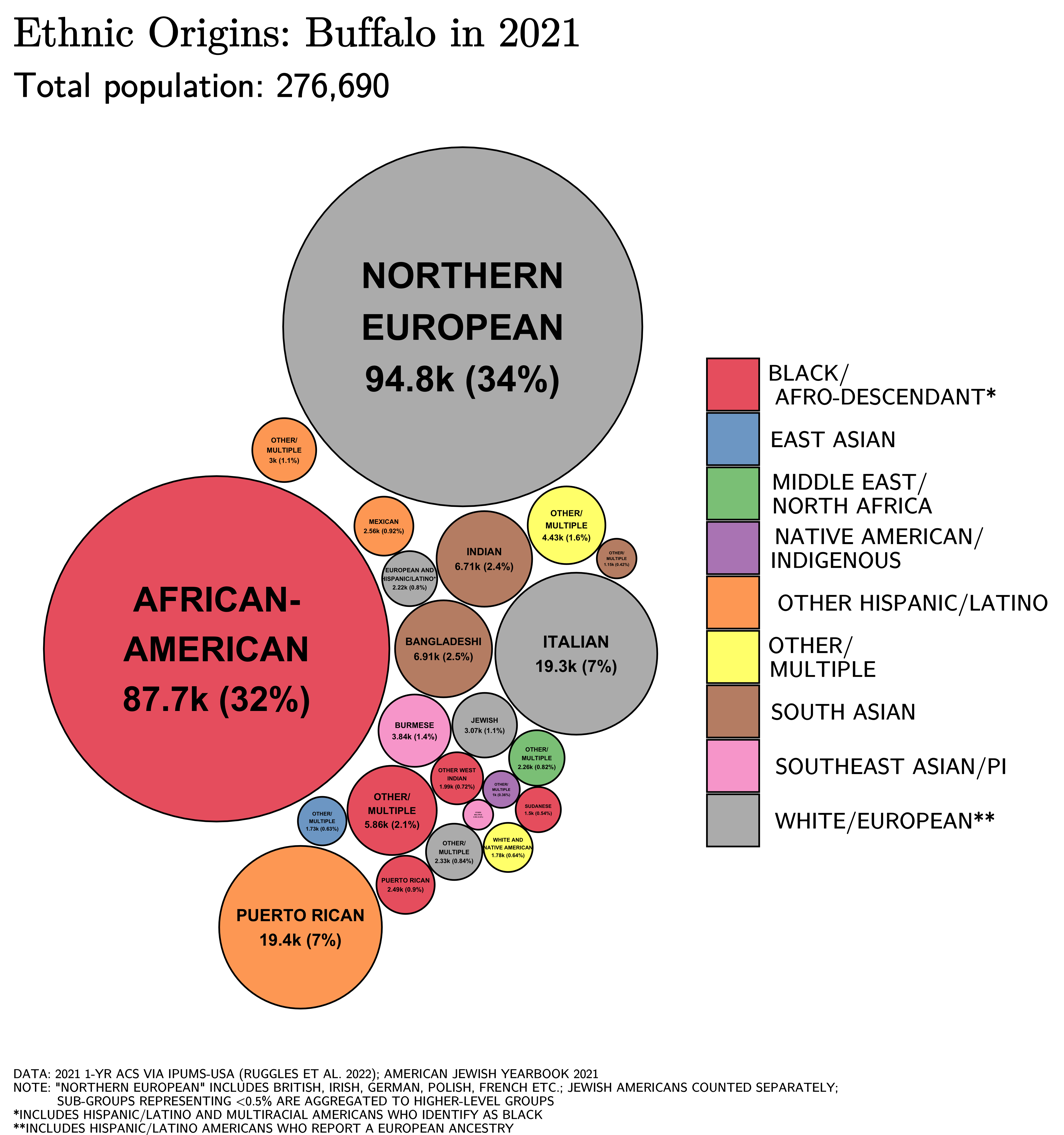
Ethnic origins in Buffalo

Compared to other major US metropolitan areas, the number of foreign-born immigrants to Buffalo is low. New immigrants are primarily resettled refugees (especially from war- or disaster-affected nations) and refugees who had previously settled in other U.S. cities. During the early 2000s, most immigrants came from Canada and Yemen; this shifted in the 2010s to Burmese (Karen) refugees and Bangladeshi immigrants. Between 2008 and 2016, Burmese, Somali, Bhutanese, and Iraqi Americans were the four largest ethnic immigrant groups in Erie County.

A 2008 report noted that although food deserts were seen in larger cities and not in Buffalo, the city's neighborhoods of color have access only to smaller grocery stores and lack the supermarkets more typical of newer, white neighborhoods. A 2018 report noted that over fifty city blocks on Buffalo's East Side lacked adequate access to a supermarket.

Health disparities exist compared to the rest of the state: Erie County's average 2019 lifespan was three years lower (78.4 years); its 17-percent smoking and 30-percent obesity rates were slightly higher than the state average. According to the Partnership for the Public Good, educational achievement in the city is lower than in the surrounding area; city residents are almost twice as likely as adults in the metropolitan area to lack a high-school diploma.

=== Religion ===
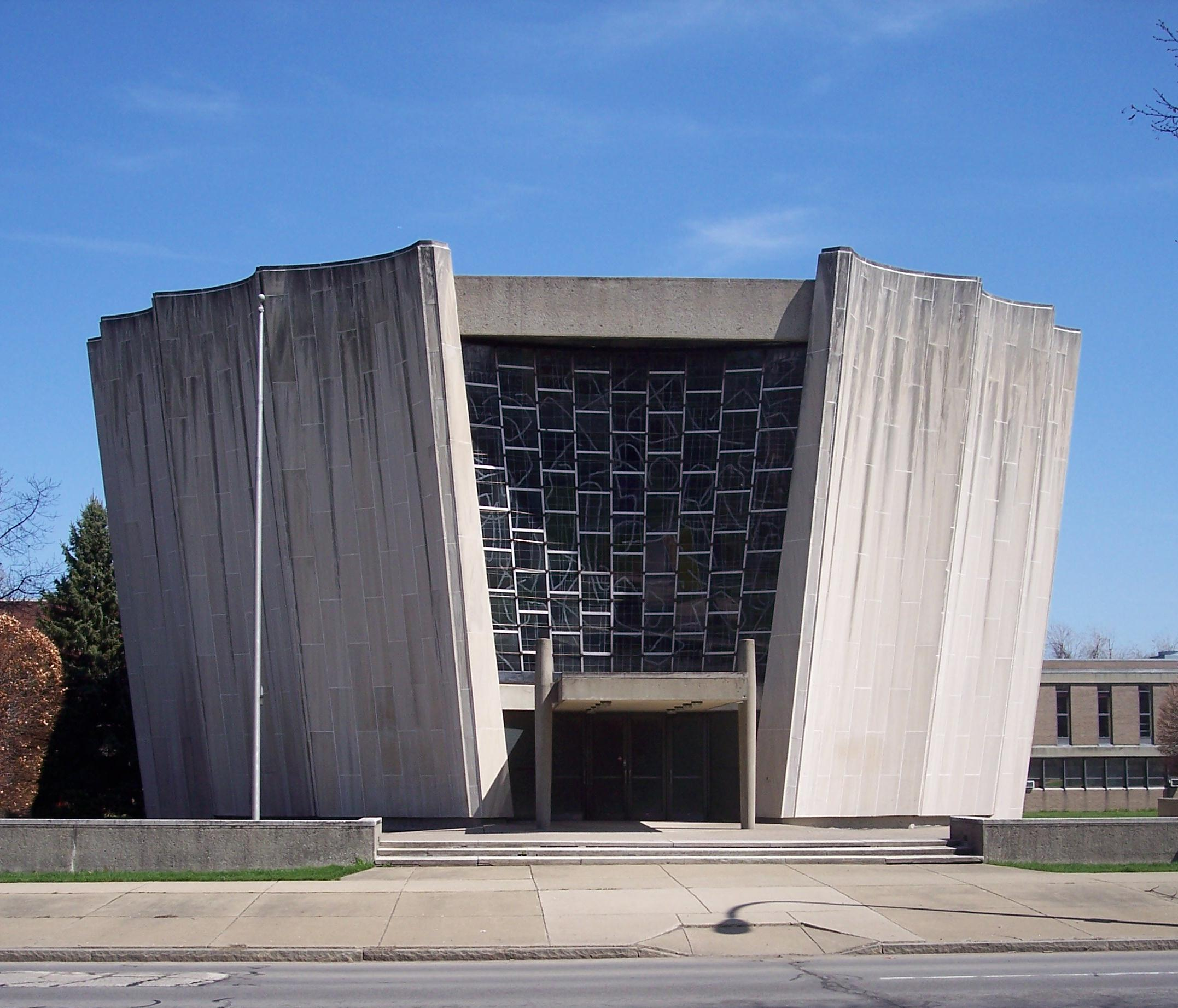
Temple Beth Zion

During the early 19th century, Presbyterian missionaries tried to convert the Seneca people on the Buffalo Creek Reservation to Christianity. Initially resistant, some tribal members set aside their traditions and practices to form their own sect. Later, European immigrants added other faiths. Christianity is the predominant religion in Buffalo and Western New York. Catholicism (primarily the Latin Church) has a significant presence in the region, with 161 parishes and over 570,000 adherents in the Diocese of Buffalo. Major Protestant denominations in the area include Lutheran, Baptist, and Methodist. Pentecostals are also significant, and approximately 20,000 persons are non-denominational adherents.

A Jewish community began developing in the city with immigrants from the mid-1800s; about one thousand German and Lithuanian Jews settled in Buffalo before 1880. Buffalo's first synagogue, Temple Beth El, was established in 1847. The city's Temple Beth Zion is the region's largest synagogue.

With changing demographics and an increased number of refugees from other areas on the city's East Side, Islam and Buddhism have expanded their presence. In this area, new residents have converted empty churches into mosques and Buddhist temples. Hinduism maintains a small, active presence in the area, including the town of Amherst.

A 2016 American Bible Society survey reported that Buffalo is the fifth-least "Bible-minded" city in the United States; 13 percent of its residents associate with the Bible.

== Economy ==
Top private-sector Buffalo area employers, 2020 Source: Invest Buffalo Niagara
Rank	Employer	Employees
1	Kaleida Health	8,359
2	Catholic Health	7,623
3	M&T Bank	7,400
4	Tops Friendly Markets	5,374
5	Seneca Gaming Corp.	3,402
6	Roswell Park Cancer Institute	3,328
7	GEICO	3,250
8	Wegmans	3,102
9	HSBC Bank USA	3,000
10	General Motors	2,981

The Erie Canal was the impetus for Buffalo's economic growth as a transshipment hub for grain and other agricultural products headed east from the Midwest. Later, manufacturing of steel and automotive parts became central to the city's economy. When these industries downsized in the region, Buffalo's economy became service-based. Its primary sectors include health care, business services (banking, accounting, and insurance), retail, tourism and logistics, especially with Canada. Despite the loss of large-scale manufacturing, some manufacturing of metals, chemicals, machinery, food products, and electronics remains in the region. Advanced manufacturing has increased, with an emphasis on research and development (R&D) and automation. In 2019, the U.S. Bureau of Economic Analysis valued the gross domestic product (GDP) of the Buffalo–Niagara Falls MSA at $53 billion (~$65.7 billion in 2025).

The civic sector is a major source of employment in the Buffalo area, and includes public, non-profit, healthcare and educational institutions. New York State, with over 19,000 employees, is the region's largest employer. In the private sector, top employers include the Kaleida Health and Catholic Health hospital networks and M&T Bank, the sole Fortune 500 company headquartered in the city. Most have been the top employers in the region for several decades. Buffalo is home to the headquarters of Rich Products, Delaware North and New Era Cap Company; the aerospace manufacturer Moog Inc. and toy maker Fisher-Price are based in nearby East Aurora. National Fuel Gas and Life Storage are headquartered in Williamsville, New York.

Buffalo weathered the Great Recession of 2006–09 well in comparison with other U.S. cities, exemplified by increased home prices during this time. The region's economy began to improve in the early 2010s, adding over 25,000 jobs from 2009 to 2017. With state aid, Tesla, Inc.'s Giga New York plant opened in South Buffalo in 2017. The effects of the COVID-19 pandemic in the United States, however, increased the local unemployment rate to 7.5 percent by December 2020. The local unemployment rate had been 4.2 percent in 2019, higher than the national average of 3.5 percent.

== Culture ==
=== Performing arts and music ===
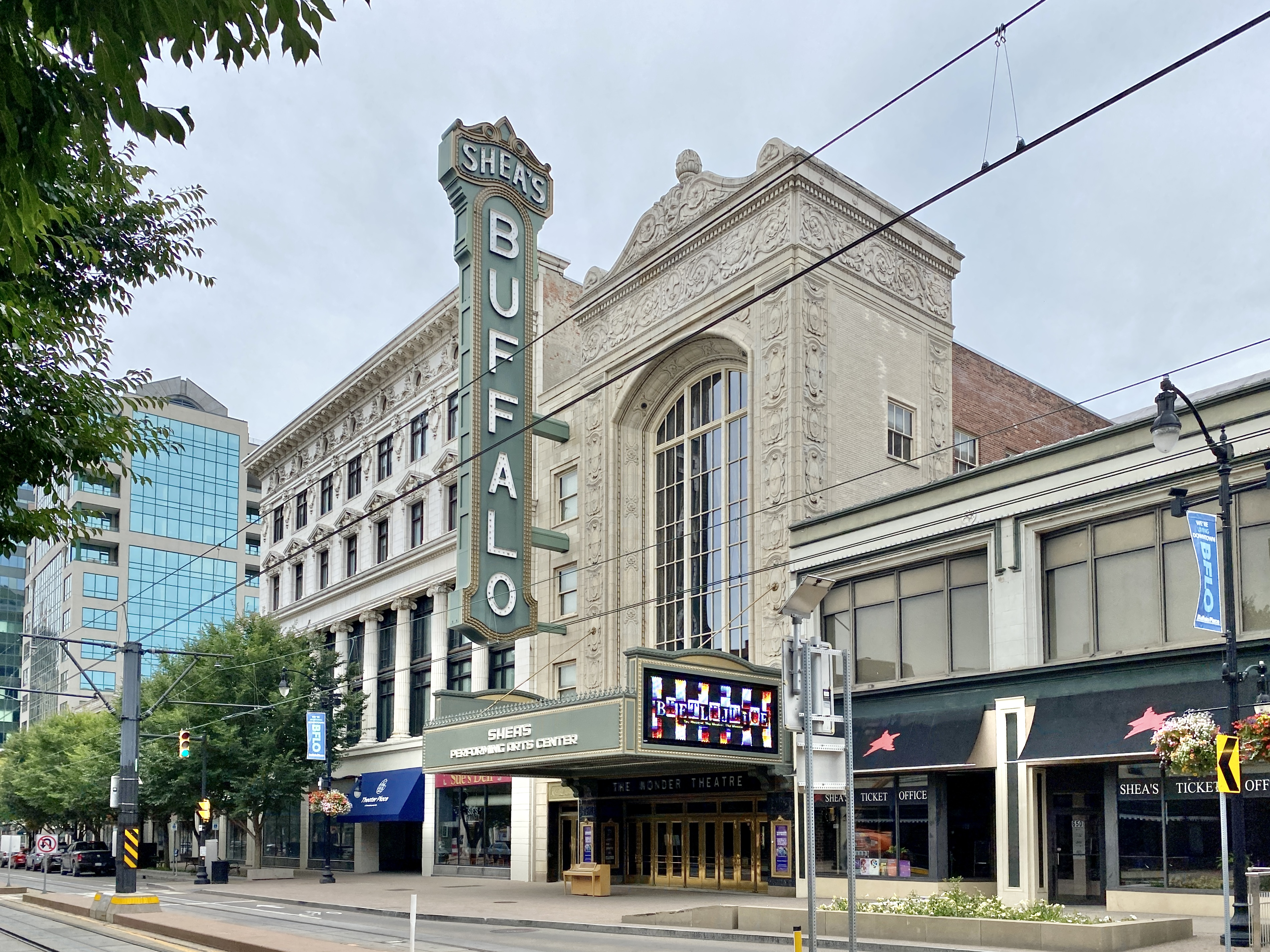
Shea's Performing Arts Center

Buffalo is home to over 20 theater companies, with many centered in the downtown Theatre District. Shea's Performing Arts Center is the city's largest theater. Designed by Louis Comfort Tiffany and built in 1926, the theater presents Broadway musicals and concerts. Shakespeare in Delaware Park has been held outdoors every summer since 1976.

Comedy can be found throughout the city and is anchored by Helium Comedy Club, which hosts both local talent and national touring acts.

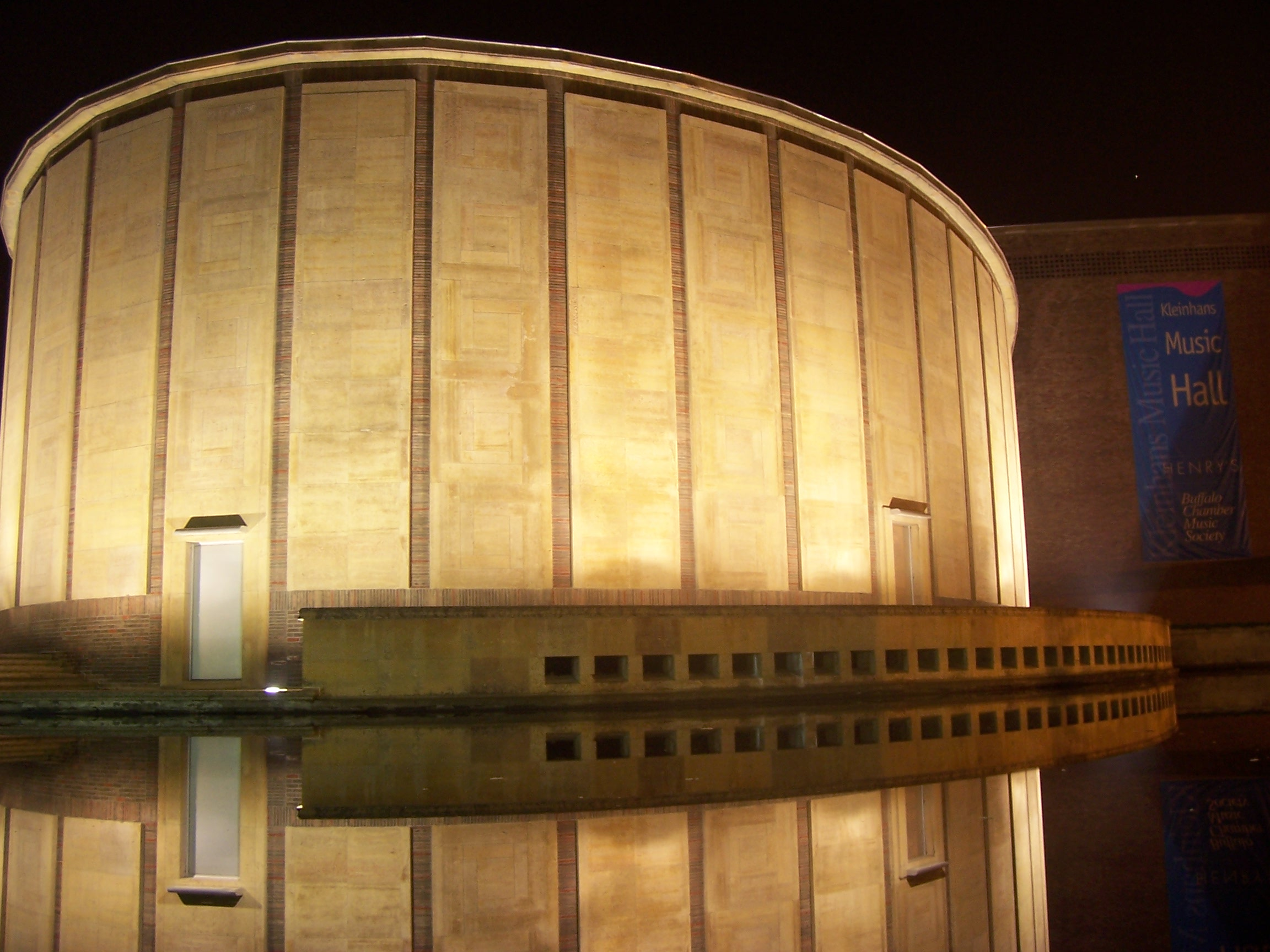
Kleinhans Music Hall

The Buffalo Philharmonic Orchestra was formed in 1935 and performs at Kleinhans Music Hall, whose acoustics have been praised. Although the orchestra nearly disbanded during the late 1990s due to a lack of funding, philanthropic contributions and state aid stabilized it. Under the direction of JoAnn Falletta, the orchestra has received a number of Grammy Award nominations and won the Grammy Award for Best Contemporary Classical Composition in 2009.

KeyBank Center draws national music acts year-round. Sahlen Field hosts the annual WYRK Taste of Country music festival every summer with national country music acts. Canalside regularly hosts outdoor summer concerts, a tradition that spun off from the defunct Thursday at the Square concert series. Colored Musicians Club, an extension of what was a separate musicians'-union chapter, maintains jazz history.

Rick James was born and raised in Buffalo and later lived on a ranch in the nearby Town of Aurora. James formed his Stone City Band in Buffalo, and had national appeal with several crossover singles in the R&B, disco and funk genres in the late 1970s and early 1980s. Around the same time, the jazz fusion band Spyro Gyra and jazz saxophonist Grover Washington Jr. also got their start in the city.

The Goo Goo Dolls, an alternative rock group which formed in 1986, had 19 top-ten singles. Singer-songwriter and activist Ani DiFranco has released over 20 folk and indie rock albums on Righteous Babe Records, her Buffalo-based label. The death metal band Cannibal Corpse is the most commercially successful in the genre; they later settled in Tampa, Florida.

Underground hip-hop acts in the city partner with Buffalo-based Griselda Records, whose artists include Westside Gunn, Conway the Machine, and Benny the Butcher, who all occasionally refer to Buffalo culture in their lyrics.

=== Cuisine ===
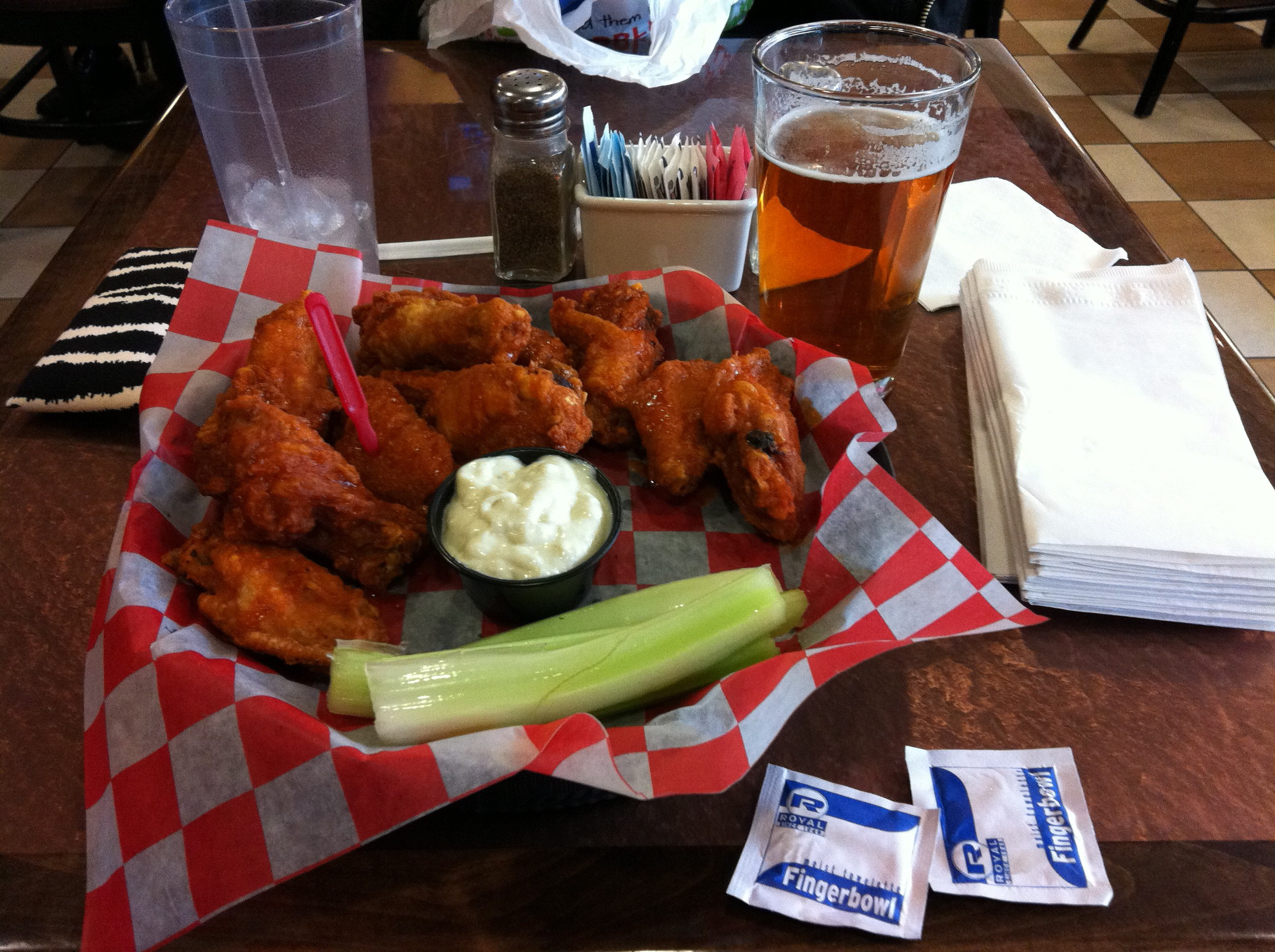
Buffalo wings with celery and blue cheese

The city's cuisine encompasses a variety of cultures and ethnicities. In 2015, the National Geographic Society ranked Buffalo third on its "World's Top Ten Food Cities" list. Teressa Bellissimo first prepared Buffalo wings (seasoned chicken wings) at the Anchor Bar in 1964. The Anchor Bar has a crosstown rivalry with Duff's Famous Wings, but Buffalo wings are served at many bars and restaurants throughout the city (some with unique cooking styles and flavor profiles). Buffalo wings are traditionally served with blue cheese dressing and celery. In 2003, the Anchor Bar received a James Beard Foundation Award in the America's Classics category.

The Buffalo area has over 600 pizzerias, estimated at more per capita than New York City, and is known for Buffalo-style pizza. Several craft breweries began opening in the 1990s, and the city's last call is 4 am. Other mainstays of Buffalo cuisine include beef on weck, butter lambs, kielbasa, pierogi, sponge candy, chicken finger subs (including the stinger – a version that also includes steak), and the fish fry (popular any time of year, but especially during Lent). With an influx of refugees and other immigrants to Buffalo, its number of ethnic restaurants (including the West Side Bazaar kitchen incubator) has increased. Some restaurants use food trucks to serve customers, and nearly fifty food trucks appeared at Larkin Square in 2019.

=== Museums and tourism ===
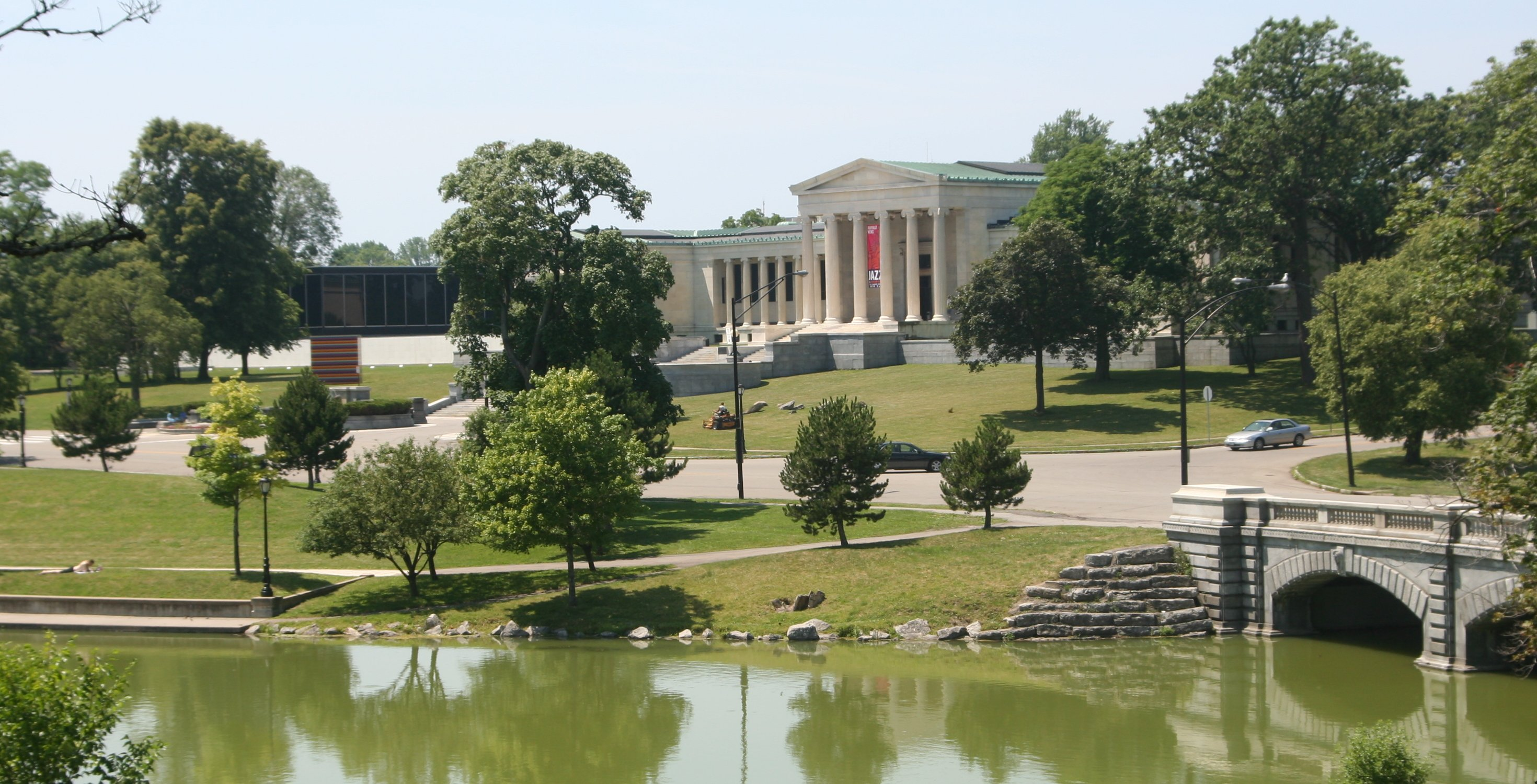
The Albright–Knox Art Gallery, seen from Hoyt Lake in Delaware Park

Buffalo was ranked the seventh-best city in the United States to visit in 2021 by Travel + Leisure, which noted the growth and potential of the city's cultural institutions. The Buffalo AKG Art Museum (formerly known as the Albright-Knox Art Gallery) is a modern and contemporary art museum with a collection of more than 8,000 works, of which only two percent are on display. With a donation from Jeffrey Gundlach, a three-story addition designed by the Dutch architectural firm OMA opened June 2023 . Across the street, the Burchfield Penney Art Center contains paintings by Charles E. Burchfield and is operated by Buffalo State College. Buffalo is home to the Freedom Wall, a 2017 art installation commemorating civil-rights activists throughout history. Near both museums is the Buffalo History Museum, featuring artwork, literature and exhibits related to the city's history and major events, and the Buffalo Museum of Science is on the city's East Side.

Canalside, Buffalo's historic business district and harbor, attracts more than 1.5 million visitors annually. It includes the Explore & More Children's Museum, the Buffalo and Erie County Naval & Military Park, LECOM Harborcenter, and a number of shops and restaurants. A restored 1924 carousel (now solar-powered) and a replica boathouse were added to Canalside in 2021. Other city attractions include the Theodore Roosevelt Inaugural National Historic Site, the Michigan Street Baptist Church, Buffalo RiverWorks, Seneca Buffalo Creek Casino, Buffalo Transportation Pierce-Arrow Museum, and the Nash House Museum.

The National Buffalo Wing Festival is held every Labor Day at Sahlen Field. Since 2002, it has served over 4.8 million Buffalo wings and has had a total attendance of 865,000. The Taste of Buffalo is a two-day food festival held in July at Niagara Square, attracting 450,000 visitors annually. Other events include the Allentown Art Festival, the Polish-American Dyngus Day, the Elmwood Avenue Festival of the Arts, Juneteenth in Martin Luther King Jr. Park, the World's Largest Disco in October and Friendship Festival in summer, which celebrates Canada-US relations.

== Sports ==
Professional sports teams in Buffalo
Team	Sport	League	Founded	Venue (capacity)	Championships
Buffalo Bills	American football	NFL	1959	Highmark Stadium (60,108)	1964 and 1965 (Note: The Buffalo Bills' championships in 1964 and 1965 were with the American Football League, prior to the AFL-NFL Merger)
Buffalo Bisons	Baseball	IL	1979	Sahlen Field (16,600)	1997, 1998, 2004
Buffalo Sabres	Ice hockey	NHL	1970	KeyBank Center (19,070)	
Buffalo Bandits	Lacrosse	NLL	1992	KeyBank Center (19,070)	1992, 1993, 1996, 2008, 2023, 2024, 2025
Buffalo Pro Soccer	Soccer	USLC	2024	TBD	

Buffalo has three major professional sports teams: the Buffalo Sabres (National Hockey League), the Buffalo Bills (National Football League), and the Buffalo Bandits (National Lacrosse League). The Bills were a founding member of the American Football League in 1960, and have played at Highmark Stadium in Orchard Park since 2026 which replaced the adjacent Ralph Wilson Stadium. They have played in Orchard Park since moving from War Memorial Stadium in 1973. They are the only NFL team based in New York State. (Note: The New York Jets and the New York Giants play at MetLife Stadium in East Rutherford, New Jersey.) Before the Super Bowl era, the Bills won the American Football League Championship in 1964 and 1965. With mixed success throughout their history, the Bills had a close loss in Super Bowl XXV and returned to consecutive Super Bowls after the 1991, 1992, and 1993 seasons (losing each time). The Sabres, an expansion team in 1970, share KeyBank Center with the Bandits. The Bandits are the most decorated of the city's professional teams, with seven championships. The Bills, Sabres and Bandits are owned by Pegula Sports and Entertainment.

Buffalo's minor-league professional teams include the Buffalo Bisons (International League), who play at Sahlen Field, and Buffalo Pro Soccer (USL Championship). Semi-professional teams include the Buffalo eXtreme (American Basketball Association), FC Buffalo (USL League Two), FC Buffalo Women (USL W League), and Buffalo Stallions (National Premier Soccer League).

Several colleges and universities in the area field intercollegiate sports teams; the Buffalo Bulls and the Canisius Golden Griffins compete in NCAA Division I. The Bulls have 16 varsity sports in the Mid-American Conference (MAC); the Golden Griffins field 15 teams in the Metro Atlantic Athletic Conference (MAAC), with the men's hockey team part of the Atlantic Hockey Association (AHA). The Bulls participate in the Football Bowl Subdivision, the highest level of college football.

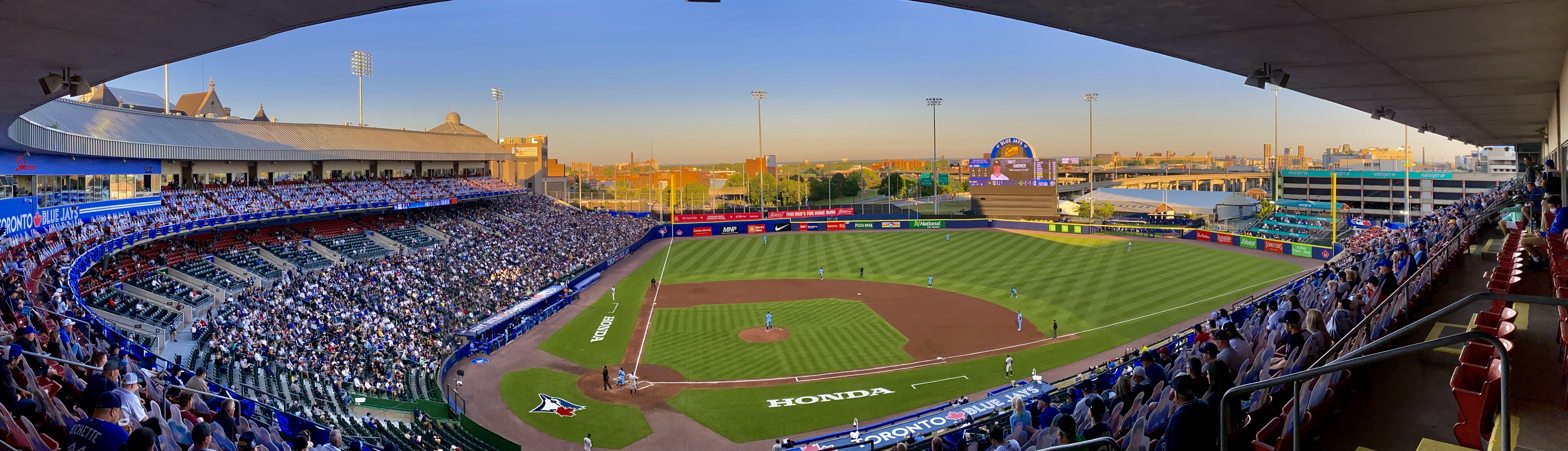
Sahlen Field, home of the Buffalo Bisons since 1988

== Parks and recreation ==
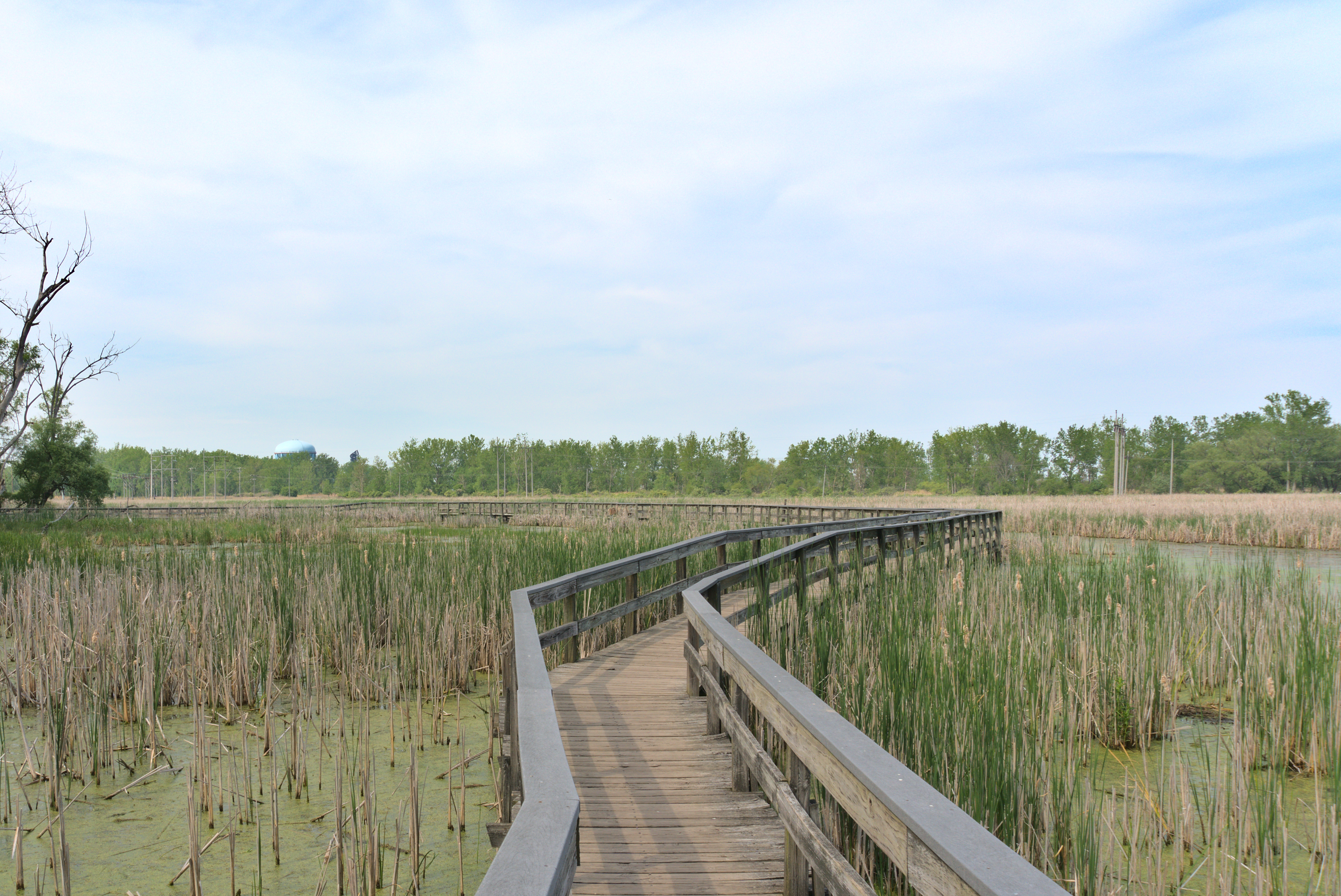
Tifft Nature Preserve

Frederick Law Olmsted described Buffalo as being "the best planned city [...] in the United States, if not the world". With encouragement from city stakeholders, he and Calvert Vaux augmented the city's grid plan by drawing inspiration from Paris and introducing landscape architecture with aspects of the countryside. Their plan would introduce a system of interconnected parks, parkways and trails, unlike the singular Central Park in New York City. The largest would be Delaware Park, across Forest Lawn Cemetery to amplify the amount of open space. With construction of the system finishing in 1876, it is regarded as the country's oldest; however, some of Olmsted's plans were never fully realized. Some parks later diminished and succumbed to diseases, highway construction, and weather events such as Lake Storm Aphid in 2006. The non-profit Buffalo Olmsted Park Conservancy was created in 2004 to help preserve the 850 acres (340 ha) of parkland. Olmsted's work in Buffalo inspired similar efforts in cities such as San Francisco, Chicago, and Boston.

The city's Division of Parks and Recreation manages over 180 parks and facilities, seven recreational centers, twenty-one pools and splash pads, and three ice rinks. The 350-acre (140 ha) Delaware Park features the Buffalo Zoo, Hoyt Lake, a golf course, and playing fields. Buffalo collaborated with its sister city Kanazawa to create the park's Japanese Garden in 1970, where cherry blossoms bloom in the spring. Opening in 1976, Tifft Nature Preserve in South Buffalo is on 264 acres (107 ha) of remediated industrial land. The preserve is an Important Bird Area, including a meadow with trails for hiking and cross-country skiing, marshland and fishing. The Olmsted-designed Cazenovia and South Parks, the latter home to the Buffalo and Erie County Botanical Gardens, are also in South Buffalo. According to the Trust for Public Land, Buffalo's 2022 ParkScore ranking had high marks for access to parks, with 89 percent of city residents living within a ten-minute walk from a park. The city ranked lower in acreage, however; nine percent of city land is devoted to parks, compared with the national median of about fifteen percent.

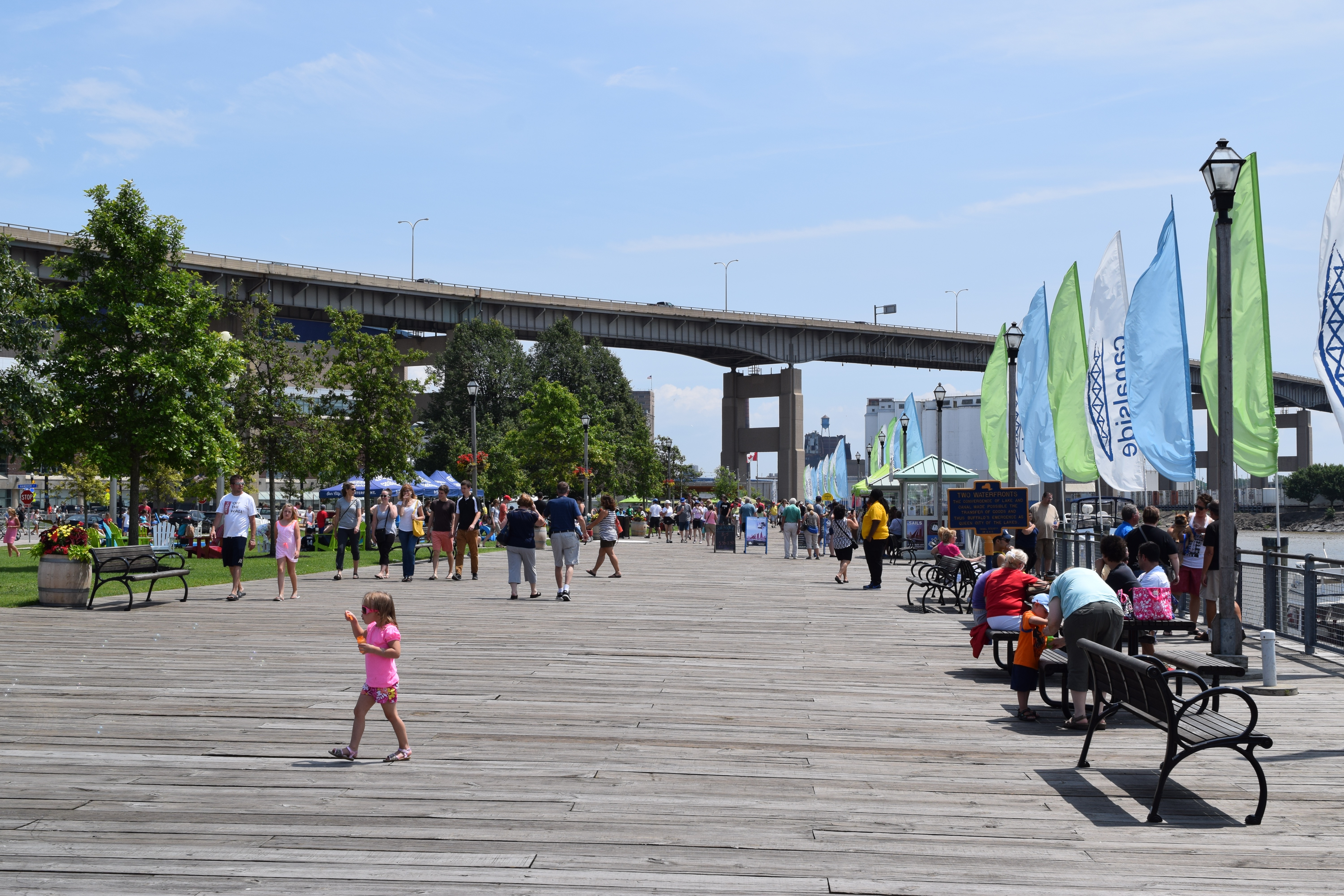
Looking down Canalside's Central Wharf

Efforts to convert Buffalo's former industrial waterfront into recreational space have attracted national attention, with some writers comparing its appeal to that of Niagara Falls. Redevelopment of the waterfront began in the early 2000s, with the reconstruction of historically aligned canals on the site of the former Buffalo Memorial Auditorium. Placemaking initiatives would lead to the area's popularity, rather than permanent buildings and attractions. Under Mayor Byron Brown, Canalside was cited by the Brookings Institution as an example of waterfront revitalization for other U.S. cities to follow. Summer events have included paddle-boating and fitness classes, and the frozen canals permit ice skating, curling, and ice cycling in winter. Its success spurred the state to create Buffalo Harbor State Park in 2014; the park has trails, open recreation areas, bicycle paths and piers. The park's Gallagher Beach, the city's only public beach, has prohibited swimming due to high bacteria levels and other environmental concerns.

The Shoreline Trail passes through Buffalo near the Outer Harbor, Centennial Park, and the Black Rock Canal. The North Buffalo–Tonawanda rail trail begins in Shoshone Park, near the LaSalle metro station in North Buffalo.

== Government ==
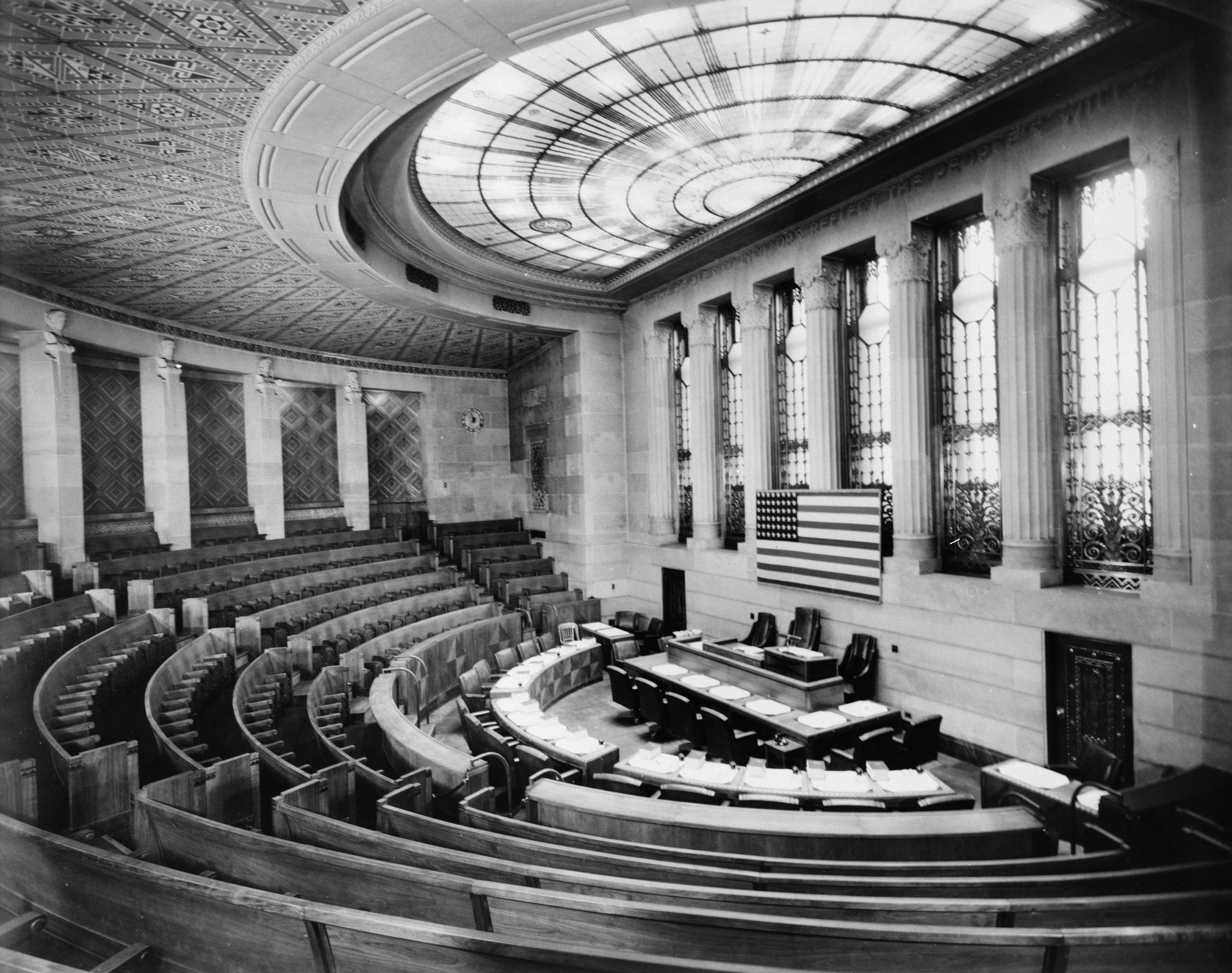
Common Council Chamber, Buffalo City Hall

Buffalo has a Strong mayor–council government. As the chief executive of city government, the mayor oversees the heads of the city's departments, participates in ceremonies, boards and commissions, and is as the liaison between the city and local cultural institutions. Some agencies, including utilities, urban renewal and public housing, are state- and federally-funded public benefit-corporations semi-independent of city government. Sean Ryan has served as mayor since January 1, 2026. No Republican has been mayor of Buffalo since Chester A. Kowal in 1965.

With its nine districts, the Buffalo Common Council enacts laws, levies taxes, and approves mayoral appointees and the city budget. Bryan J. Bollman has been the Common Council president since 2024. Generally reflecting the city's electorate, all nine councilmen are members of the Democratic Party. Buffalo is the Erie County seat, and is within five of the county's eleven legislative districts.

The city is part of the Eighth Judicial District. Court cases handled at the city level include misdemeanors, violations, housing matters, and claims under $15,000; more severe cases are handled at the county level. Buffalo is represented by members of the New York State Assembly and New York State Senate. At the federal level, the city takes up most of New York's 26th congressional district and has been represented by Democrat Tim Kennedy since 2024.

Federal offices in the city include the Buffalo District of the United States Army Corps of Engineers' Great Lakes and Ohio River Division, the Federal Bureau of Investigation, and the United States District Court for the Western District of New York.

In 2020, the city spent $519 million (~$635 million in 2025) on the effects of the COVID-19 pandemic. The city in 2024 is hampered with a severe budget deficit attributed to the Byron Brown administration.

=== Public safety ===
Buffalo, New York
- Crime rates* (2019)

Violent crimes
- Homicide: 47
- Rape: 121
- Robbery: 802
- Aggravated assault: 1,563
- Total violent crime: 2,533 ▼

Property crimes
- Burglary: 1,609
- Larceny-theft: 6,008
- Motor vehicle theft: 678
- Total property crime: 8,295 ▼
- Note: Reported crimes per 100,000 population Source: Buffalo City Police Department

Buffalo is served by the Buffalo Police Department. The police commissioner is Byron Lockwood, who was appointed by Mayor Byron Brown in 2018. Although some criminal activity in the city remains higher than the national average, total crimes have decreased since the 1990s; one reason may be the gun buyback program implemented by the Brown administration in the mid-2000s. Before this, the city was part of the nationwide crack epidemic of the 1980s and 1990s and its accompanying record-high crime levels. In 2018, city police began wearing 300 body cameras. A 2021 Partnership for the Public Good report noted that the BPD, which had a 2020–21 budget of about $145.7 million, had an above-average police-to-citizen ratio of 28.9 officers per 10,000 residents in 2020 – higher than peer cities Minneapolis and Toledo, Ohio. The force had a roster of 740 officers during the year, about two-thirds of whom handled emergency requests, road patrol and other non-office assignments. The department has been criticized for misconduct and brutality, including the 2004 wrongful termination of officer Cariol Horne for opposing police brutality toward a suspect and a 2020 protest-shoving incident.

The Buffalo Fire Department and American Medical Response (AMR) handle fire-protection and emergency medical services (EMS) calls in the city. The fire department has about 710 firefighters and thirty-five stations, including twenty-three engine companies and twelve ladder companies. The department also operates the Edward M. Cotter, considered the world's oldest active fireboat.

With vacant and abandoned homes prone to arson, squatting, prostitution and other criminal activities, the fire and police department's resources were overburdened before the 2010s. Buffalo ranked second nationwide to St. Louis for vacant homes per capita in 2007, and the city began a five-year program to demolish five thousand vacant, damaged and abandoned homes. On May 14, 2022, there was a mass shooting in a Tops supermarket on the East Side of Buffalo where 13 victims were shot in a racially motivated attack by a white supremacist who drove there from Conklin, over 200 miles away. Ten victims, all of whom were black, were murdered and three were injured.

== Media ==
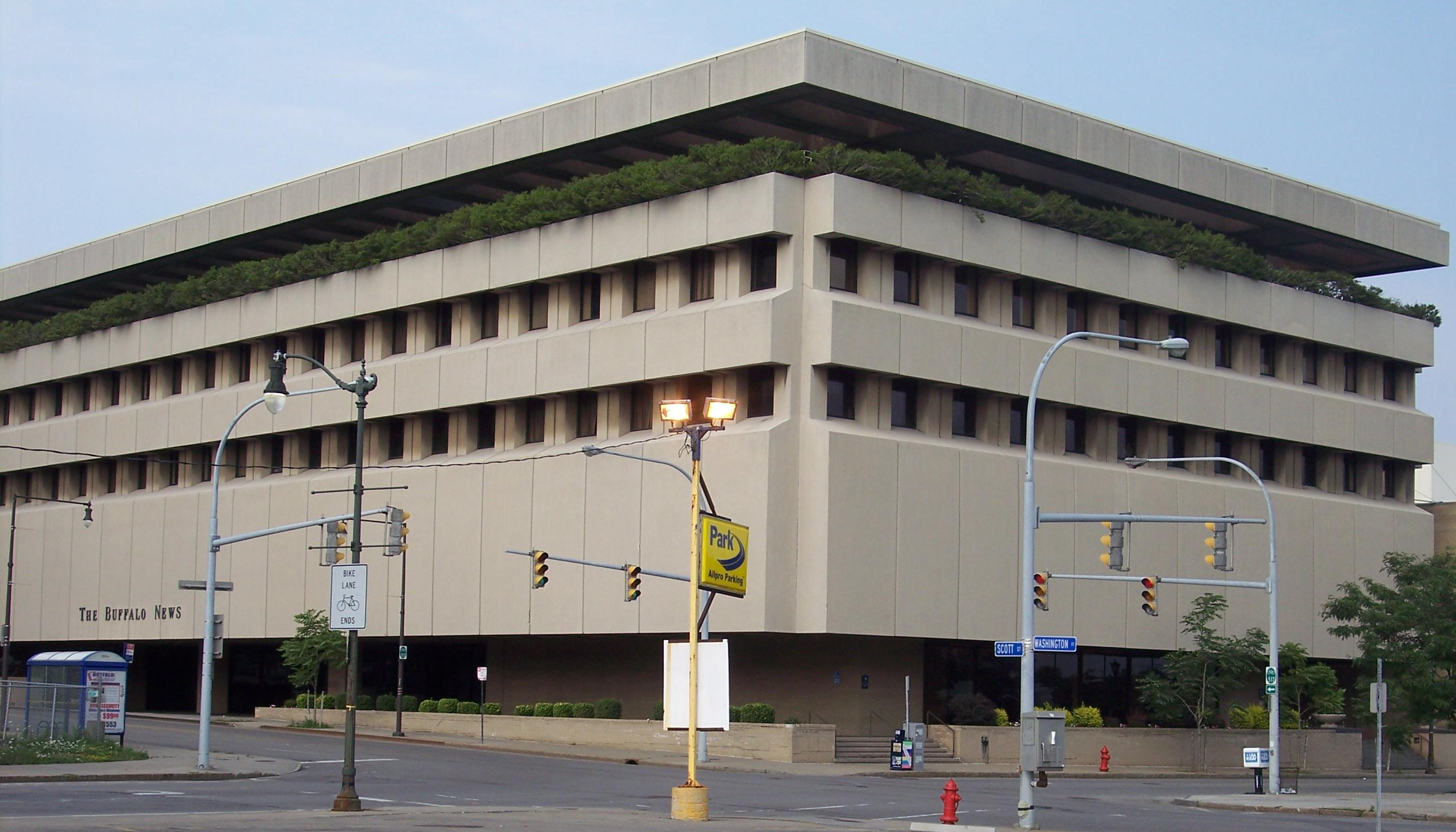
The Buffalo News headquarters

Buffalo's major daily newspaper is The Buffalo News. Established in 1880 as the Buffalo Evening News, the newspaper is estimated to have a daily circulation of 35,000 (down from a high of 310,000). The newspaper announced a pending sale of its building in February 2023, and the relocation of its printing operations to Cleveland, Ohio. Other newspapers in the Buffalo area include the Black-focused Buffalo Criterion and Challenger Community News, The Record of Buffalo State University, The Spectrum of the University at Buffalo, and Buffalo Business First. Investigative Post is an online watchdog news organization founded by former Buffalo News reporter and Pulitzer nominee Jim Heaney.

Eighteen radio stations are licensed in Buffalo, including an FM station at Buffalo State College. Over ninety FM and AM radio signals can be received throughout the city. Eight full-power television outlets serve the city. Major commercial stations include WGRZ 2 (NBC), WIVB-TV 4 (CBS) and its sister station WNLO 23 (CW O&O), WKBW-TV 7 (ABC), and WUTV 29 (Fox, received in parts of Southern Ontario) and its sister station WNYO-TV 49 (MyNetworkTV). Buffalo's public television station is WNED-TV 17 (PBS); WNED has reported that most of the station's members live in the Greater Toronto Area. According to Nielsen Media Research, the Buffalo television market was the 51st largest in the United States as of 2020.

Movies shooting significant footage in Buffalo include Hide in Plain Sight (1980), Tuck Everlasting (1981), Best Friends (1982), The Natural (1984), Vamping (1984), Canadian Bacon (1995), Buffalo '66 (1998), Manna from Heaven (2002), Bruce Almighty (2003), The Savages (2007), Slime City Massacre (2010), Henry's Crime (2011), Sharknado 2: The Second One (2014), Killer Rack (2015), Teenage Mutant Ninja Turtles: Out of the Shadows (2016), Marshall (2016), The American Side (2017), The First Purge (2018), The True Adventures of Wolfboy (2019) and A Quiet Place Part II (2021). Although higher Buffalo production costs led to some films being finished elsewhere, tax credits and other economic incentives have enabled new film studios and production facilities to open. In 2021, several studio projects were in the planning stages.

== Education ==
=== Primary and secondary education ===
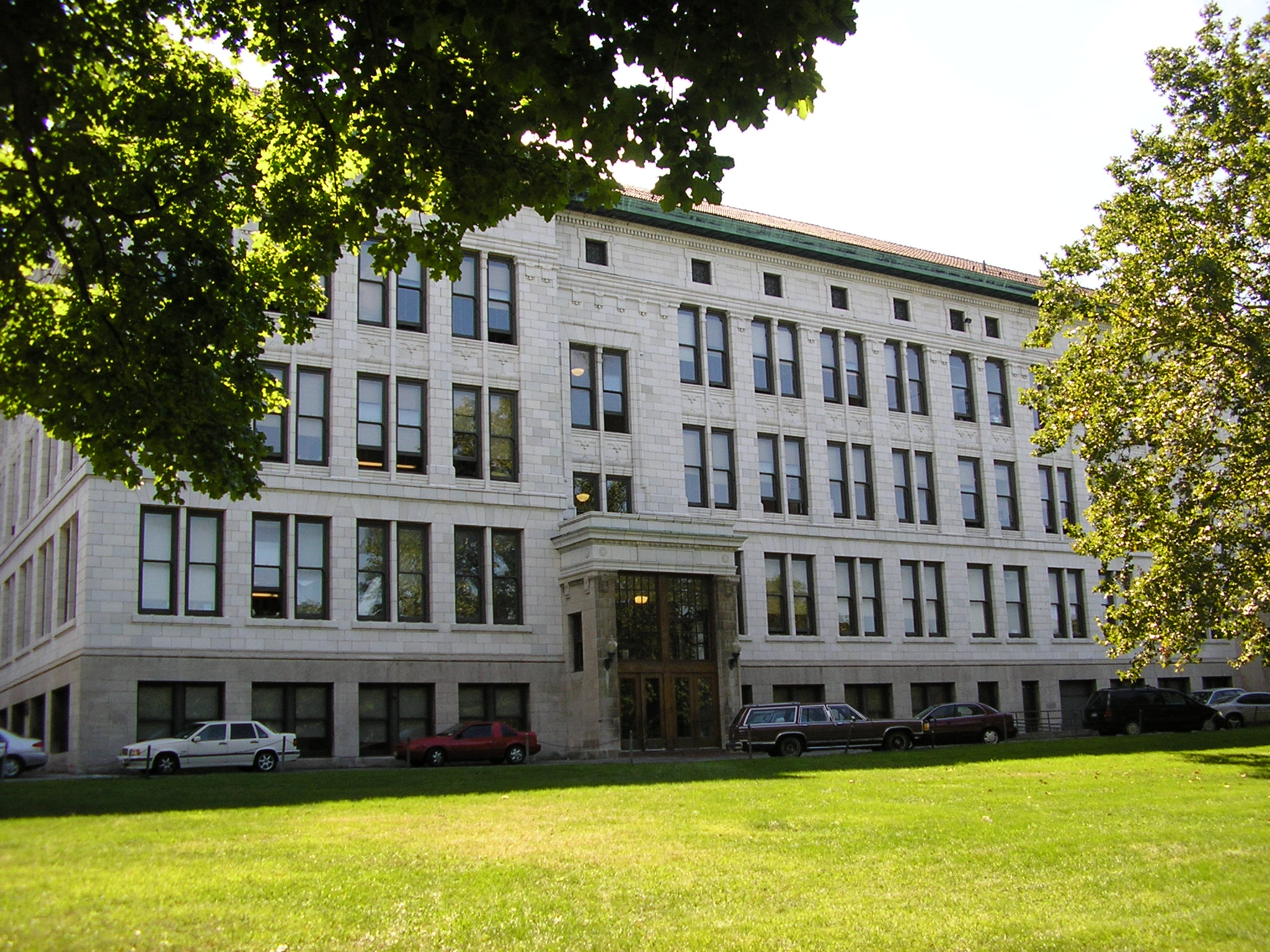
City Honors School

The Buffalo Public Schools have about thirty-four thousand students enrolled in their primary and secondary schools. The district administers about sixty public schools, including thirty-six primary schools, five middle high schools, fourteen high schools and three alternative schools, with a total of about 3,500 teachers. Its board of education, authorized by the state, has nine elected members who select the superintendent and oversee the budget, curriculum, personnel, and facilities. In 2020, the graduation rate was seventy-six percent. The public City Honors School was ranked the top high school in the city and 178th nationwide by U.S. News & World Report in 2021. There are twenty charter schools in Buffalo, with some oversight by the district. The city has over a dozen private schools, including Bishop Timon – St. Jude High School, Canisius High School, Mount Mercy Academy, and Nardin Academy—all Roman Catholic, and Darul Uloom Al-Madania and Universal School of Buffalo (both Islamic schools); nonsectarian options include Buffalo Seminary and the Nichols School.

=== Colleges and universities ===
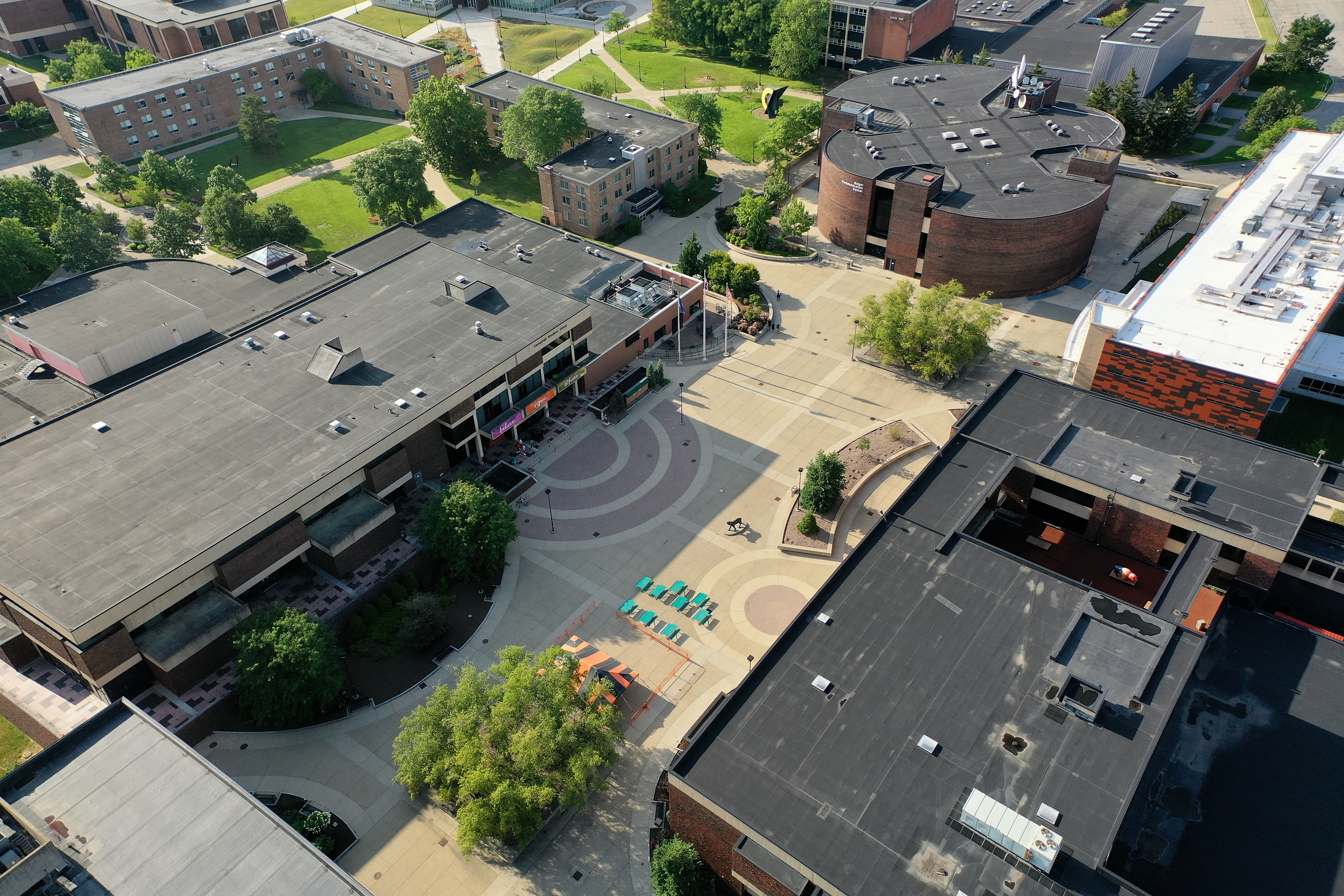
The quad at Buffalo State College

Founded by Millard Fillmore, the University at Buffalo (UB) is one of the State University of New York's two flagship universities and the state's largest public university. A Research I university, over 32,000 undergraduate, graduate and professional students attend its thirteen schools and colleges. Two of UB's three campuses (the South and Downtown Campuses) are in the city, but most university functions take place at the large North Campus in Amherst. In 2020, U.S. News & World Report ranked UB the 34th-best public university and 88th in national universities. Buffalo State College, founded as a normal school, is one of SUNY's thirteen comprehensive colleges. The city's four-year private institutions include Canisius University, D'Youville University, Trocaire College, and Villa Maria College. SUNY Erie, the county's two-year public higher-education institution, and the for-profit Bryant & Stratton College have small downtown campuses.

=== Libraries ===
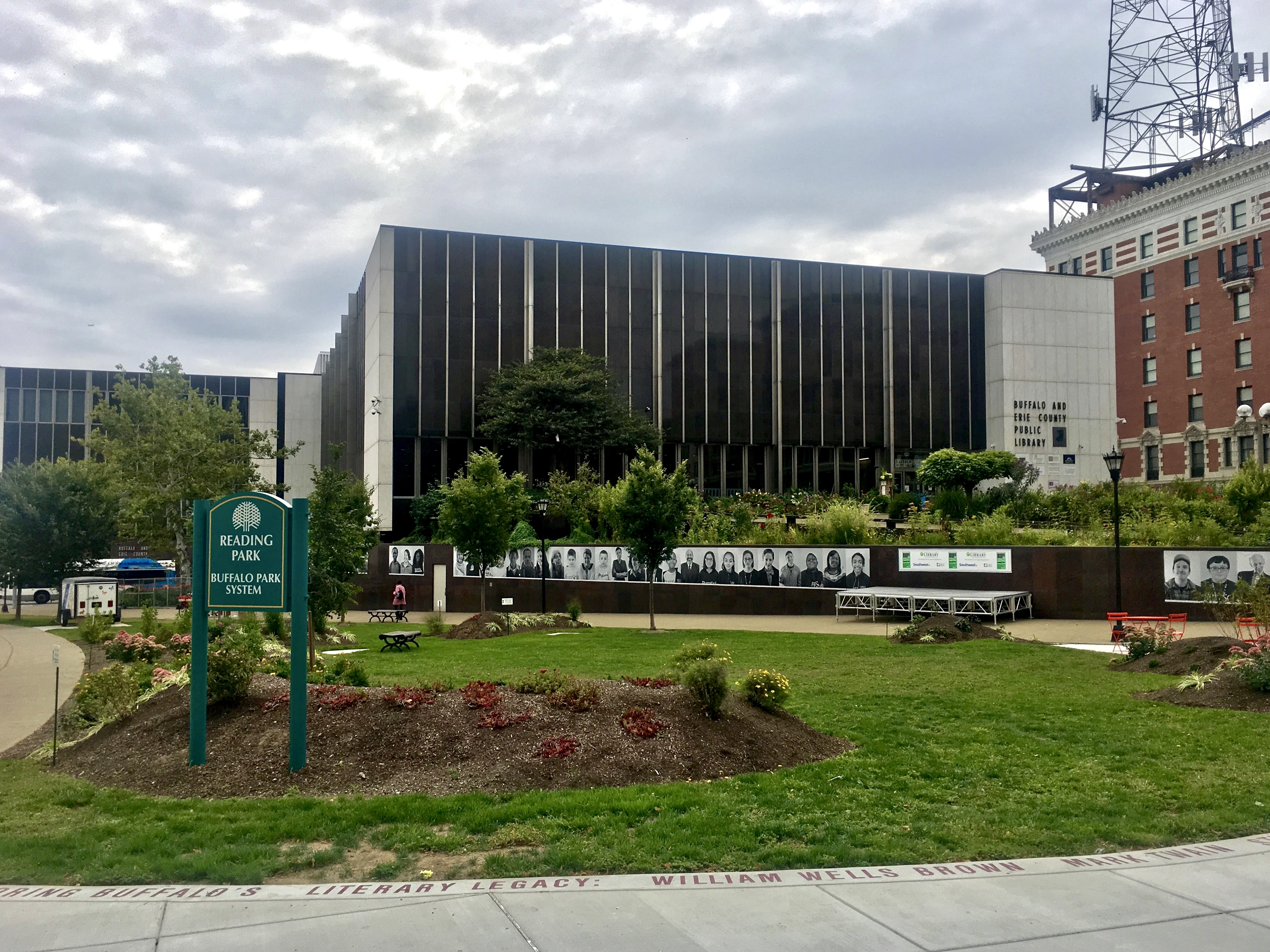
Reading Park at Buffalo's Central Library

Established in 1835, Buffalo's main library is the Central Library of the Buffalo & Erie County Public Library system. Rebuilt in 1964, it contains an auditorium, the original manuscript of the Adventures of Huckleberry Finn (donated by Mark Twain), and a collection of about two million books. Its Grosvenor Room maintains a special-collections listing of nearly five hundred thousand resources for researchers. A pocket park funded by Southwest Airlines opened in 2020, and brought landscaping improvements and seating to Lafayette Square. The system's free library cards are valid at the city's eight branch libraries and at member libraries throughout Erie County.

== Infrastructure ==
=== Healthcare ===
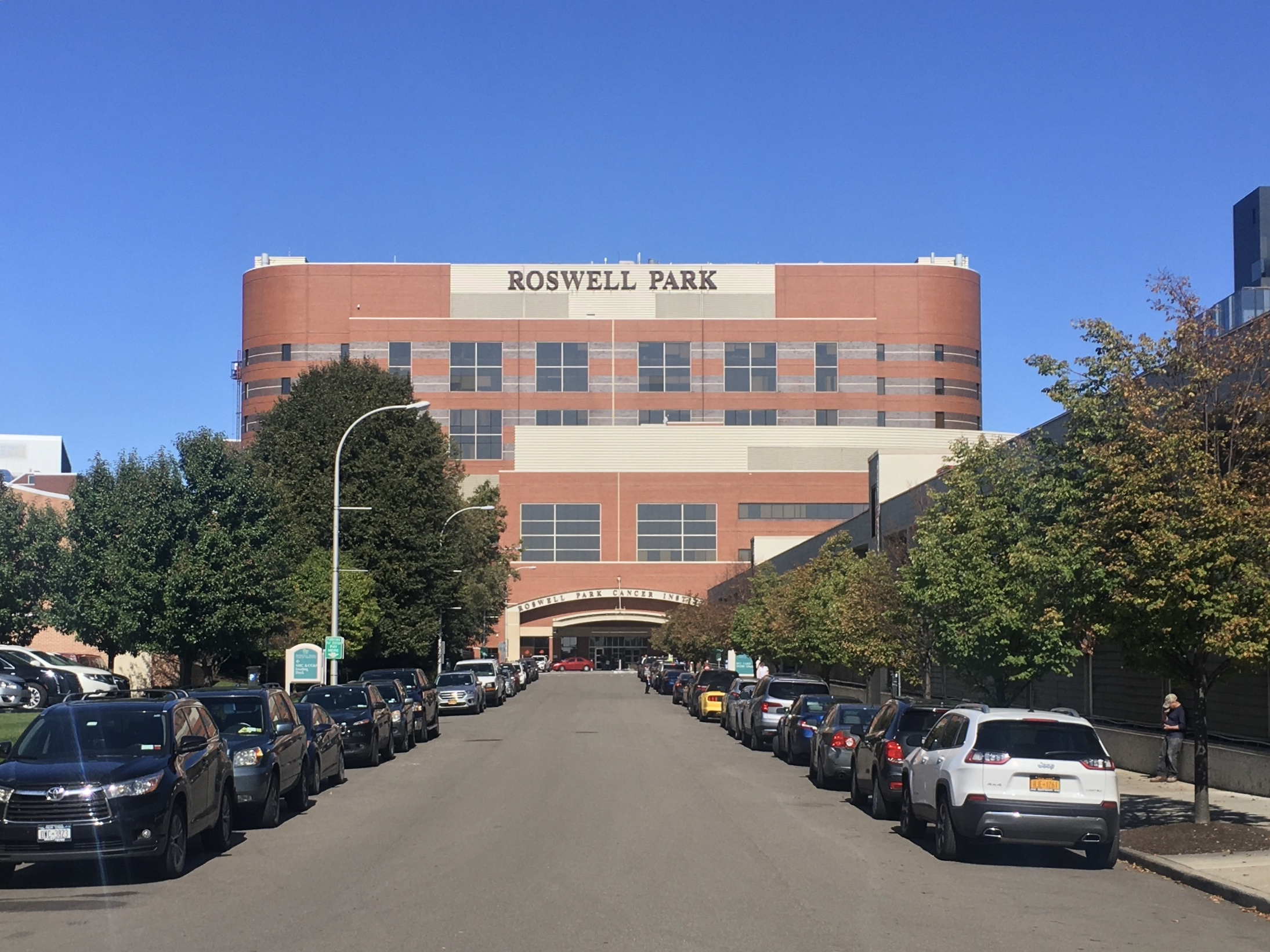
Roswell Park Comprehensive Cancer Center

Nine hospitals are operated in the city: Golisano Children's Hospital of Buffalo and Buffalo General Medical Center by Kaleida Health, Mercy Hospital and Sisters of Charity Hospital by Catholic Health, Roswell Park Comprehensive Cancer Center, the county-run Erie County Medical Center (ECMC), Buffalo VA Medical Center, BryLin (Psychiatric) Hospital and the state-operated Buffalo Psychiatric Center. Golisano Children's Hospital of Buffalo, built in 2017, is adjacent to Buffalo General Medical Center on the 120-acre (49 ha) Buffalo Niagara Medical Campus north of downtown; its Gates Vascular Institute specializes in acute stroke recovery. The medical campus includes the University at Buffalo Jacobs School of Medicine and Biomedical Sciences, the Hauptman-Woodward Medical Research Institute and Roswell Park Comprehensive Cancer Center, ranked the 14th-best cancer-treatment center in the United States by U.S. News & World Report. ECMC is the only Level I Adult Trauma center in Western New York, and Golisano Children's Hospital of Buffalo is the only Level I Pediatric Trauma Center in Western New York.

=== Transportation ===
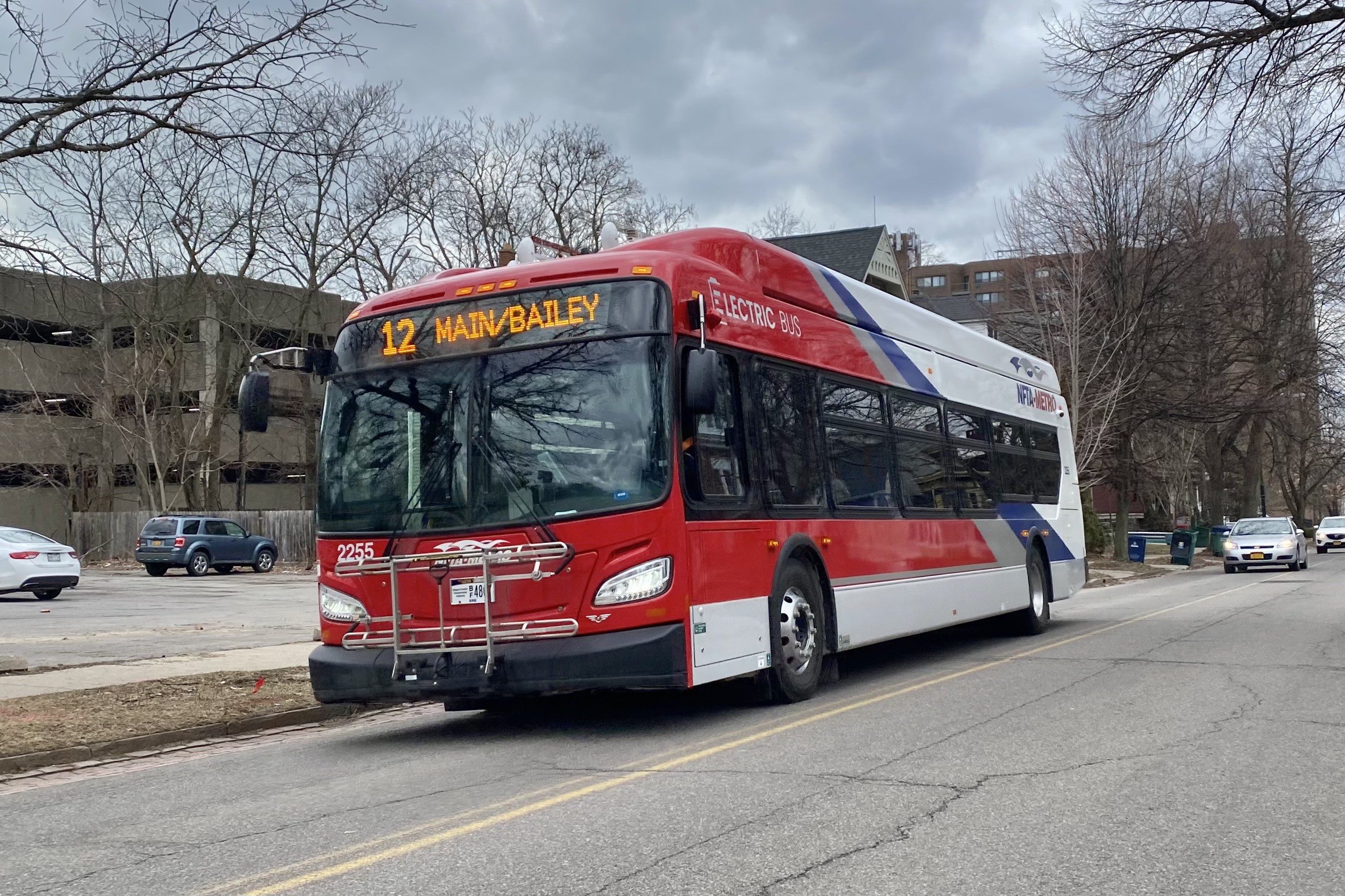
Niagara Frontier Transportation Authority electric bus in Elmwood Village

Growth and changing transportation needs altered Buffalo's grid plan, which was developed by Joseph Ellicott in 1804. His plan laid out streets like the spokes of a wheel, naming them after Dutch landowners and Native American tribes. City streets expanded outward, denser in the west and spreading out east of Main Street. Buffalo is a port of entry with Canada; the Peace Bridge crosses the Niagara River and links the Niagara Thruway (I-190) and Queen Elizabeth Way. I-190, NY 5 and NY 33 are the primary expressways serving the city, carrying a total of over 245,000 vehicles daily. (Note: Average annual daily traffic, 2019.) NY 5 carries traffic to the Southtowns, and NY 33 carries traffic to the eastern suburbs and the Buffalo Airport. The east-west Scajacquada Expressway (NY 198) bisects Delaware Park, connecting I-190 with the Kensington Expressway (NY 33) on the city's East Side to form a partial beltway around the city center. The Scajaquada and Kensington Expressways and the Buffalo Skyway (NY 5) have been targeted for redesign or removal. Other major highways include US 62 on the city's East Side; NY 354 and a portion of NY 130, both east–west routes; and NY 265, NY 266 and NY 384, all north–south routes on the city's West Side. Buffalo has a higher-than-average percentage of households without a car: 30 percent in 2015, decreasing to 28.2 percent in 2016; the 2016 national average was 8.7 percent. Buffalo averaged 1.03 cars per household in 2016, compared to the national average of 1.8.

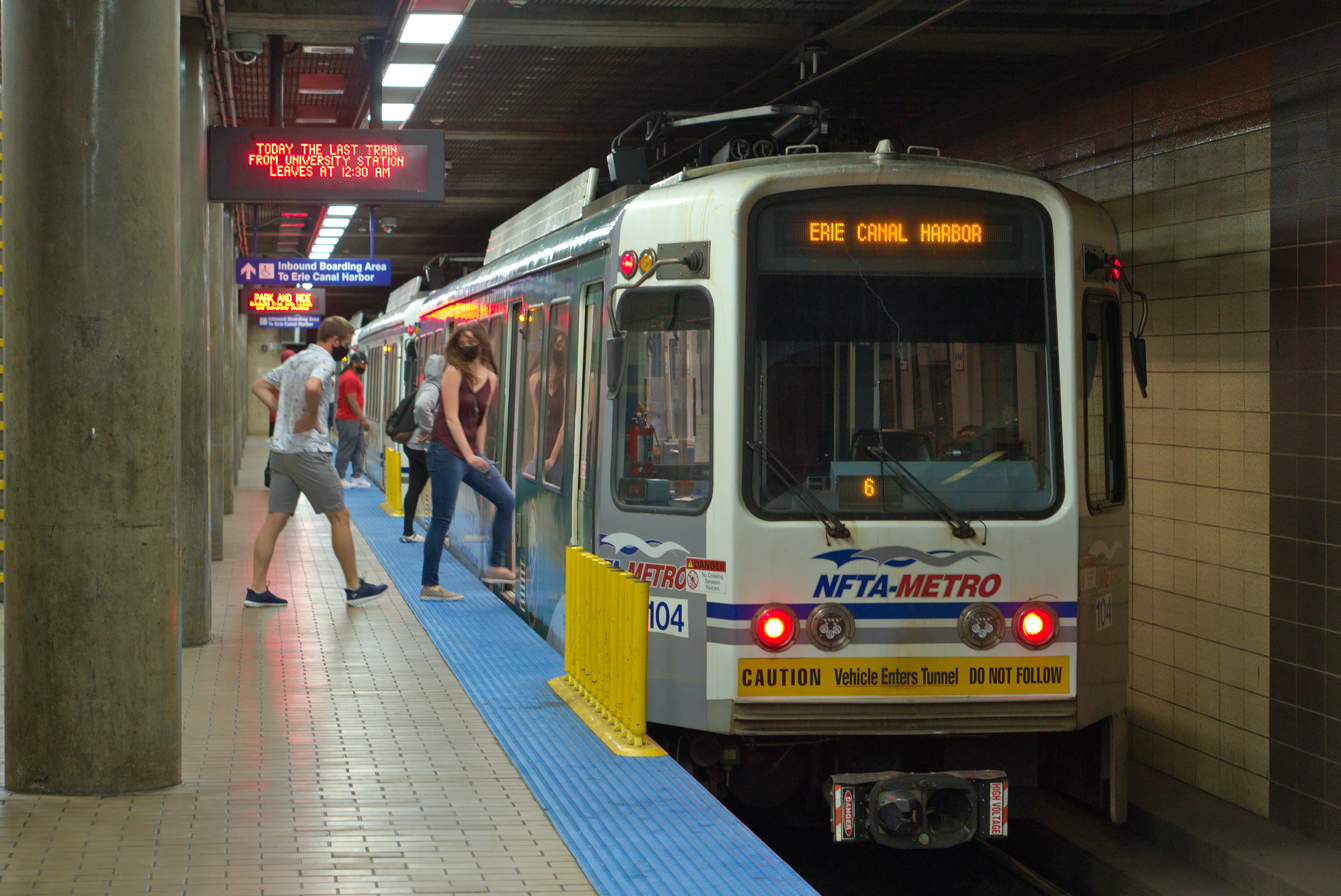
Buffalo Metro Rail train at the Amherst Street station

The Niagara Frontier Transportation Authority (NFTA) operates the region's public transit, including its airport, light-rail system, buses, and harbors. The NFTA operates 323 buses on 61 lines throughout Western New York. Buffalo Metro Rail is a 6.4 mi-long (10.3 km) line which runs from Canalside to the University Heights district. The line's downtown section, south of the Fountain Plaza station, runs at grade and is free of charge. The Buffalo area ranks twenty-third nationwide in transit ridership, with thirty trips per capita per year. Expansions have been proposed since Buffalo Metro Rail's inception in the 1980s, with the latest plan (in the late 2010s) reaching the town of Amherst. Buffalo Niagara International Airport in Cheektowaga has daily scheduled flights by domestic, charter and regional carriers. The airport handled nearly five million passengers in 2019. It received a J.D. Power award in 2018 for customer satisfaction at a mid-sized airport, and underwent a $50 million expansion in 2020–21. The airport, light rail, small-boat harbor and buses are monitored by the NFTA's transit police.

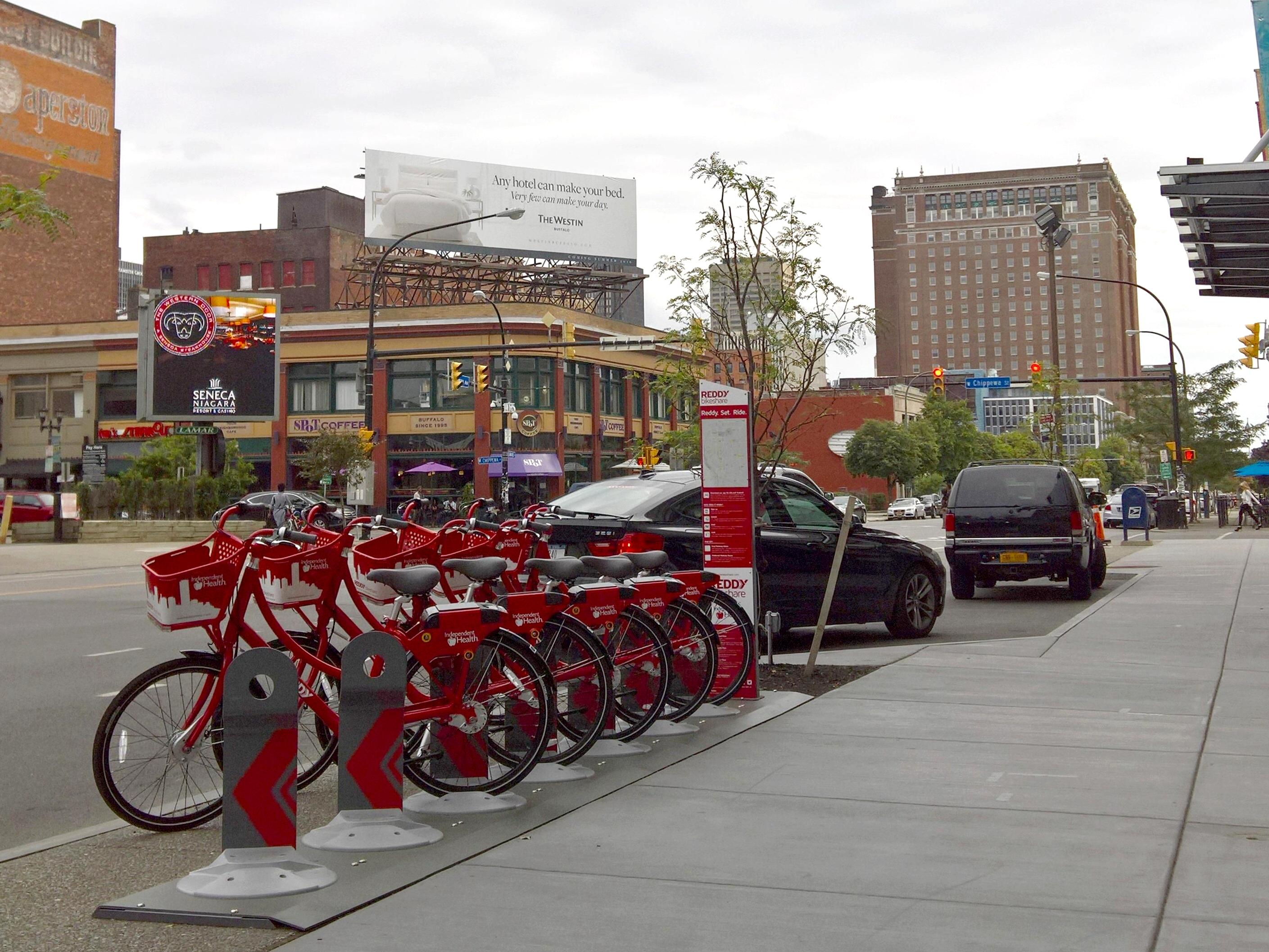
Reddy Bikeshare at 250 Delaware Avenue

Buffalo has an Amtrak intercity train station, Buffalo–Exchange Street station, which was rebuilt in 2020. The city's eastern suburbs are served by Amtrak's Buffalo–Depew station in Depew, which was built in 1979. Buffalo was a major stop on through routes between Chicago and New York City through the lower Ontario Peninsula; trains stopped at Buffalo Central Terminal, which operated from 1929 to 1979. Intercity buses depart and arrive from the NFTA's Metropolitan Transportation Center on Ellicott Street.

Since Buffalo adopted a complete streets policy in 2008, efforts have been made to accommodate cyclists and pedestrians into new infrastructure projects. Improved corridors have bike lanes, and Niagara Street received separate bike lanes in 2020. Walk Score gave Buffalo a "somewhat walkable" rating of 68 out of 100, with Allentown and downtown considered more walkable than other areas of the city.

=== Utilities ===
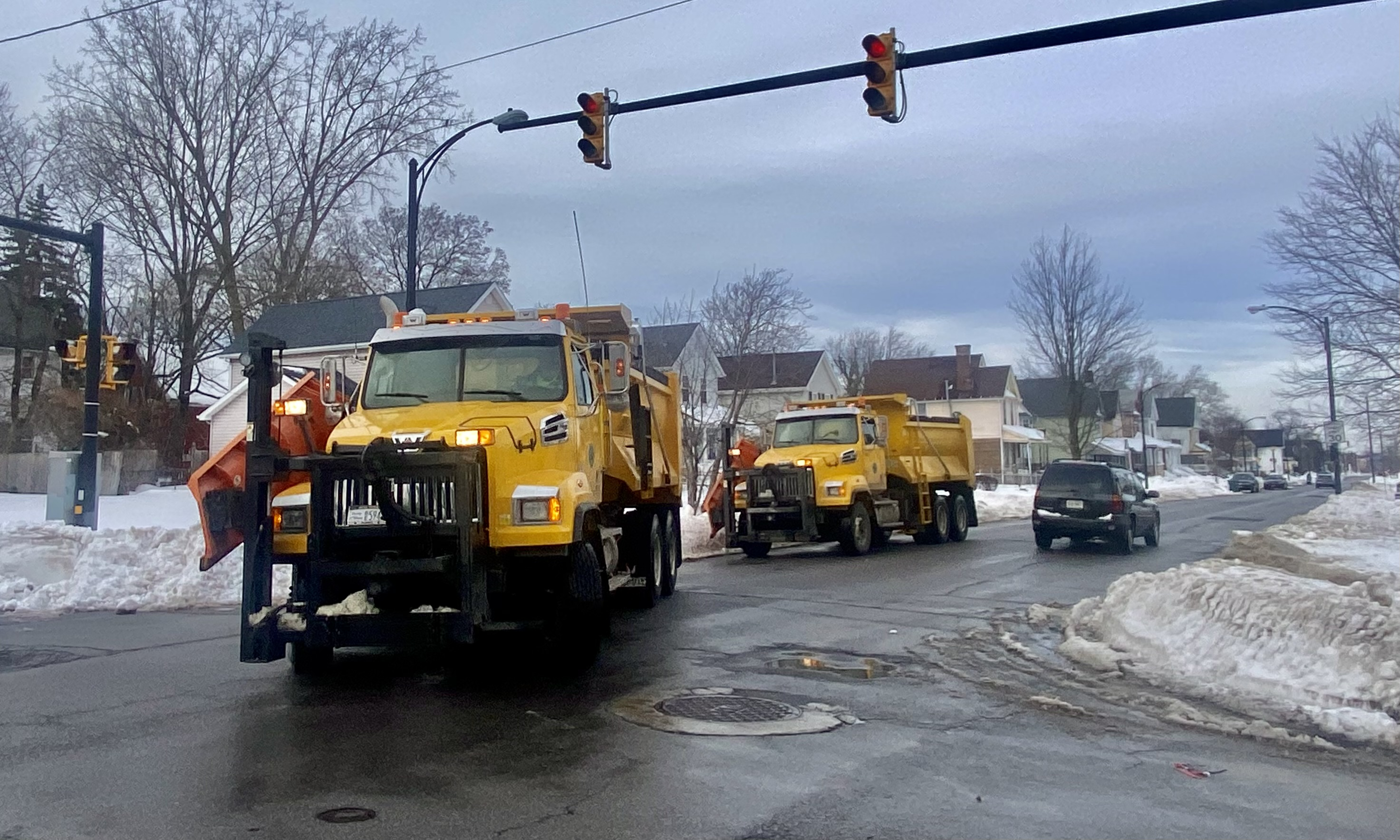
Erie County snow removal vehicles in Masten Park neighborhood, following the Blizzard of 2022

Buffalo's water system is operated by Veolia Water, and water treatment begins at the Colonel Francis G. Ward Pumping Station. When it opened in 1915, the station's capacity was second only to Paris. Wastewater is treated by the Buffalo Sewer Authority, its coverage extending to the eastern suburbs. National Grid and New York State Electric & Gas (NYSEG) provide electricity, and National Fuel Gas provides natural gas. The city's primary telecommunications provider is Spectrum; Verizon Fios serves the North Park neighborhood. A 2018 report by Ookla noted that Buffalo was one of the bottom five U.S. cities in average download speeds at 66 megabits per second.

The city's Department of Public Works manages Buffalo's snow and trash removal and street cleaning. Snow removal generally operates from November 15 to April 1. A snow emergency is declared by the National Weather Service after a snowstorm, and the city's roads, major sidewalks and bridges are cleared by over seventy snowplows within 24 hours. Rock salt is the principal agent for preventing snow accumulation and melting ice. Snow removal may coincide with driving bans and parking restrictions. The area along the Outer Harbor is the most dangerous driving area during a snowstorm; when weather conditions dictate, the Buffalo Skyway is closed by the city's police department.

To prevent ice jams which may impact hydroelectric plants in Niagara Falls, the New York Power Authority and Ontario Power Generation began installing an ice boom annually in 1964. The boom's installation date is temperature-dependent, and it is removed on April 1 unless there is more than 650 km^{2} (250 sq mi) of ice remaining on eastern Lake Erie. It stretches 2,680 m (8,790 ft) from the outer breakwall at the Buffalo Outer Harbor to the Canadian shore near Fort Erie. Originally made of wood, the boom now consists of steel pontoons.

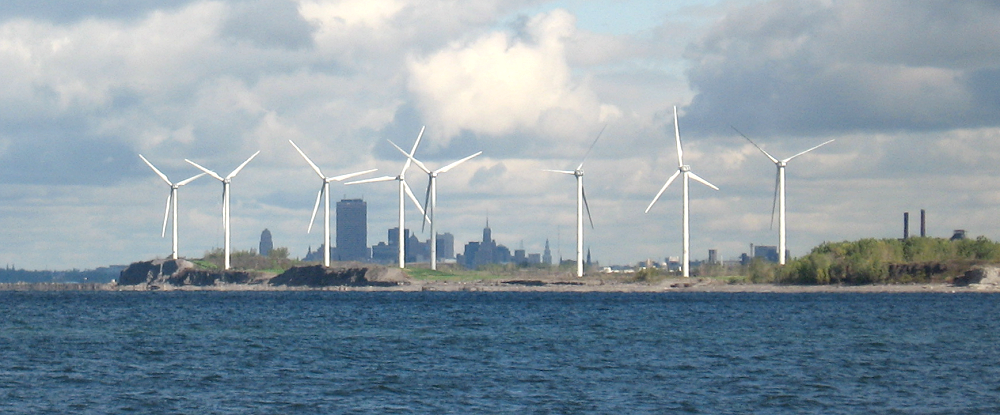
Steel Winds, a local wind farm, with the city of Buffalo seen in the background across Lake Erie

== Sister cities ==
Buffalo has eighteen sister cities:

- Aboadze, Ghana
- Baní, Dominican Republic
- Bursa, Turkey
- Cape Coast, Ghana (1976)
- Changzhou, China (2011)
- Dortmund, Germany (1972)
- Drohobych, Ukraine (2000)
- Horlivka, Ukraine (2007)
- Kanazawa, Japan (1962)
- Kiryat Gat, Israel (1977)
- Lille, France (1989)
- Rzeszów, Poland (1975)
- Saint Ann, Jamaica (2007)
- Siena, Italy (1961)
- Torremaggiore, Italy (2004)
- Wolverhampton, United Kingdom
- Yeongcheon, South Korea
- Yıldırım, Turkey (2010)

== See also ==
- Architecture of Buffalo, New York
- Buffalo buffalo Buffalo buffalo buffalo buffalo Buffalo buffalo
- Buffalo crime family
- Buffalo wing
- History of Buffalo, New York
- Index of New York (state)–related articles
- Inland Northern American English
- List of City of Buffalo landmarks and historic districts
- List of mayors of Buffalo, New York
- List of people from Buffalo, New York
- List of routes of City of Buffalo streetcars
- National Register of Historic Places listings in Buffalo, New York
- Open Data Buffalo
- Sports in Buffalo
- Politics and government of Buffalo, New York
- Timeline of Buffalo, New York
- USS Buffalo, 4 ships
