= Parks and recreation in Buffalo, New York =

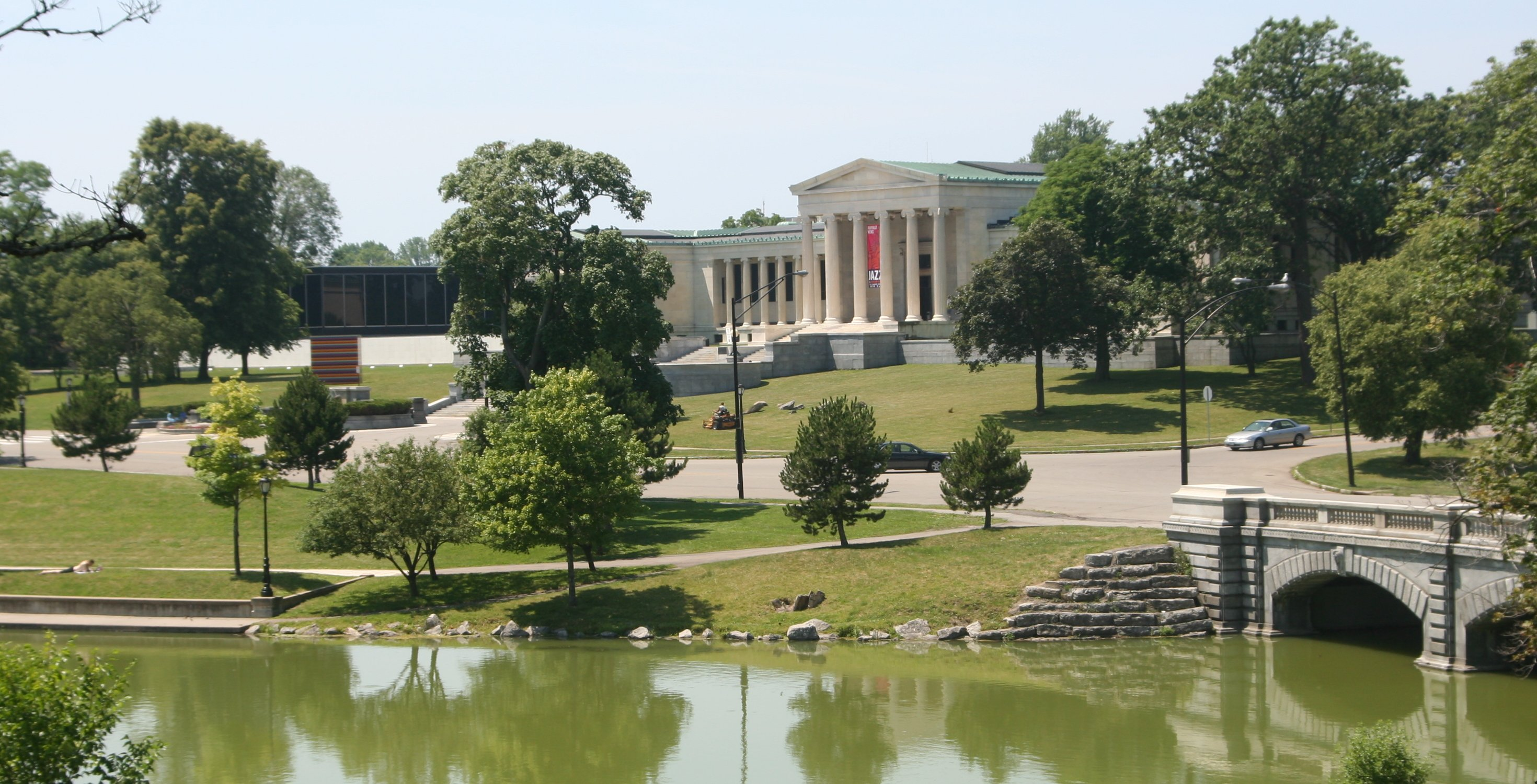
Hoyt Lake in Delaware Park, with the Albright-Knox Art Gallery.

Many of the public parks and parkways system of Buffalo, New York, were originally designed by Frederick Law Olmsted and Calvert Vaux between 1868 and 1896. They were inspired in large part by the parkland, boulevards, and squares of Paris, France. They include the parks, parkways and circles within the Cazenovia Park–South Park System and Delaware Park–Front Park System, both listed on the National Register of Historic Places and maintained by the Buffalo Olmsted Parks Conservancy.

== History ==
Frederick Law Olmsted described Buffalo as being "the best planned city [...] in the United States, if not the world". With encouragement from city stakeholders, he and Calvert Vaux created an augmentation of the city's grid plan by drawing inspiration from Paris, introducing landscape architecture while embracing aspects of the countryside. Their plan would introduce a system of interconnected parks, parkways and trails, unlike the singular Central Park in New York City. The largest of them would be Delaware Park, situated across the large Forest Lawn Cemetery to amplify the amount of open land planned. With construction of the system finishing in 1876, it is regarded as being the oldest in the country, although some of his plans were never fully realized. In the twentieth century, the diminishing parks would be afflicted by diseases, highway construction, and weather events such as Lake Storm Aphid in 2006. In 1939, Buffalo's avenues were lined with hundreds of thousands of elm trees, maintained by the city's forestry division. The elms, which made up 60 per cent of the trees, were nearly all wiped out by Dutch elm disease in the 1950s. From 1974 onwards, efforts were made to increase the tree cover, and since 2001 the city has maintained an inventory of its urban forest. The Buffalo Olmsted Park Conservancy, a non-profit organization, was created in 2004 to assist the city with protecting the 850 acres of parkland. Olmsted's work in Buffalo would inspire similar efforts in cities such as San Francisco, Chicago, and Boston.

== Current parks ==
The city's Division of Parks and Recreation manages over 180 parks and facilities, seven recreational centers, 21 pools and splash pads, and three ice rinks. The 350 acres (140 ha) Delaware Park features the Buffalo Zoo, Hoyt Lake, a golf course, and playing fields. Buffalo collaborated with sister city Kanazawa in Japan to create the park's Japanese Garden in 1970, where cherry blossoms bloom in the spring. Shakespeare in Delaware Park has run every year since 1976 and attracts more 40,000 visitors from across the country. Tifft Nature Preserve in South Buffalo sits on 264 acres (107 ha) of remediated industrial land, opening in 1976. The preserve offers trails for hiking and cross-country skiing, marshland with fishing permitted, and is an Important Bird Area. Also in South Buffalo is the Olmsted-designed Cazenovia and South Parks, the latter home to the Buffalo and Erie County Botanical Gardens. According to the Trust for Public Land, Buffalo's 2020 ParkScore ranking showed high marks in access to parks, with 90% of city residents living within a ten-minute walk of a park. However, the city ranked lower for acreage; 7.6% of city land is devoted to parks, compared to about 15% for Minneapolis.

== List of parks ==
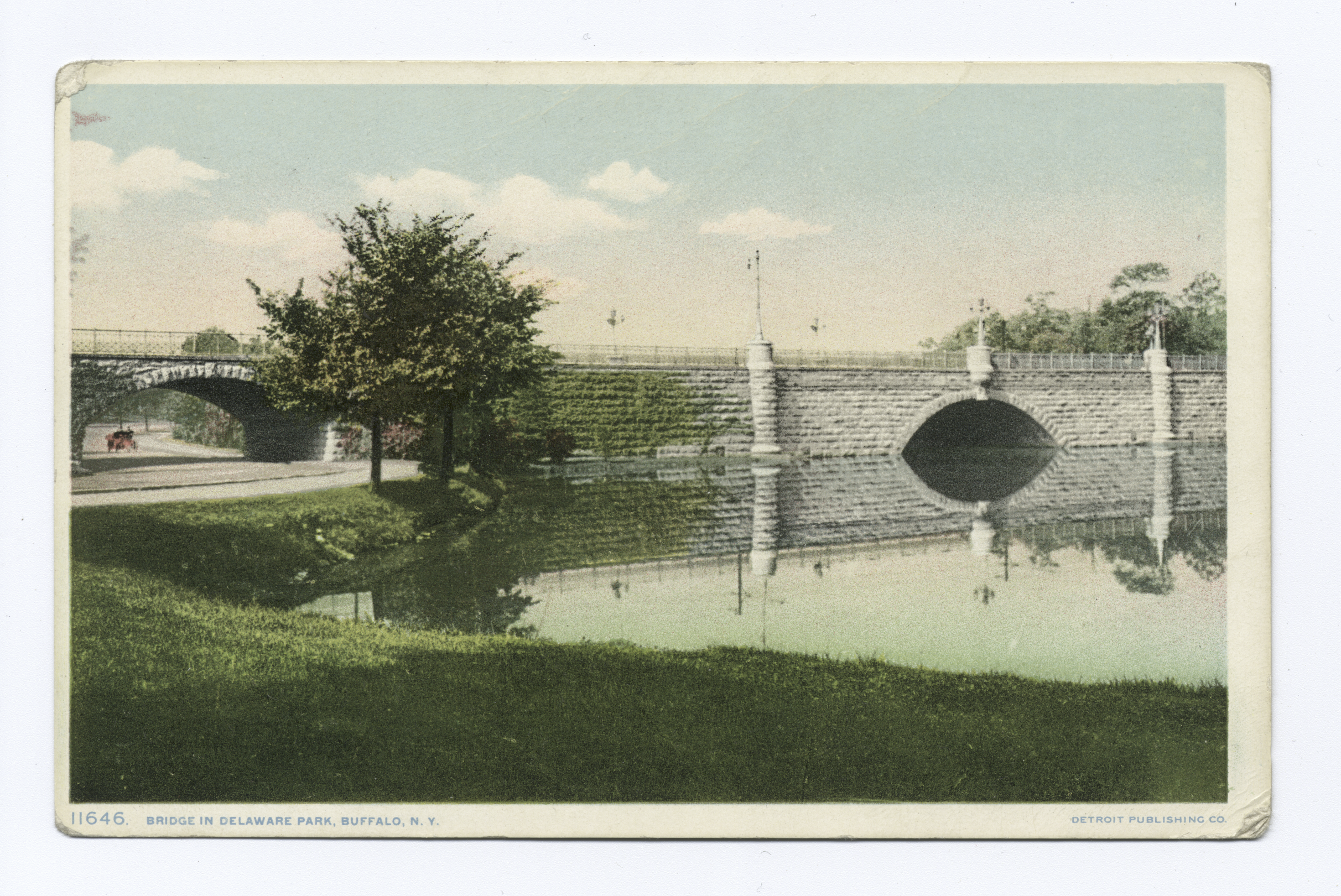
Historical postcard illustrating a bridge in Delaware Park.

- Cazenovia Park
- Day's Park
- The Park (now Delaware Park)
- The Front (now Front Park)
- The Parade (AKA Humboldt Park, now Martin Luther King, Jr. Park)
- Riverside Park
- South Park

== Park approaches ==
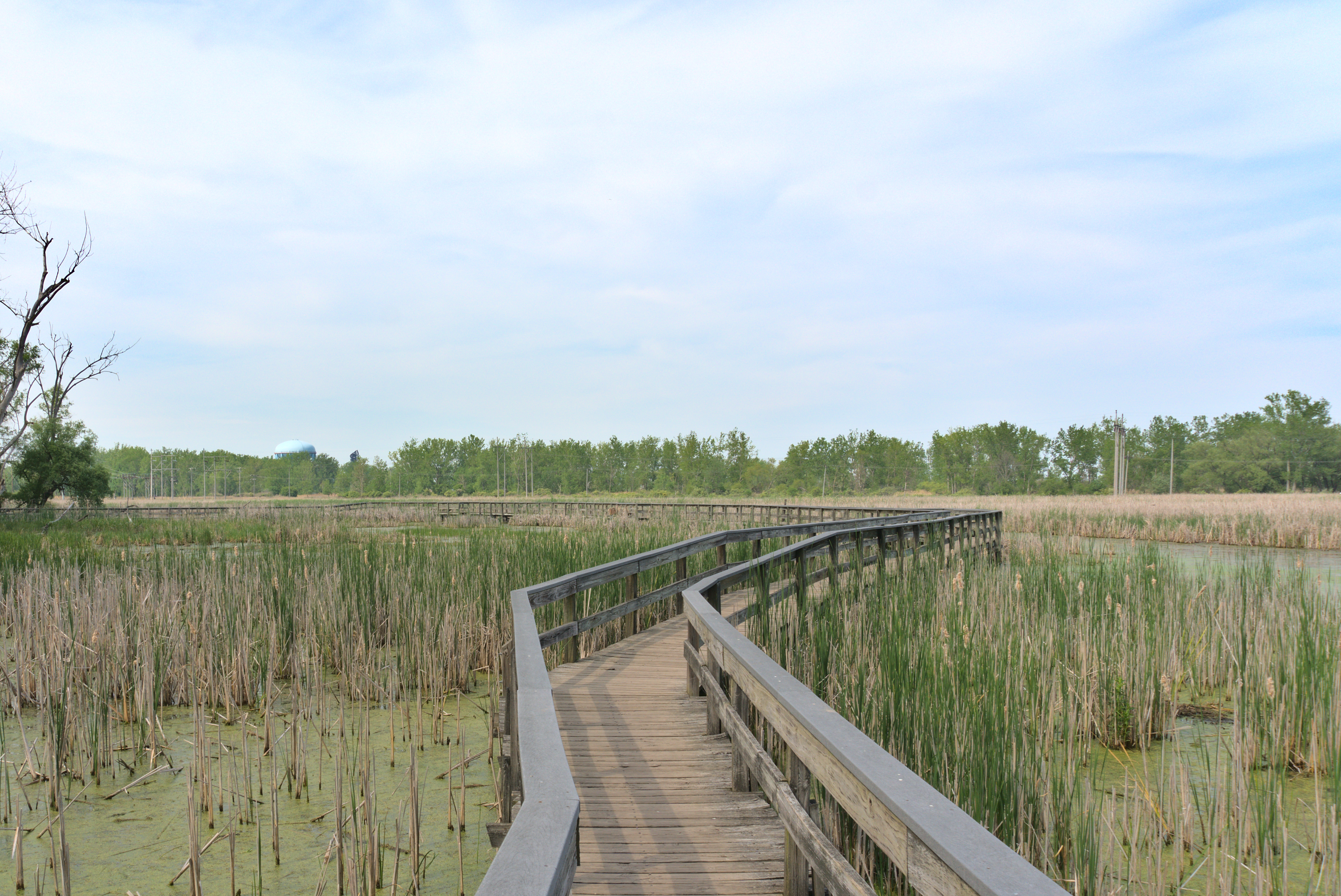
Tifft Nature Preserve

=== Parkways ===
- Bidwell Parkway
- Chapin Parkway
- Humboldt Parkway (lost)
- Lincoln Parkway
- South Side Parkway (now McKinley Parkway)
- Porter Avenue
- Red Jacket Parkway
- The Avenue (now Richmond Avenue)

=== Circles ===
- Bidwell Place (now Colonial Circle)
- Ferry Circle
- Chapin Place (now Gates Circle)
- Woodside Circle (now McClellan Circle)
- McKinley Circle (only partly constructed, finally completed in 2002)
- Soldier's Place (now Soldier's Circle)
- The Circle (now Symphony Circle)

== Gardens ==
- Buffalo and Erie County Botanical Gardens, located within South Park.

== Nature Preserves ==
- Tifft Nature Preserve, operated by the Buffalo Museum of Science
