= Conference Academy =

Conference Academy may refer to:

- Delaware Conference Academy, predecessor of University of Maryland Eastern Shore in Princess Anne, Maryland
- Troy Conference Academy, predecessor to Green Mountain College in Poultney, Vermont
- Wilmington Conference Academy, predecessor of Wesley College (Delaware) in Dover, Delaware
