= Olmsted Park System =

Olmsted Park System may refer to:

- Emerald Necklace, Boston and Brookline, Massachusetts, also known as Olmsted Park System (and listed on the National Register of Historic Places (NRHP) under that name)
- Parkways of Louisville, Kentucky, also known as Olmsted Park System (and listed on the NRHP under that name)
- Buffalo, New York parks system, known locally as the Olmsted Park System
