= List of botanical gardens and arboretums in Vermont =

This list of botanical gardens and arboretums in Vermont is intended to include all significant botanical gardens and arboretums in the U.S. state of Vermont

Name	Image	Affiliation	City
One World Conservation Center (Closed)			Bennington
Vermont Experimental Cold Hardy Cactus Garden (Private Garden)			Middlebury
Green Mountain College (Closed)			Poultney
Biblical Gardens of the First Congregational Church			Fair Haven

== See also ==
- List of botanical gardens and arboretums in the United States
