= Martin Luther King Jr. Park =

- U.S. National Register of Historic Places
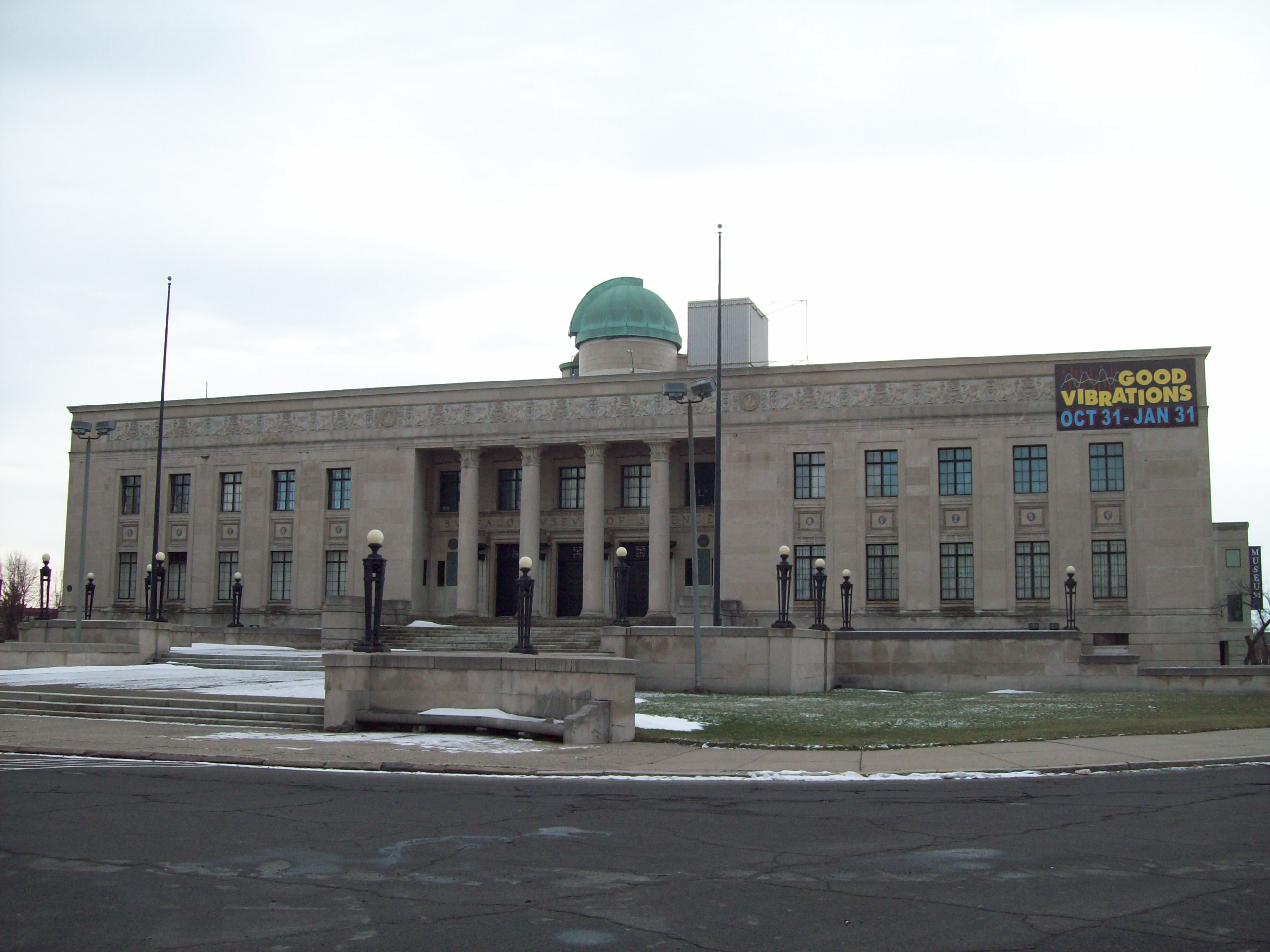
- Buffalo Museum of Science, December 2009

- Location within New York Location within the United States
- Location: Roughly bounded by Northampton St., E. Parade Ave., Best St. and Kensington Expressway, Buffalo, New York
- Coordinates: 42°54′19″N 78°50′26″W
- Area: 56 acres (23 ha)
- Built: 1874
- Architect: Olmsted, Olmsted & Eliot; Olmsted, Frederick L.
- MPS: Olmsted Parks and Parkways TR
- NRHP reference No.: 82005027
- Added to NRHP: March 30, 1982

There is also a Martin Luther King, Jr., Park in Oberlin, Ohio.

Martin Luther King Jr. Park, originally The Parade and after 1896, Humboldt Park, is a historic park located in Buffalo in Erie County, New York. The park is located in east Buffalo and bisected by Fillmore Avenue.

The park was listed on the National Register of Historic Places in 1982. The park is on a 56-acre (23 ha), slightly L-shaped site and was originally conceived as a place for military displays and active children's sports. It contains four contributing structures: The brick Shelter House (1904), Buffalo Museum of Science building (1926), Greenhouse (1907), and Humboldt Park Casino (ca. 1926).

== History ==
The park was designed in 1874 by Frederick Law Olmsted and originally connected to Delaware Park via the Humboldt Parkway. That connection was lost in the early 1960s with the construction of the Kensington Expressway. The park originally contained a large wooden refectory, designed by Calvert Vaux; it was destroyed by fire in 1877.

In July 2009, a neatly manicured, tree-and flower-filled pedestrian pathway was unveiled by the Buffalo Olmsted Parks Conservancy.

== See also ==
- Buffalo, New York parks system
