= Sandra Elkin =

American television talk show host (1938–2023)

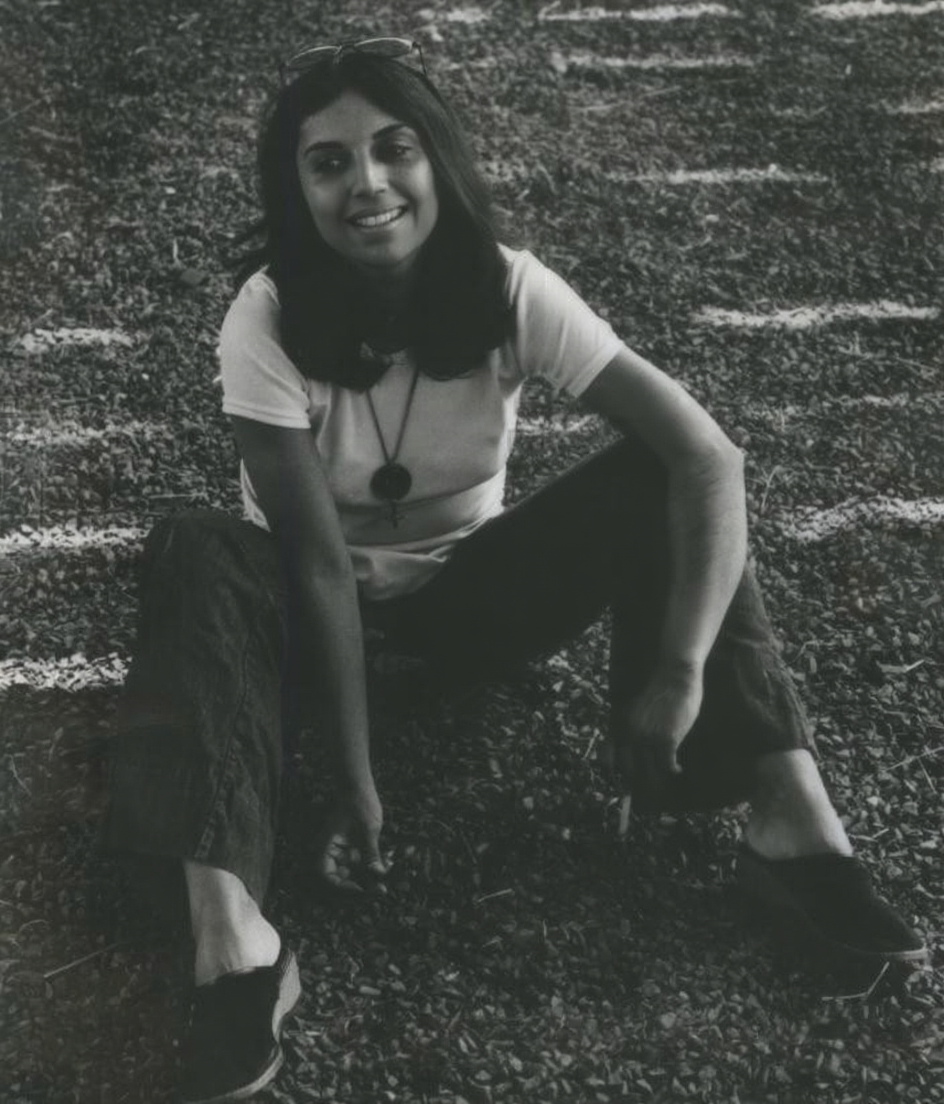
- Elkin c. 1975
- Born: Sandra Marotti; October 16, 1938; Rutland, Vermont, U.S.
- Died: November 8, 2023 (aged 85); New York City, U.S.
- Education: Green Mountain College; Columbia University
- Occupation(s): Talk show host, literary agent, photographer
- Years active: 1972–2023
- Known for: Creation of the talk show Woman
- Spouse: Saul Elkin
- Children: 2

Sandra Elkin (October 16, 1938 – November 8, 2023) was an American television talk show host. She was the producer and host of the pioneering PBS program Woman, a half-hour public affairs show focused on women's issues.

A native of Vermont, she pursued a degree in theatre, where she met her husband, theatre director Saul Elkin. Together, they moved to Buffalo, New York, where Elkin sent in a suggestion to WNED-TV in 1972 for a woman-focused talk show that addressed women's issues, serious topics such as rape and abortion, and would conduct discussions with supporters of the women's liberation movement. She was the producer and host of the show Woman for five years until its cancellation in 1977. She would go on to be a literary and software agent before spending her later years as a photographer.

== Early life and education ==
Born to Mr. and Mrs. John Marotti in Rutland, Vermont, Elkin attended Rutland High School, where she directed a play that won state prizes and was submitted to the New England Drama Festival. She continued her education at Green Mountain College and Columbia University where she obtained a degree in theatre. She and her husband moved to Buffalo, New York, in 1969.

== Career ==
=== Creation of Woman (1972–1973) ===
In early 1972, Elkin wrote to the program director at WNED-TV, John Hutchinson, suggesting a show for women and about women. He agreed with her plan within two weeks and made her a producer for the show. Elkin came up with a list of topics that she as a woman was concerned about and established what the first thirty episodes would be focused on, though she noted that women writing into the show afterwards with their suggestions meant she would never have to think up topics on her own ever again. The show's basic discussion of topics for women, such as contraception, menopause, and sexual health, also helped women understand things about themselves and what similar things other women were facing, causing them to write to Elkin about their own experiences, with the simple knowledge about topics previously undiscussed being acknowledged by her viewers as "radicalizing" them towards pushing for women's rights issues.

Officially starting her show Woman in October 1972 at a local Buffalo television station, it became regionally famous, which led to the show being picked up by the Eastern Educational Network. The show was later moved to PBS in 1974, expanding its reach to a national level, and was broadcast on other major networks, including WFSU-TV. The program focused on topics including women's studies, raising awareness of women's issues, discussing mother-daughter relationships, and broaching difficult subjects including rape and sex discrimination. Since the show began before the expansion of the women's rights movements in the 1970s, Elkin chose to interview women who were outspoken and would be "outrageous" in their questioning of the current state of women's rights. Though, overall, she desired to convey practical information in her show, which is why she chose a serious moderator tone in her interviews and avoided the "talk show games" trying to trip up interviewees used by other programs.

=== Hosting, expansion, and cancellation (1974–1977) ===
From the second season of the show onward, Elkin moved from being a producer to the host of the show. During the summer of 1975, she conducted a cross-country trip to interview women across the United States to look for "feminist consciousness" in various locations. Impressed with the level of such discussions happening even in small communities, she noted that in addition to the men who opposed women's equality, it was the "upper, middle class white suburban housewife" that proved a concern due to their lack of involvement or action for their own rights, since they had the "most to lose" from standing up to their husbands. Elkin additionally said that she considered feminism to be closely associated with humanism, though thought it was too soon for the women's movement to focus on that broader topic before accomplishing more urgent goals. She found lesbianism to be a possible topic of focus in the short term, along with wanting more focus on the economic inequality facing older women.

The show's large number of guests included popular and well-known proponents of women's rights, such as Betty Friedan, Gloria Steinem, Dorothy Pitman Hughes, and Susan Brownmiller. Elkin also made a note of having on women and others who were generally considered "enemies" toward feminism and the women's rights movements, including Phyllis Schlafly, Midge Decter, and George Gilder, wanting their perspectives on the same topics that feminists frequently discussed. By 1977, over 200 PBS stations were airing the show across the United States. In May of that year, she traveled to El Paso, Texas, to attend the National Organization for Women south central regional conference as the featured speaker, where she discussed women's health politics.

In June 1977, however, it was announced that the Woman series would not be renewed by PBS for the following season set to air at the end of 1977. It was stated by WNED-TV President J. Michael Collins that the show and the station had asked for an expanded budget for the season so more filmed segments and fewer studio shows, including potential documentary episodes, could be done. But PBS refused and demanded all producers do only studio shows, which was complied with. Then, during contract renewal, Woman was passed over for a different women's show that was instead given higher production values in their contract for a more magazine segment format.

Elkin also wrote a monthly column for Working Woman.

=== Later work and photography (1978–2023) ===
Afterwards, Elkin moved to Manhattan where she continued separate television production and worked as a literary agent. She established a literary agency in 1979 with Barbara Seaman and began working on an assigned book for Doubleday. In the early 1980s, she changed from being a literary agent to working as an agent for software developers, forming the company Electronic Media Associates with Maureen Whalen.

Elkin would later decide to pursue a career in photography in 2001. She decided to go on a world tour to work on a portrait portfolio titled "Women of the Globe". She returned to New York by 2008 and heard from many of her friends their concerns about threats to democracy. To investigate this, she went across Vermont and interviewed town clerks responsible for the voting process, specifically 19 women representative of this group. She then put together an audiovisual exhibit with the photos and interviews titled "Women Town Clerks of Vermont – Reflections on Democracy" with the financial assistance of the company Green Screen Graphics, as the arts councils of Vermont and New York refused to extend financing for the project. She continued to tour the exhibition across Vermont in 2011, including at the Vermont Folklife Center.

== Awards and honors ==
On October 13, 1976, Elkin was among those women honoured by the State University of Buffalo for their professional achievements and community service.

== Personal life ==
Elkin met her husband, actor and theatre director Saul Elkin, while performing at the Green Mountain summer stock where Saul was the play season director. They lived in Buffalo, New York, and had two sons. Together with her husband, she conducted theatre performances through the University of Buffalo theatre department, including staging plays at Delaware Park.

Elkin died of a heart attack at her Manhattan home, aged 85, on November 8, 2023.
