= All Saints Roman Catholic Church (Buffalo, New York) =

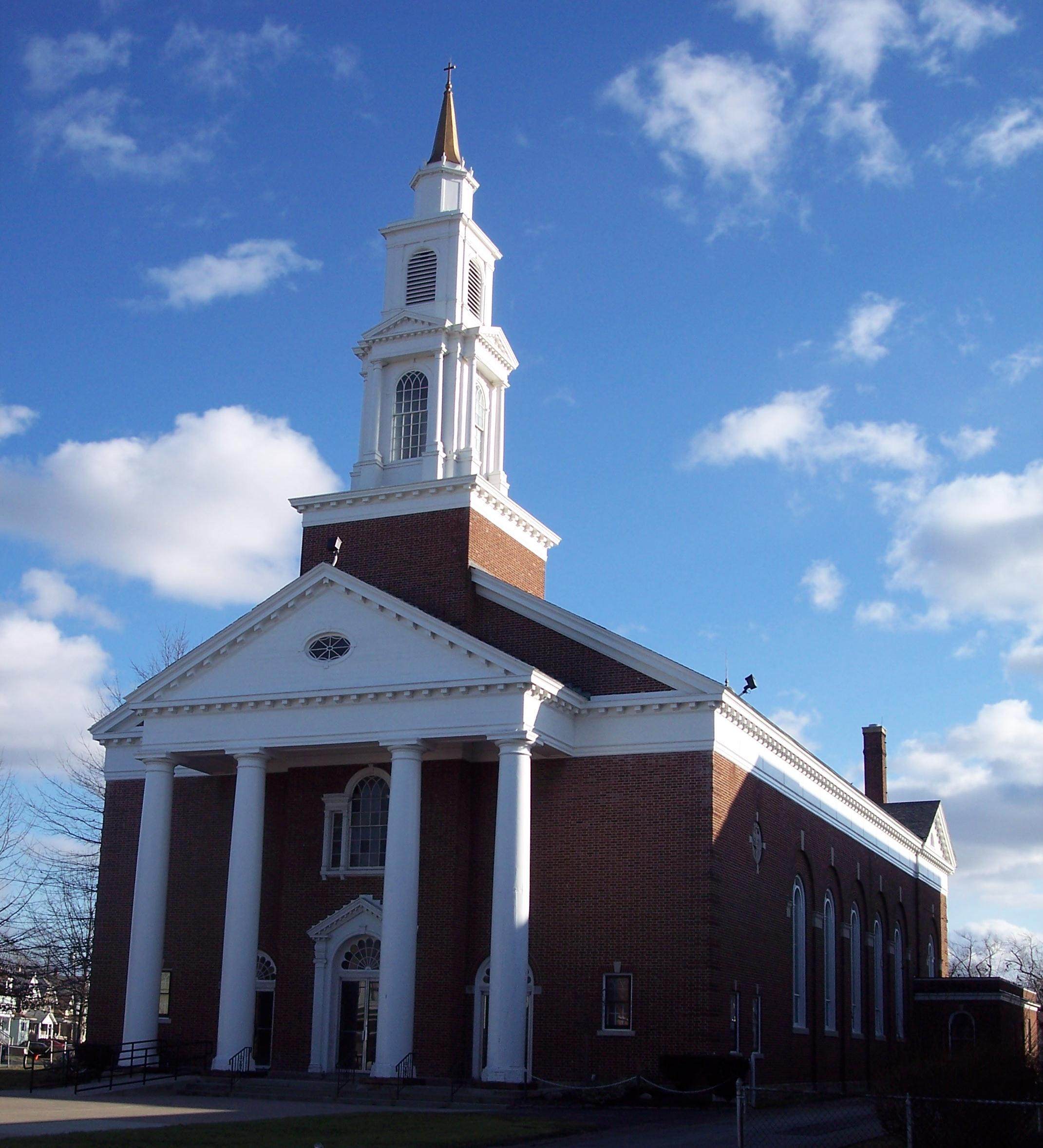
- All Saints Roman Catholic Church
- 42.956851°N 78.903117°W
- Location: 127 Chadduck Ave, Buffalo, New York
- Country: United States
- Denomination: Roman Catholic
- Website: All Saints Roman Catholic Church

History
- Status: Parish church
- Founded: December 14, 1911
- Dedicated: December 27, 1937 (new church)

Architecture
- Functional status: "Closed"
- Architect(s): Blay & Lyman
- Style: Colonial style
- Completed: November, 1938
- Construction cost: US$ 100 thousand

Specifications
- Capacity: 840
- Materials: Brick, Stone

Clergy
- Pastor: Angelo Chimera

All Saints Roman Catholic Church is a former Roman Catholic church located at 127 Chadduck Ave, Buffalo, New York, in the Buffalo, New York's Riverside neighborhood. It was part of the Diocese of Buffalo.

== History ==
Bishop Charles H. Colton sought to establish a new parish in center of growing Buffalo Riverside neighborhood. He sought out Rev. Henry Dolan to construct the new parish. In 1911, the original church was built of a wood-frame construction in only 11 days. In March 1913, a fire destroyed the church. Shortly after, construction of the parish school building was completed. Without a church building to worship in, the congregation used the basement of the school building.

On October 17, 1937, construction began on the present day colonial style church. The cornerstone was laid on December 27 of 1937, and the church was completed in November 1938. The church can seat a congregation of 840.

All Saints Roman Catholic Church contains a 1923 Wurlitzer Organ that was gift from Ellsworth Statler. The organ was originally installed in the Statler Hotel golden ballroom in downtown Buffalo. On June 1 of 1938, the church acquired and installed the organ in their parish. The organ was later rebuilt in 1991.

The parish closed in July 2024.

== Gallery ==
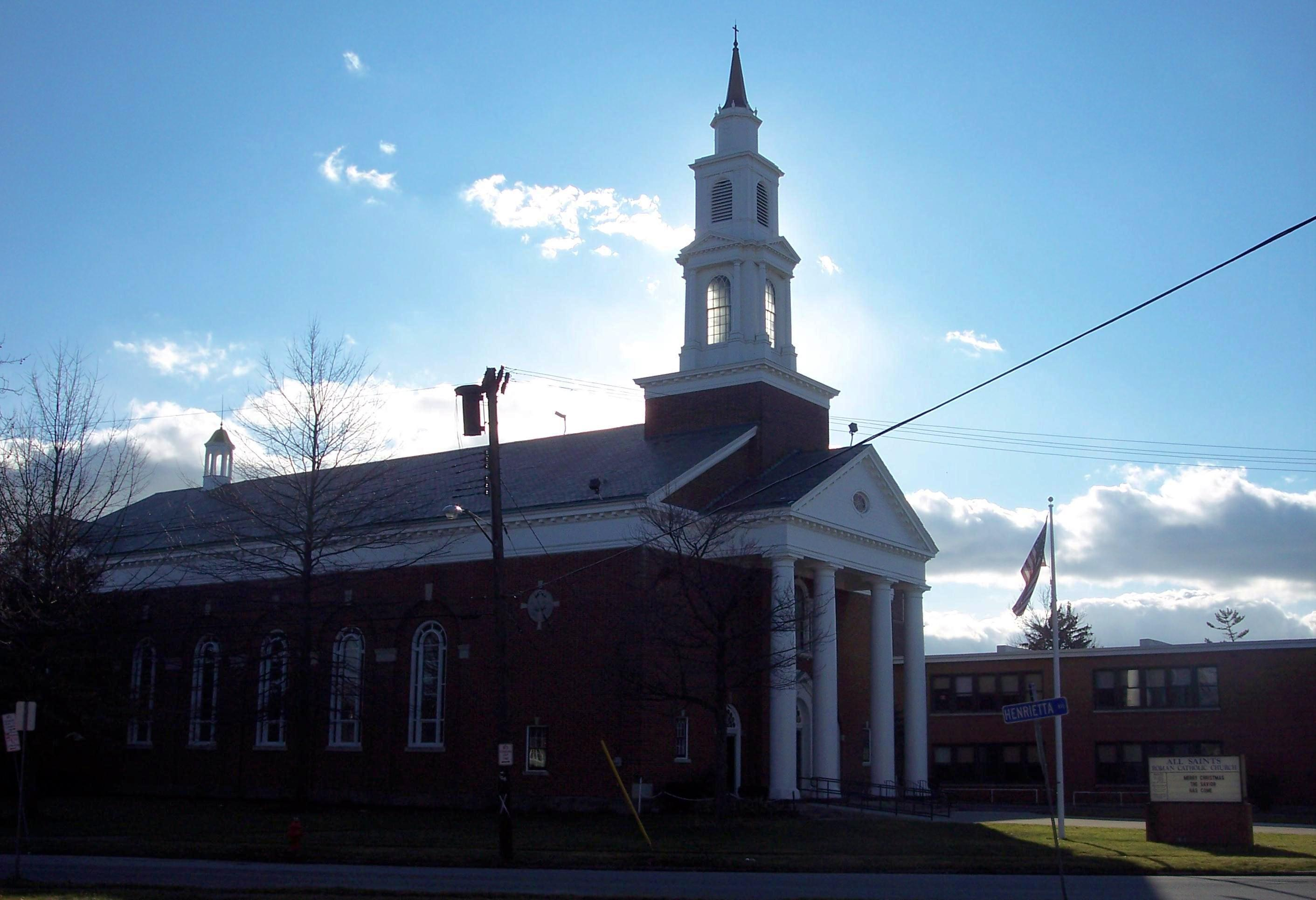

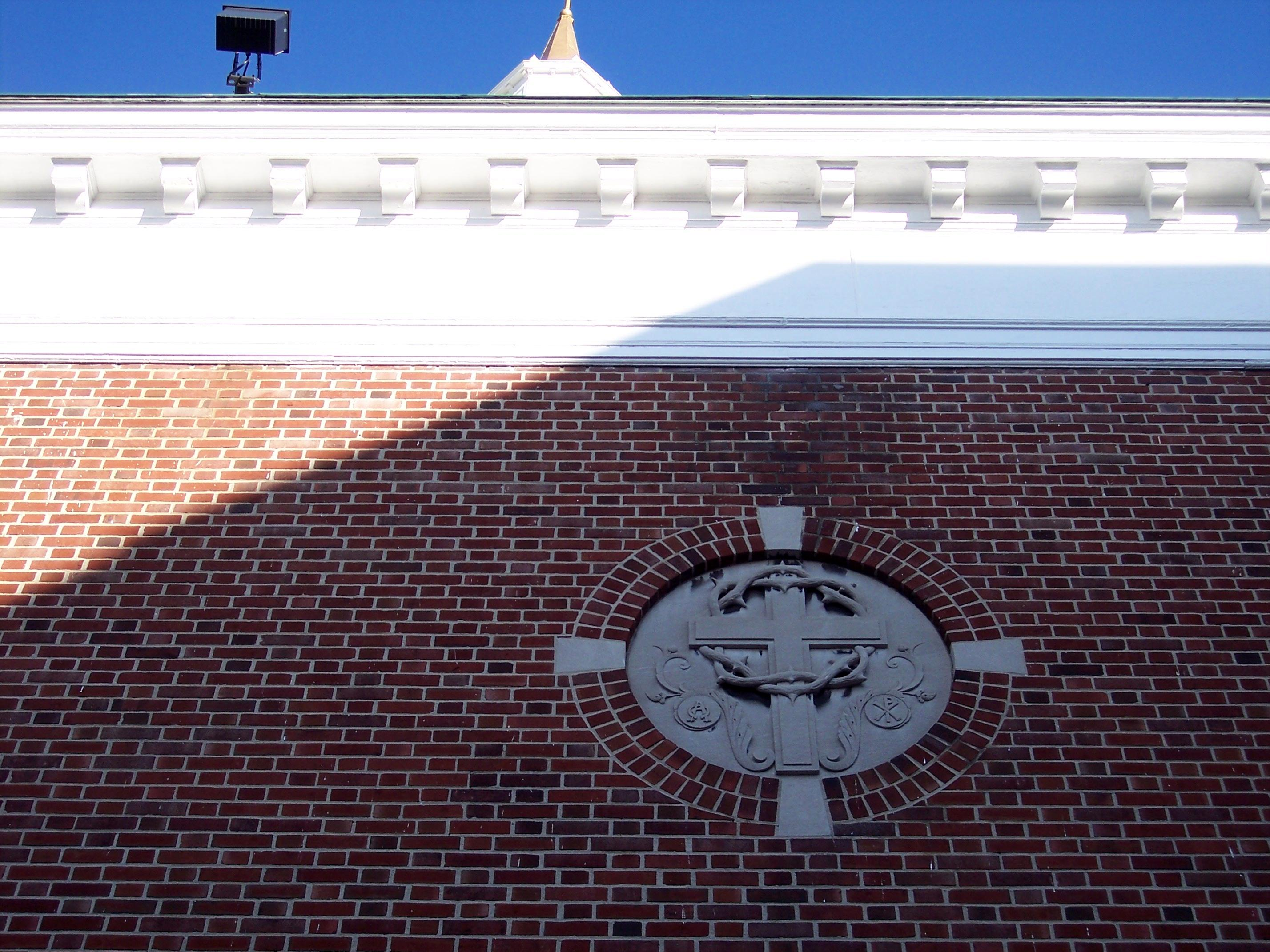

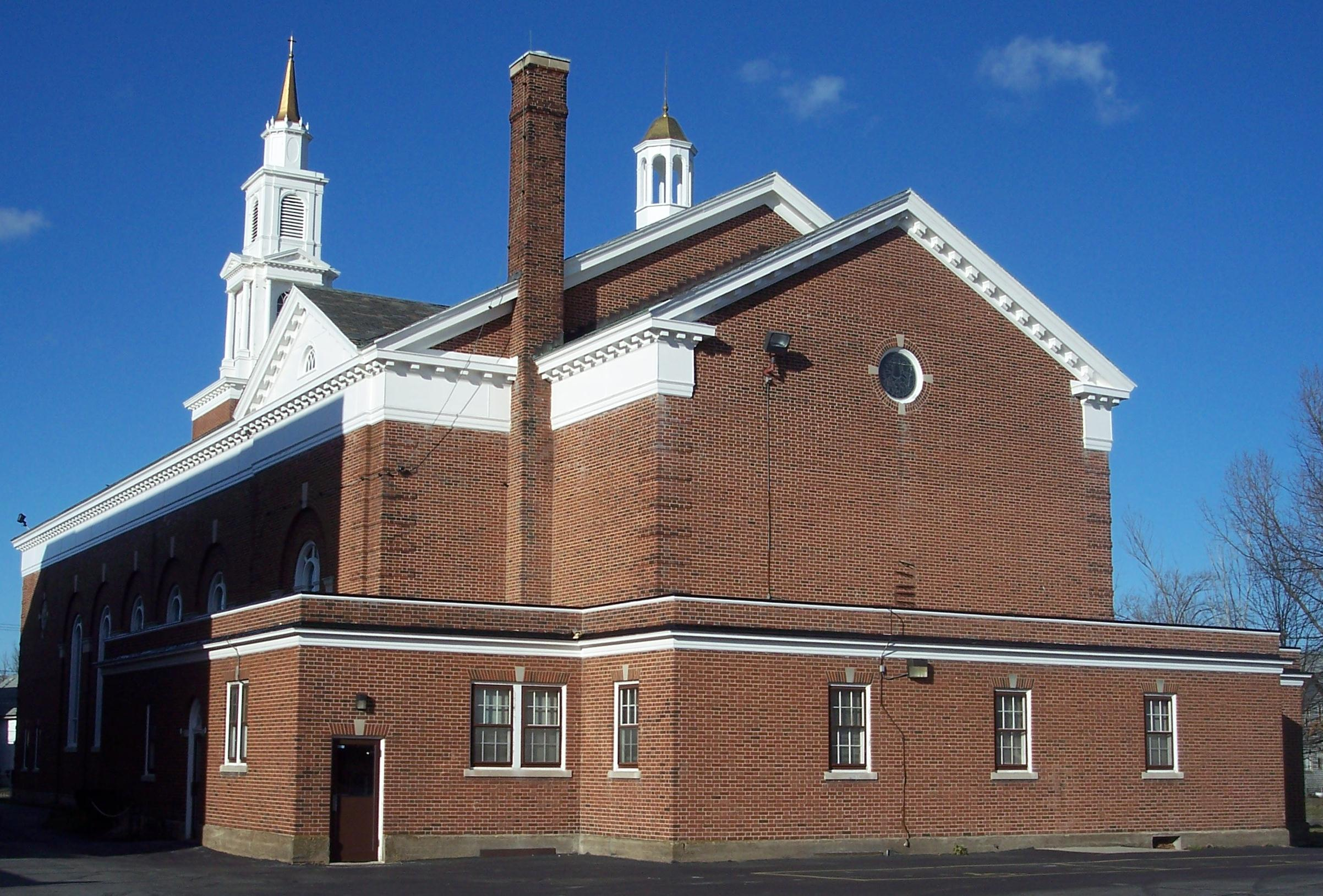
Rear of church

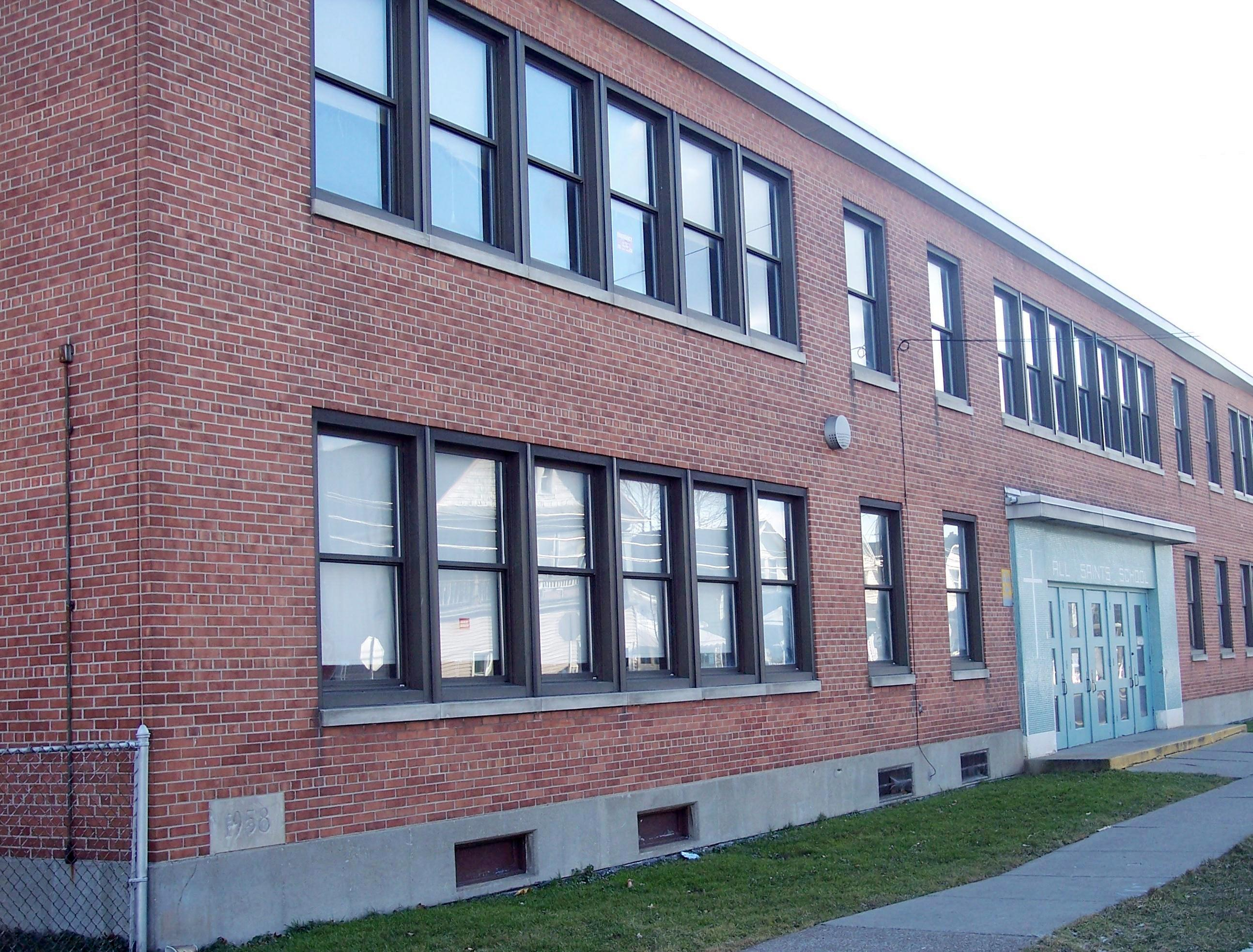
All Saints school (addition)
