= Tifft Nature Preserve =

Wildlife preserve in Buffalo, New York

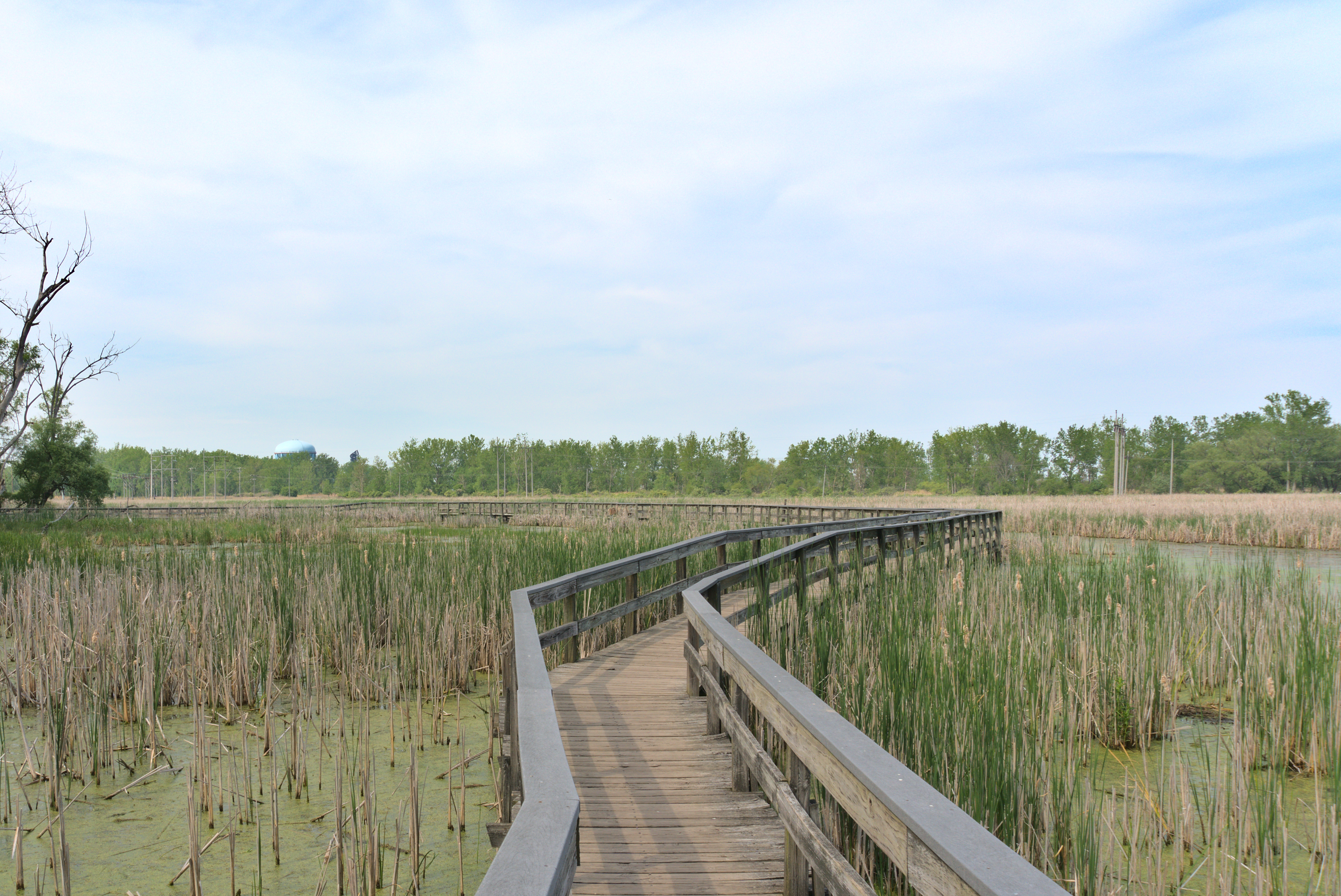
- The Heritage Boardwalk trail
- Interactive map of Tifft Nature Preserve
- Type: Urban wildlife preserve
- Location: Buffalo, New York
- Coordinates: 42°50′50″N 78°51′19″W
- Area: 264 acres (107 ha)
- Created: 1976
- Operator: Buffalo Museum of Science

The Tifft Nature Preserve is a 264-acre (107 ha) nature preserve in Buffalo, New York, and one of the largest municipal nature preserves in New York State.

== History ==
The land that is now the Tifft Nature Preserve was originally part of extensive Native American hunting and gathering grounds. By the 1700s it had come under the control of the Haudenosaunee Confederacy

The land was first deeded in 1845. George Washington Tifft purchased 600 acres in 1858, transforming it into a large dairy farm. The Tifft family held onto the land until 1883. By 1900 the site had become a trans-shipment center, primarily for coal and iron ore. It had twelve shipping lanes and docked 83 vessels. This ended with the 1912 Panama Canal Act, which forced the separation of all rail and shipping interests. During the 1950s and 1960s, the site had become an unofficial dump. The land was purchased in the 1970s by the City of Buffalo for use as a landfill. In 1973, 2,000,000 cubic yards of refuse was transferred from Unity Island and spread on the Tifft land.

Following public outcry, a city-supported not-for-profit organization was organized in 1976. A visitor center was completed in 1978. The not-for-profit was merged with the Buffalo Museum of Science in 1982. The preserve was temporarily closed in 1983 for removal of hazardous waste by the New York State Department of Environmental Conservation.

== Description ==
The preserve consists of 264 acres (107 ha) of restored habitat, including a cattail marsh. It is an important northeastern stopover for migratory raptor and waterfowl species. The preserve was designated as an Important Bird Area (IBA) by Audubon in 1998. Public access is provided by five miles of nature trails and three boardwalks with viewing blinds in, and adjacent to, the cattail marsh.

Popular outdoor recreational activities includes birdwatching, hiking, snowshoeing and cross-country skiing. The Herb and Jane Darling Education Center provides educational displays, restrooms, and indoor programming and event space. The parking lot and trails are open year-round from dawn to dusk.

== Gallery ==
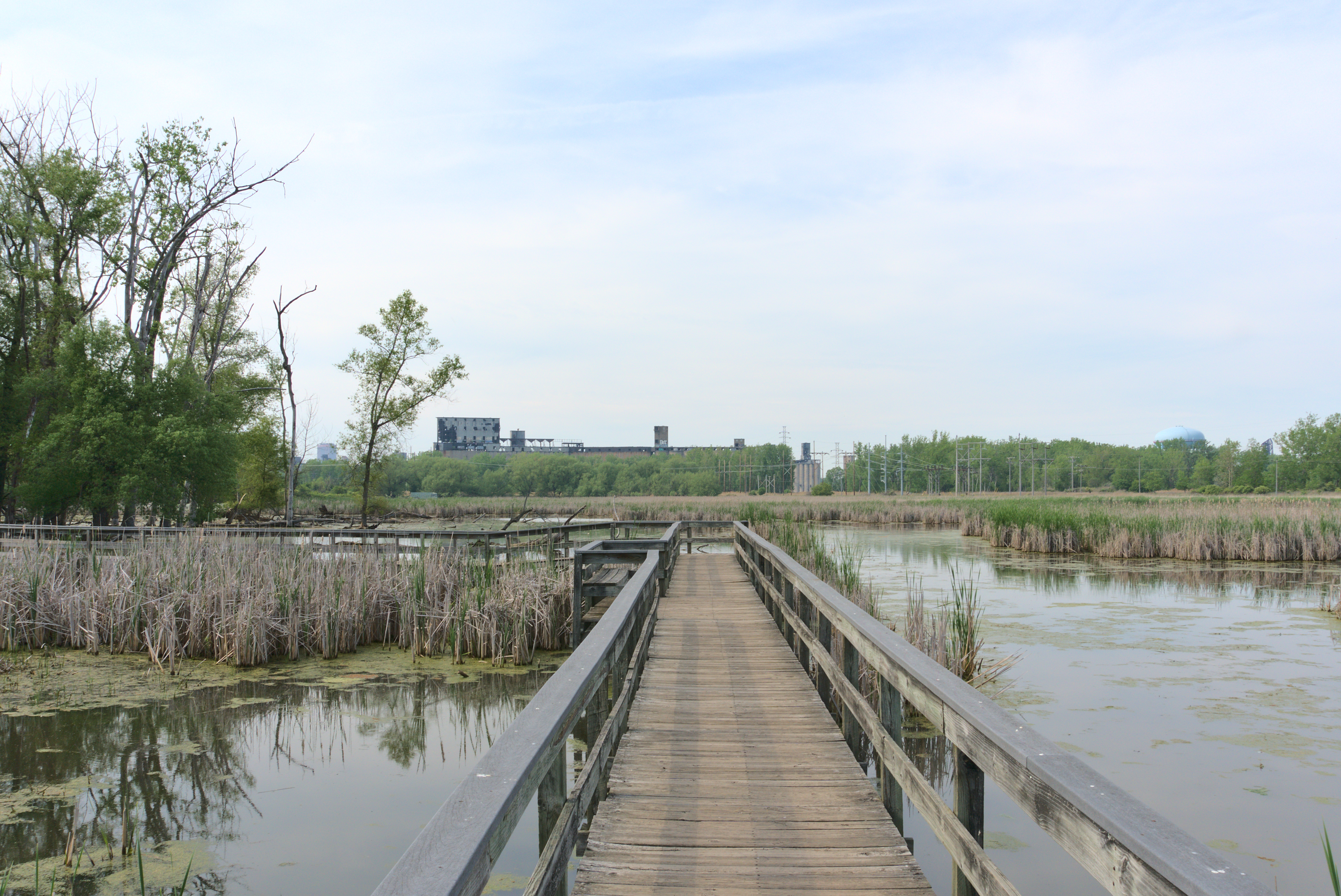
Cattail marshland facing north

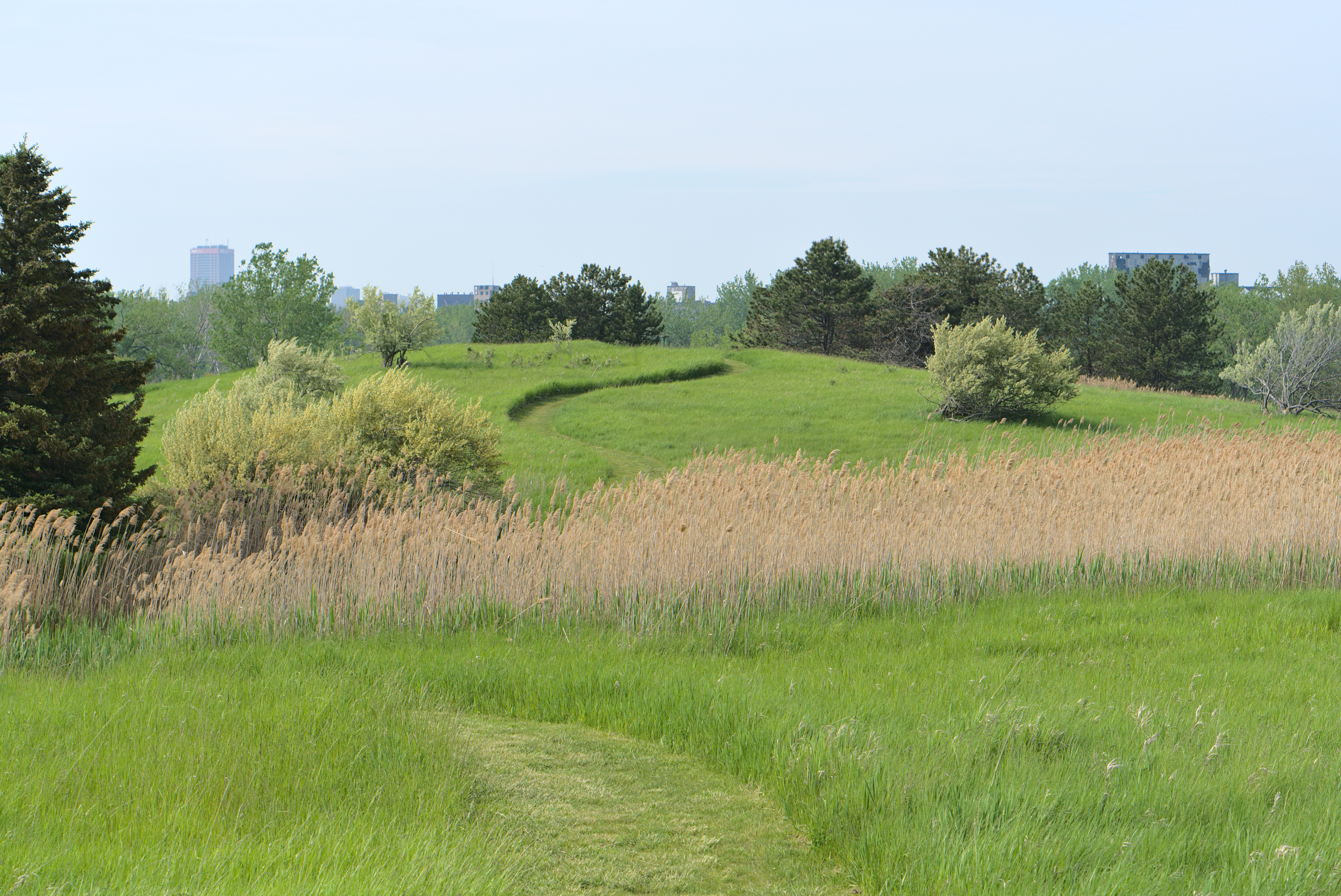
Grassland facing north, towards downtown Buffalo

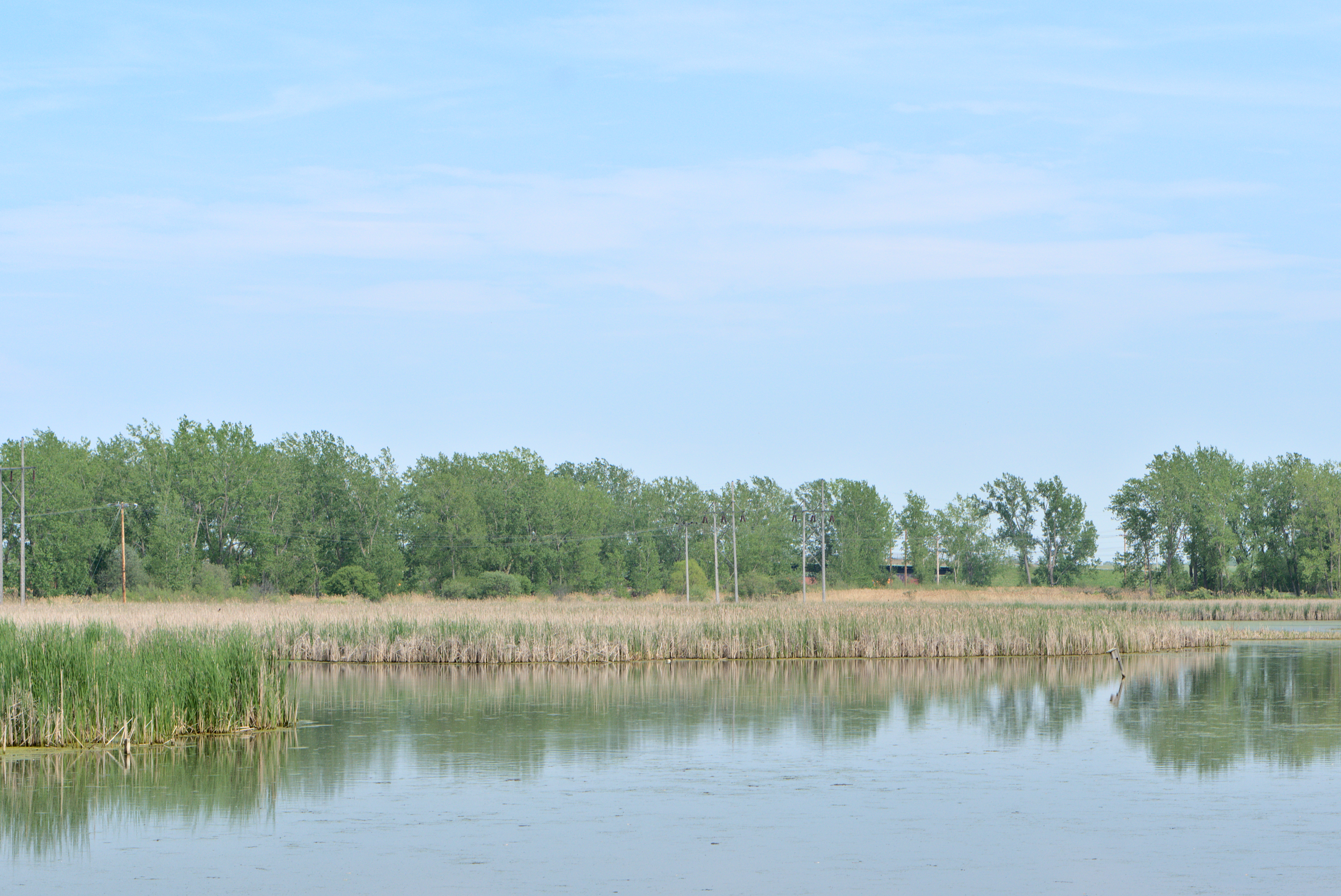
Cattail marshland facing south

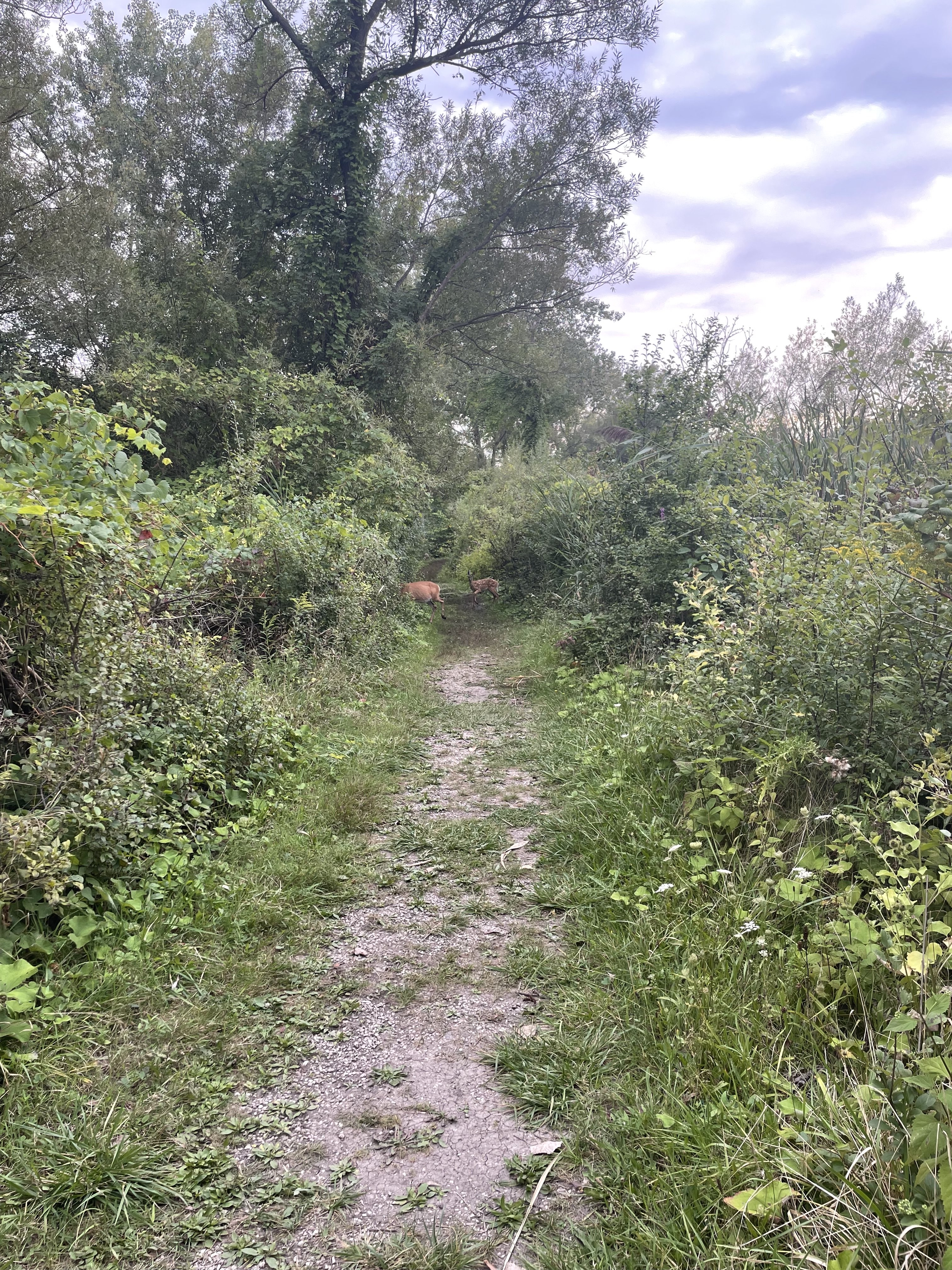
A trail in Tifft Nature Preserve
