= Public School No. 60 =

- U.S. National Register of Historic Places
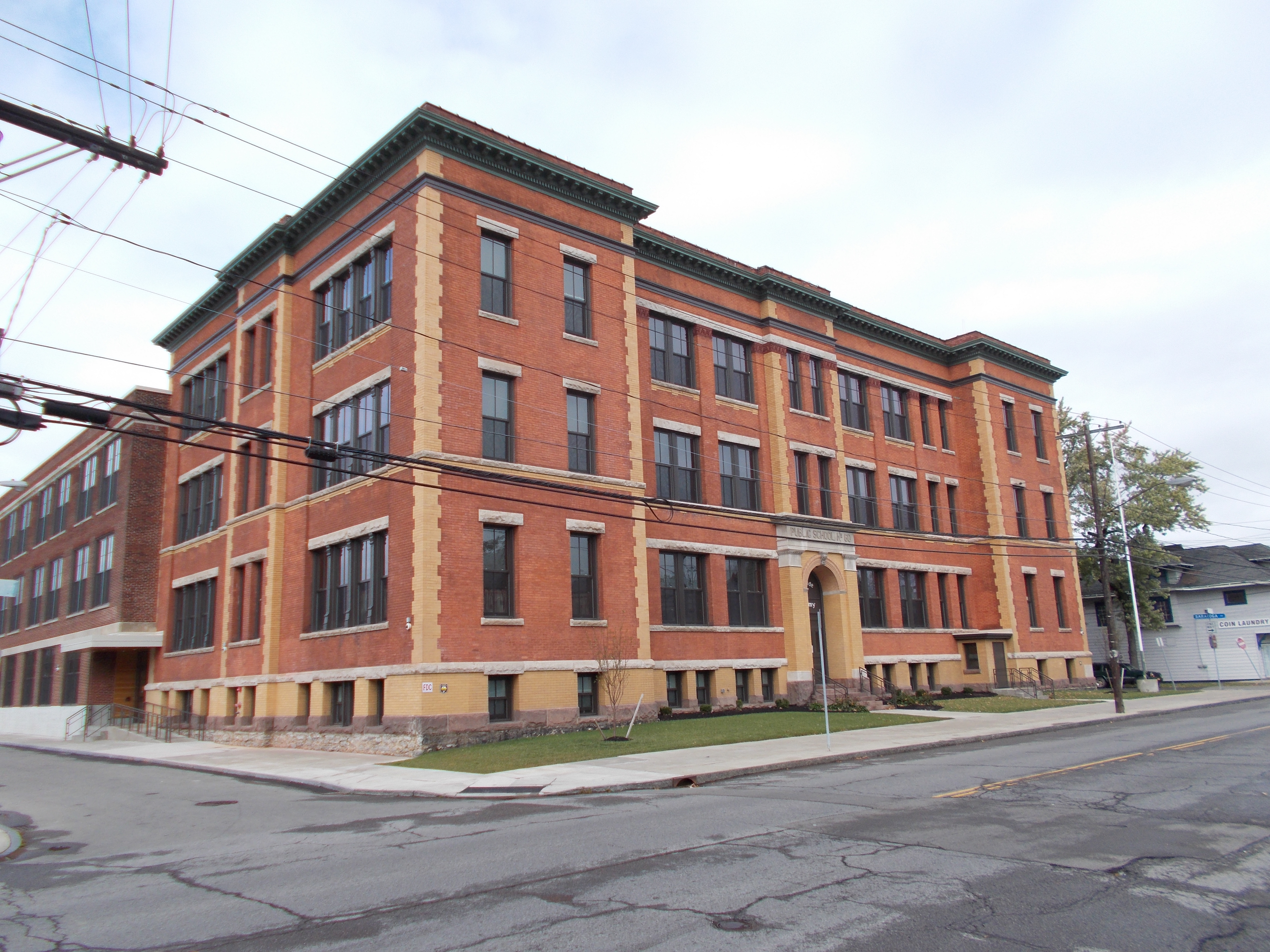
- Public School No. 60, October 2013

- Location within New York Location within the United States
- Location: 238 Ontario St., Buffalo, New York
- Coordinates: 42°57′04″N 78°54′12″W
- Area: 2.03 acres (0.82 ha)
- Built: 1897, 1922
- Built by: John W. Cowper Co.
- Architect: Carl Schmill; William B. Ittner & the Buffalo Assoc. Architects
- Architectural style: Renaissance
- NRHP reference No.: 14000489
- Added to NRHP: August 18, 2014

Public School No. 60, also known as Riverside Academy, is a historic school building located in the Riverside neighborhood of Buffalo, Erie County, New York. The original section was built in 1897, and is a three-story, 12 bay, "I"-plan red brick building with Renaissance Revival detailing. It sits on a raised basement and features polychrome, stepped façade, quoining, and classical entrances. A substantial three-story rear addition was built in 1922 and includes an auditorium. The building has been converted to accommodate 68 units of affordable housing.

It was listed on the National Register of Historic Places in 2014.
