= John F. Cowell =

John Francis Cowell (March 3, 1852 – May 1, 1915) was an American botanist. He was the first director of the Buffalo and Erie County Botanical Gardens. Cowell was born in Wrentham, Massachusetts and studied law in Boston.

Cowell practiced law in St. Paul, Minnesota and moved to Buffalo, New York in 1874. He was a school principal and professor of botany at the University at Buffalo before accepting the position of director of the botanical gardens in 1894.

He died of a heart attack while collecting plants in East Aurora, New York.

== References and external links ==
- Biographical material from the B&ECBG
