= Riverside Park (Buffalo, New York) =

- U.S. National Register of Historic Places
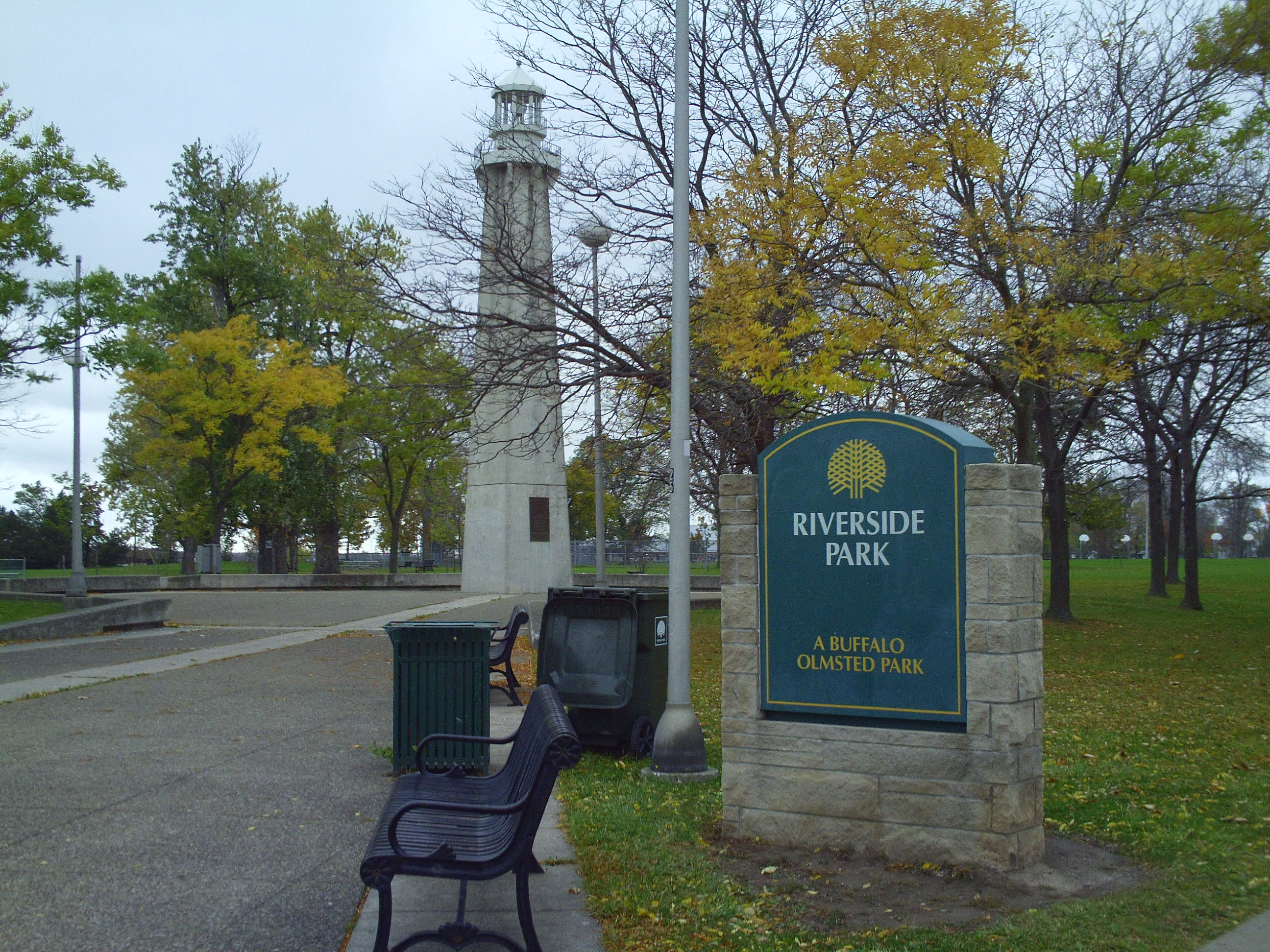
- Entrance to Riverside Park

- Location within New York Location within the United States
- Location: Roughly bounded by Vulcan, Tonawanda, Crowley, and Niagara St., Buffalo, New York
- Coordinates: 42°57′20″N 78°54′32″W
- Area: 21.9 acres (8.9 ha)
- Built: 1898
- Architect: Olmsted Bros.
- MPS: Olmsted Parks and Parkways TR
- NRHP reference No.: 82005026
- Added to NRHP: March 30, 1982

Riverside Park is a historic park located in the Riverside neighborhood in Buffalo, New York, United States. Located in northwest Buffalo, it is an individual park designed by the Olmsted Architectural Firm in 1898 after Frederick Law Olmsted's retirement. It is on a 22-acre (8.9 ha) site on a bluff overlooking the Niagara River. Riverside Park was designed for active recreation and periodic alterations have occurred as the community's recreation needs have changed. Despite the changes, the park retains numerous original design elements and remains as the final element completed as a part of the Olmsted plan for Buffalo's park system.

The park was listed on the National Register of Historic Places in 1982.

== Facilities and events ==
Some attractions include a playground, picnic areas, two public pools, tennis court, and a basketball court. The lighthouse facing Tonawanda street was recently relit after years of inoperation. The Bud Bakewell Arena, located on the Niagara Street side of the park directly facing the river, is an ice rink and lacrosse field, as well as home to youth hockey, Hasek's Heroes, and other sports affiliations. The park is also home to several baseball diamonds maintained by the River Rock Baseball League, a youth baseball and softball organization, and a fully renovated football field, home to the Black Rock Riverside Little League Football and Cheerleading organization. A winding road, Hotaling Drive, bisects the park at the edge of the football field. In July 2011, the park received additional grant funding for future development.

Riverside Parks hosted the annual Friendship Festival in the past along this road during the Independence Day holiday in conjunction with Fort Erie, Canada. In addition, the park hosts a seasonal farmer's market and other community events.

== See also ==
- Buffalo, New York parks system
