= Riverside, Buffalo =

Coordinates: 42°57′23″N 78°54′11″W

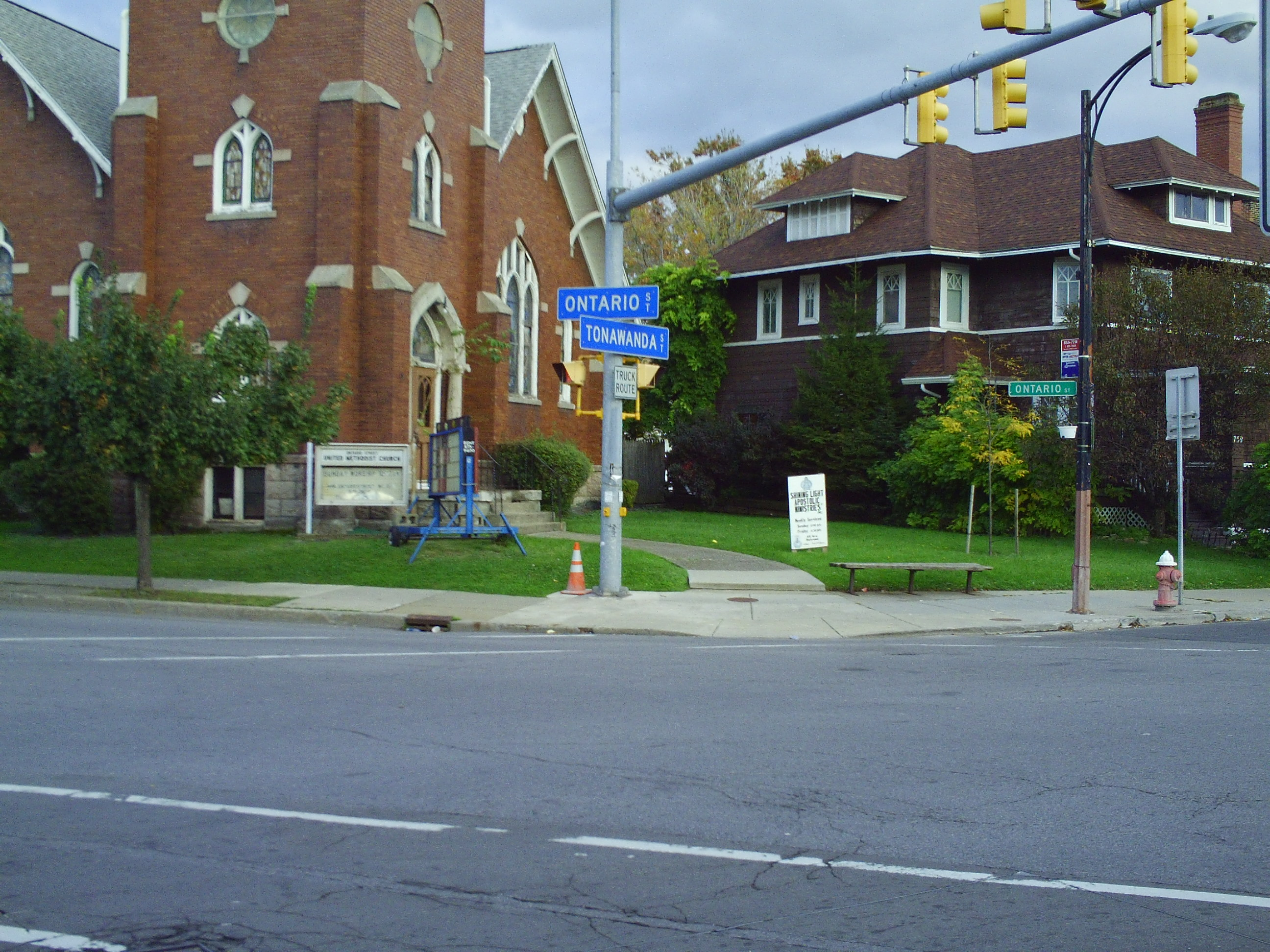
Intersection of Tonawanda and Ontario Streets. The Heart of Riverside

Riverside is a neighborhood of Buffalo, New York, located in the northwestern part of the city, along the Niagara River. It is sometimes referred to in conjunction with another community located directly south, Black Rock.

== History ==
=== Early years ===
Prior to the late 1800s, Riverside was an area that remained largely undeveloped farmland. For many, it was a "rural retreat" to the larger, more industrious city of Buffalo, inhabited mostly by a few wealthy owners of large estates. Riverside stayed this way until 1888, after the passage of the Hertel Avenue Sewer Bill, which allowed sewer construction to take place in the area. Subsequently, real estate development began in 1890 when the North Park Land Company purchased 30 acres (120,000 m^{2}) of land near the current Riverside Park (formerly known as Germania Park), which boasts a scenic outlook of the Niagara River. The land was subdivided, and construction of two-family homes started. All Saints Roman Catholic Church was founded in 1911, and can be found in the center of Riverside. In the 1930s Chevrolet constructed the GM Powertrain Tonawanda Engine Plant in Town of Tonawanda, a neighborhood bordering riverside, which helped bring about swift industrial growth. The remainder of the area continued to quickly develop through the 1950s.

Many of the new residents moving to Riverside, were arriving from Black Rock, which had become highly industrialized by the end of the 19th century. Offering views of the Niagara River, curving streets, and larger residential building lots than its neighbor to the south, Riverside had attracted over 2,000 people by 1900, who were mostly of German and Irish descents. It was this sudden surge in population, that gave Riverside its early reputation as a northern working class 'suburb' of Black Rock, even though it still was within the city limits. For these new residents, Riverside was only a short trolley-car ride away from their old neighborhoods.

Another wave of development took place after the close of the Pan-American Exposition in 1901. The Roblin Brothers used lumber from deconstructed buildings on the Exposition grounds to build hundreds of new homes around the areas surrounding the intersection of Ontario and Tonawanda Streets.

Around the time of the Great Depression and World War II, with the country in an economic slump, fewer people were moving out to the suburbs, so even more housing construction took place in Riverside as the remaining land was developed.

=== Decline ===
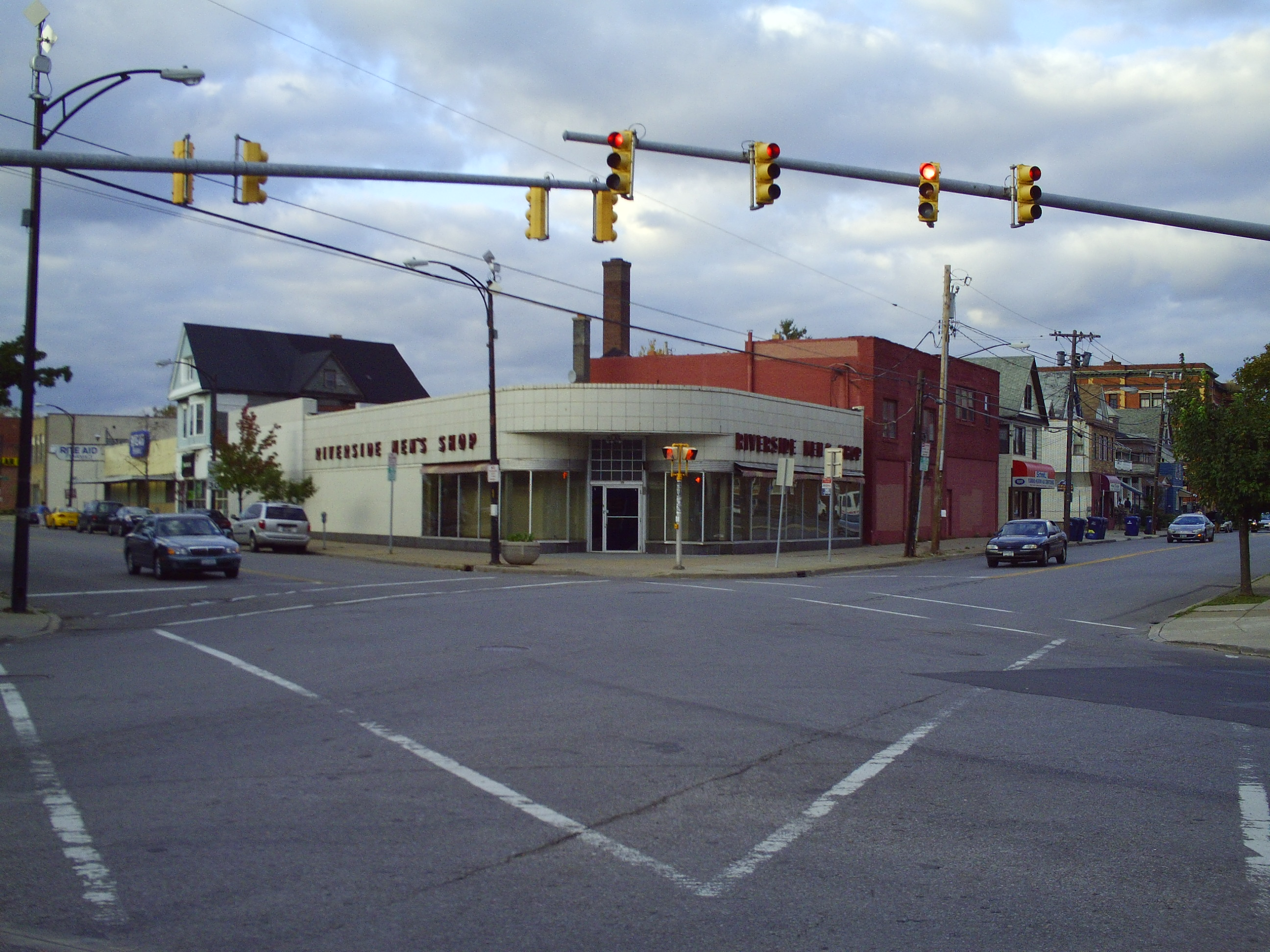
Previous location of the Riverside Men's Shop, now moved to Amherst, New York

But by the early 1950s, the construction of the Niagara extension of the New York State Thruway, effectively cut off all access to the Niagara River from neighborhood residents that once had existed at Riverside Park. This, coupled with the large-scale exodus of residents and businesses to the suburbs that was similarly taking place in many other parts of the country, began the long and steady period of decline in Riverside. However, the loss of population in Riverside did not have anything near the devastating impact that was demonstrated on many of the East Side neighborhoods.

== Geography ==
The neighborhood centers on the intersection of Tonawanda and Ontario Streets, which also serve as the two busiest streets in the community. Vulcan Street runs along the northern edge, which borders with the Town of Tonawanda. Riverside Park, designed by the firm of famed landscape designer Frederick Law Olmsted, is located to the west of the neighborhood, between Tonawanda and Niagara Streets.

== Demographics ==
As of the census of 2000, Riverside had a total population of 10,688. The City of Buffalo had a total population of 292,648.

At that time there were 10,688 people, 4,398 households, and 2,677 families residing in the community. There were 4,928 housing units. The racial makeup of Riverside was 88.94% White, 3.66% African American, 1.54% Native American, 0.65% Asian, 0.01% Pacific Islander, 2.96% from other races, and 2.25% from two or more races. 7.79% of the population were Hispanic or Latino of any race.

There were 4,398 households, out of which 34.92% had children under the age of 18 living with them, 35.72% were married couples living together, 19.28% had a female householder with no husband present, and 39.13% were non-families. 33.47% of all households were made up of individuals, and 12.26% had someone living alone who was 65 years of age or older. The average household size was about 2.4 and the average family size was about 3.1.

In the community, the population included 28.42% under the age of 18, 12.88% from 15 to 24, 30.12% from 25 to 44, 19.64% from 45 to 64, and 13.26% who were 65 years of age or older. The median age was approximately 34 years. For every 100 females there were 91.8 males. For every 100 females age 18 and over, there were 88.3 males.

Note: All figures based on the United States Census, 2000, Erie County, New York, Census Tracts 57 & 58

== Notable places and events ==
- Riverside Institute of Technology
- Riverside Park
- Flying Bison Brewing Company is located in Riverside- relocated to downtown
- The year 2011 marks the 7th annual Annual Black Rock & Riverside Tour of Gardens and the 5th annual Starry Night Garden Tour http://www.brrgardenwalk.com
- Public School No. 60

== See also ==
- Neighborhoods of Buffalo, New York
