= Cazenovia Park–South Park System =

- U.S. National Register of Historic Places
- New York State Register of Historic Places
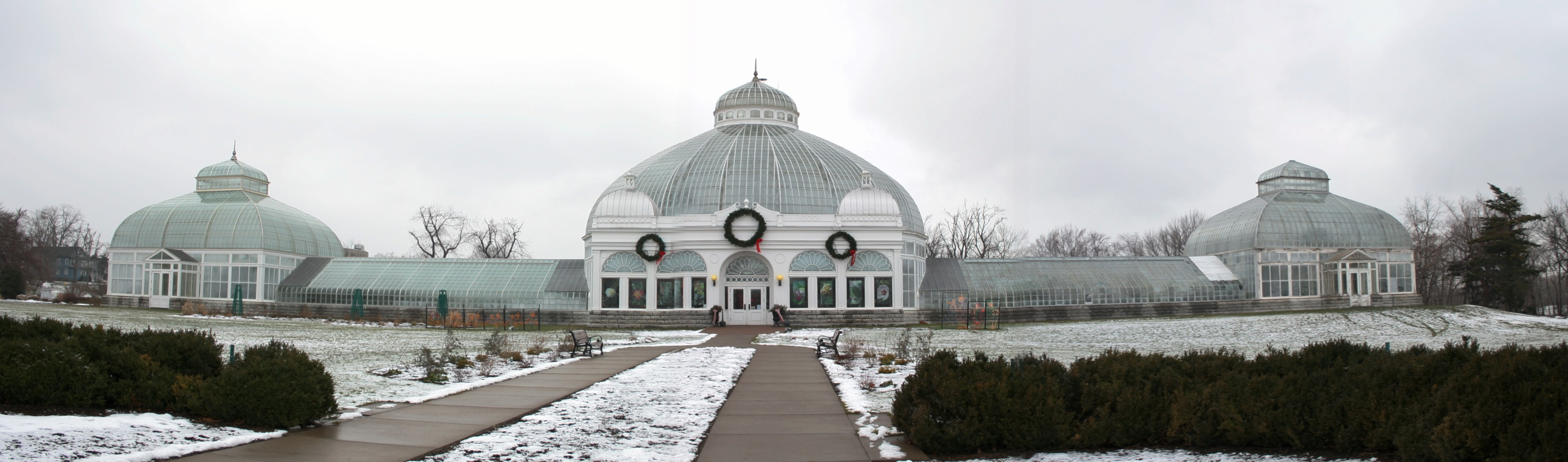
- Buffalo and Erie County Botanical Gardens, located within South Park

- Location within New York Location within the United States
- Location: South Park, NW along McKinley Pkwy. to Cazenovia Park, NW along McKinley Pkwy. to Heacock Park, Buffalo, New York
- Coordinates: 42°50′22″N 78°49′16″W
- Area: 366.1 acres (148.2 ha)
- Architect: Frederick Law Olmsted
- MPS: Olmsted Parks and Parkways TR
- NRHP reference No.: 82005028

Significant dates
- Added to NRHP: March 30, 1982
- Designated NYSRHP: December 10, 1981

Cazenovia Park–South Park System is a historic park system located in the South Buffalo neighborhood at Buffalo in Erie County, New York, United States. The interconnected set of parkways and parks was designed by Frederick Law Olmsted as part of his parks plan for the city of Buffalo, as inspired in large part by the parkland, boulevards, and squares of Paris, France.

== Components ==
The park system was listed on the National Register of Historic Places in 1982.

=== Heacock Place ===
A three-acre (1.2 ha) park site that forms the beginning of the Cazenovia Park–South Park System.

=== McKinley Parkway ===
Connects Heacock Place to South Park. Named for President William McKinley (formerly Southside Pkwy).

=== McClellan Circle ===
A 500-foot (150 m) right-of-way at the juncture of McKinley Parkway, Red Jacket Parkway, Choate Avenue, and Whitfield Avenue. Named for General George B. McClellan (formerly Woodside Circle).

=== Red Jacket Parkway ===
Connects McClellan Circle to Cazenovia Park. Named for Seneca orator Red Jacket.

=== Cazenovia Park ===
An irregularly shaped rectangular parkland plot bisected by Cazenovia Creek. The park features a branch of the Buffalo & Erie County Public Library, swimming pool, golf course, and baseball fields. Contributing structures are the Cazenovia Park Casino (1912) and Shelter House (1902).

=== McKinley Circle ===
Traversed by McKinley Parkway and Dorrance Avenue; connects McKinley Parkway to South Park (formerly South Parkway Circle).

=== South Park ===
An irregularly shaped square parkland plot of 155 acres (63 ha). The main entrance is at the intersection of McKinley Parkway and South Park Avenue. The park is home to the Buffalo and Erie County Botanical Gardens. Recreational development of the park began in 1915 with the golf course. Contributing structures are the South Park Botanical Gardens Conservatory (1889, rebuilt 1930) and Golf Shelter (ca. 1927).

== See also ==
- Buffalo, New York parks system
- Delaware Park–Front Park System
