= Saul Elkin =

American actor and director (1932–2025)

Elkin acting in Shakespeare in Delaware Park

Saul Elkin (April 8, 1932 – July 14, 2025) was an American actor and director based in Buffalo, New York. He was the founder and artistic director of Shakespeare in Delaware Park, and a former chair of the University at Buffalo's Theatre Department.

== Biography ==
Born on April 8, 1932, to Jewish immigrant parents from Russia and Romania, Elkin spoke both Yiddish and English growing up in New York City. He began his acting education in a small children's theater school for Jewish children. His first show was at the age of seven, cast as the lead in a play by the founder of the Yiddish Art Theatre, Maurice Schwartz.

Elkin continued to work as both an actor and director for the stage as well as television as he grew up in New York. His acting and directing credits include over 250 Broadway performances (off and on), film, “The Edge of Night” (a soap opera in which he played a doctor), and several regional and seasonal theater companies. He held a B.A. and an M.F.A from Columbia, and a Ph.D from Carnegie Mellon University.

Elkin came to Buffalo, New York in 1969 and began teaching theater at the University at Buffalo, where he soon became chairman of the Theater Department serving from 1976 until 1985, again from 1988 to 1991, and once more as Interim Chair in 2004, remaining as Distinguished Service Professor Emeritus. In 1976, Elkin founded Shakespeare in Delaware Park, finding the initial funding for electricity from the Mayor of the city, Stanley Makowski and further funding from the University at Buffalo’s Theater Department.

Elkin was married to Janine Piret and had four children: two sons from his first marriage to Sandra Marotti and two daughters from his marriage to Janine. His son, Todd is an artist and arts integration curriculum development specialist. His second son Evan is a psychologist who is the Director of the Department of Planning and Government Innovation at the Vera Institute of Justice. His daughter Rebecca is a drama therapist and actress who appeared in some productions of Shakespeare in Delaware Park alongside her father, such as the 2008 production of King Lear, where they played King Lear and Cordelia respectively. His second daughter Emily is a classical and rock and roll cellist. Elkin continued to work as a professor at the University at Buffalo in Theater Department, as well as continuing to act and direct performances in both Shakespeare in Delaware Park, The Jewish Repertory Theatre, and several theater companies throughout the Buffalo area.

In 2003, Elkin co-founded the Jewish Repertory Theatre with David Bunis and was the artistic director of the company as of 2025.

In 2008, he was working on the film production called Nicholas of Myra: The Story of Saint Nicholas. The film is based on the life and history of Saint Nicholas.

Elkin suffered a stroke in November 2024. He died on July 14, 2025, at the age of 93.

A celebration of life for Elkin was celebrated at Shea's Performing Arts Center on August 4, 2025. A livestream from Shakespeare in Delaware park is posted on YouTube at https://www.youtube.com/watch?v=-WB1RBBb-Q8.

== Honors ==
Elkin received several different recognitions such as the “Chancellor’s Award for Excellence in Teaching”, “Distinguished Service Professor”, and in 1998 he was given the “Outstanding Individual Artist of the Year Award” for his performances in several theater companies in the Buffalo area, as well as for his continued work and direction with Shakespeare in Delaware Park.
