= Shakespeare in Delaware Park =

Theater festival in Buffalo, New York

Shakespeare in Delaware Park is one of the largest free outdoor Shakespeare festivals in the country which takes place during summer months in Delaware Park located in the city of Buffalo, New York. The festival attracts about 40,000 audience members each year.

Productions are performed for the public at no cost in Buffalo's Delaware Park, designed by Frederick Law Olmsted. Over 76 productions have been mounted in the 44 years that Shakespeare in Delaware Park has been running, with plays ranging from tragedies such as Romeo and Juliet, comedies like The Taming of the Shrew, and histories such as Henry IV (parts 1 and 2). The majority of actors come from the Buffalo area, and performances run Tuesday through Sunday from June through August, with dates varying each year. The shows are always performed in the evening, beginning at 7:15pm.

Shakespeare in Delaware Park is a not-for-profit, professional theatre company.

== History ==
Shakespeare in Delaware Park was first founded in 1976 by Saul Elkin, as a part of the University at Buffalo's theater department.

Elkin began the project for Shakespeare in Delaware Park by asking the Mayor of the city of Buffalo to help in developing a free Shakespeare theater festival to resemble the New York Shakespeare Festival. Mayor Stanley Makowski gave permission for the performances to take place in Delaware Park, as well as pledge to fund the electricity costs for all performances (a pledge honored to this day).

Shakespeare in Delaware Park's previous Tudor style stage was first built and designed by Gary Casarella (technical director for the University at Buffalo's Theatre department), and was constructed at the University at Buffalo with funding from the school's dean. After the construction of the stage it was marked, taken apart, and transported to Delaware Park, where it was reconstructed at the base of what is now known as "Shakespeare Hill", during the 1993 season, in time for that year's production of Romeo and Juliet. That season's first production used a temporary stage, and prior seasons used other stages. The seating has always been the hill itself, and audience members watch the productions on blankets, lawn chairs, and other self-provided seating.

In 1991, Shakespeare in Delaware Park became a fully independent non-profit organization whose only funding comes from donations made by the public, audience members, the City of Buffalo, Erie County, and outside entities such as M&T Bank, the local NBC affiliate WGRZ-TV, the New York State Council on the Arts (NYSCA) and The Buffalo News.

The 2020 and 2021 seasons were not held in a traditional manner, due to the COVID-19 pandemic, but the company produced three touring shows ("Shakespeare's Greatest Hits: The Best of the Bard" in 2020, and "Shakespeare & Love" and "A Midsummer Night's Walk" in 2021).They were outdoor, free, touring shows for which special spacing and safety regulations were in effect and reservations were required.

== Educational Activities ==
The majority of roles for the productions in Shakespeare in Delaware Park are done through an audition process held at the Shakespeare in Delaware Park's offices, before the summer season. Most actors are from the local area of Buffalo, NY and are hired seasonally, with the exception of a small troupe members who work year long with the company, performing in high schools throughout the Buffalo area.

Previous education productions include "Et Tu, Shakespeare?", "Where There's a Will, There's a Play!" written by the troupe members, and are hour long shows they perform for high school students that teaches parts of Shakespeare's life, times, and Theater, by incorporating different parts of Shakespeare's work such as his plays; "Comedy of Errors", "Midsummer Night's Dream", and "Hamlet", and some of his sonnets. The actors will then stay after the performance to answer questions students might have about Shakespeare and his work. This small troupe of actors also provide workshops for students where they can work alongside the actors to learn different elements such as; iambic pentameter, sound, meaning, and image, and can arrange these workshops to work around a specific Shakespearean play students may be working on.

The company also offers an intense 6 day workshop that includes the performance of "Where There's a Will, There's a Play", the three-day workshop, and a joint performance that includes both students and troupe members from Shakespeare in Delaware Park.

== Staff/Board of Directors ==
=== Staff ===
- Saul Elkin: Founder/Artistic Director
- Lisa Ludwig: Managing Director
- Sean Crawford: Office Manager/Executive Assistant
- Grace Aroune: Education & Community Outreach Associate

=== Board of directors ===
- Kristin M. Anderson: President
- Allison Joseph: Vice-President
- Philip G. Zuccaro: Treasurer
- Rosa Alina Pizzi: Secretary
- Deborah Di Matteo
- Elaine Greco
- William K. Kennedy
- Anne K. Kyzmir
- Nathaniel W. Lucek
- Robert Maefs
- Biagio Patti
- Emily Scioli
- Norman J. Sfeir

== Productions ==
1976

- The Winter's Tale

1977

- Hamlet
- As You Like It

1978

- The Tempest
- The Merry Wives of Windsor

1979

- The Comedy of Errors
- Much Ado About Nothing

1980

- A Midsummer Night's Dream
- Richard II

1981

- Macbeth
- Twelfth Night

1982

- The Taming of the Shrew
- Henry IV, Part 1

1983

- King Lear
- Americles (an experimental adaptation of Pericles)
- Richard III

1984

- Hamlet
- Measure for Measure
- Two Gentlemen of Verona

1985

- Romeo & Juliet
- The Tempest
- Twelfth Night

1986

- Love's Labour's Lost
- The Merchant of Venice

1987

- Henry V
- All's Well That Ends Well

1988

- The Winter's Tale
- Julius Caesar

1989

- King Lear
- Much Ado About Nothing

1990

- The Merry Wives of Windsor
- Othello

1991

- Henry IV, Part 1
- As You Like It

1992

- The Comedy of Errors
- Richard III

1993

- A Midsummer Night's Dream
- Romeo & Juliet

1994

- Macbeth
- The Taming of the Shrew

1995

- Love's Labour's Lost
- Hamlet
- King Lear (indoors at the Pfeiffer Theatre)

1996

- The Merchant of Venice
- Twelfth Night
- Murder in the Cathedral (indoors at St. Andrews Episcopal Church)

1997

- Much Ado About Nothing
- Richard II

1998

- The Merry Wives of Windsor
- The Tempest

1999

- Henry IV, Part 2
- Measure for Measure

2000

- Hamlet (indoors at the Pfeiffer Theatre)
- The Winter's Tale
- As You Like It
- The Dresser (indoors at the Pfeiffer Theatre)

2001

- Romeo & Juliet
- Julius Caesar

2002

- Macbeth
- The Comedy of Errors

2003

- A Midsummer Night's Dream
- Much Ado About Nothing

2004

- Henry IV, Part 1
- The Taming of the Shrew

2005

- Romeo & Juliet
- Hamlet

2006

- Love's Labour's Lost
- Twelfth Night

2007

- All's Well That Ends Well
- Othello

2008

- The Merry Wives of Windsor
- King Lear

2009

- The Tempest
- Julius Caesar

2010

- Much Ado About Nothing
- Macbeth (all female cast)

2011

- The Merchant of Venice
- As You Like It

2012

- Richard III
- A Midsummer Night's Dream

2013

- Hamlet
- Measure for Measure

2014

- Henry V
- The Comedy of Errors

2015

- Romeo and Juliet
- Twelfth Night

2016

- The Winter's Tale
- The Taming of the Shrew

2017

- The Merry Wives of Windsor
- Macbeth

2018

- King Lear
- Much Ado About Nothing

2019

- The Tempest
- Love's Labour's Lost

2022

- As You Like It
- A Midsummer Night's Dream

2023

- Measure for Measure
- Romeo and Juliet

2024

- The Winter's Tale
- The Comedy of Errors

2025

- Twelfth Night
- Richard III

2026

- Pericles, Prince of Tyre
- The Taming of the Shrew

== See also ==
- Shakespeare in the Park
- New York Shakespeare Festival
- Kentucky Shakespeare Festival
