= Buffalo and Erie County Botanical Gardens =

Botanical gardens in Buffalo, New York

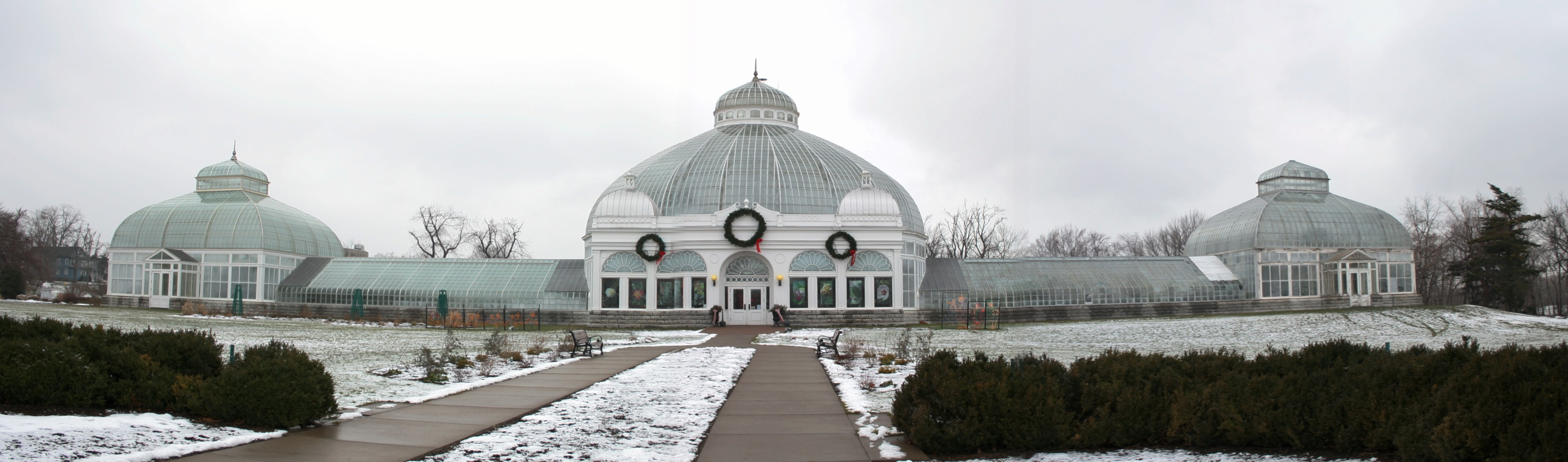
- Interactive map of Buffalo and Erie County Botanical Gardens
- Type: Botanical garden
- Location: 2655 South Park Avenue; Buffalo, New York
- Nearest city: Buffalo, New York
- Coordinates: 42°49′41″N 78°49′33″W
- Area: 11.57 acres (0.0468 km^{2})
- Created: 1900
- Operator: Erie County Department of Parks, Recreation and Forestry; The Buffalo and Erie County Botanical Gardens Society, Inc.
- Open: All year
- Website: Official website

The Buffalo and Erie County Botanical Gardens are botanical gardens located within South Park in Buffalo, New York, United States. These gardens are the product of landscaping architect Frederick Law Olmsted, glass-house architects Lord & Burnham, and botanist and plant-explorer John F. Cowell.

== History ==
The idea of the Gardens first began in 1868 when the Buffalo Parks Commission started meeting with landscape architect Fredrick Law Olmsted, Sr., and Partners. In the late 1880s, they asked Olmsted to design a new park for South Buffalo; the eventual design included two new parks: Cazenovia Park and South Park, which was created in 1894-1900 from 156 acres (0.63 km^{2}) of farm land.

South Park eventually came to house today's botanical gardens, originally known as the "South Park Conservatory". In Olmsted's design, the conservatory would showcase tropical plant species, while the rest of the park was designed to feature hardy species including an arboretum, pinetum, shrub garden, and a bog garden. Formal gardens around the conservatory led visitors into informal park along walking paths. South Park also was to include a large pond for boating, a ring road for horse carriages, and a meadow. However, the proposed walking paths, boat house, and bandstand were never completed.

The conservatory's tri-domed glass, wood and steel building was designed by Lord & Burnham, who were among the premier conservatory designers of the time. Construction methods were based upon the famous Crystal Palace and Kew Gardens Palm House in England. When built in 1897-1899, it was one of the largest public greenhouses in the country (at a cost of $130,000). Today there are fewer than a dozen large Victorian conservatories in America. This is one of only two with a tri-dome design (the New York Botanical Garden is the other).

The first director, Professor John F. Cowell, oversaw the growing of plants for the park and personally located and obtained unusual tree specimens. He spent decades exploring the Americas and the Caribbean, sending back seeds and small plants for the conservatory. Shortly after it opened, thousands of visitors to the 1901 Pan-American Exposition visited South Park's conservatory and gardens, which thus quickly gathered national renown.

== See also ==
- List of botanical gardens in the United States
