= Delaware Park–Front Park System =

Park system in Buffalo, New York

- U.S. National Register of Historic Places
- U.S. Historic district
- New York State Register of Historic Places
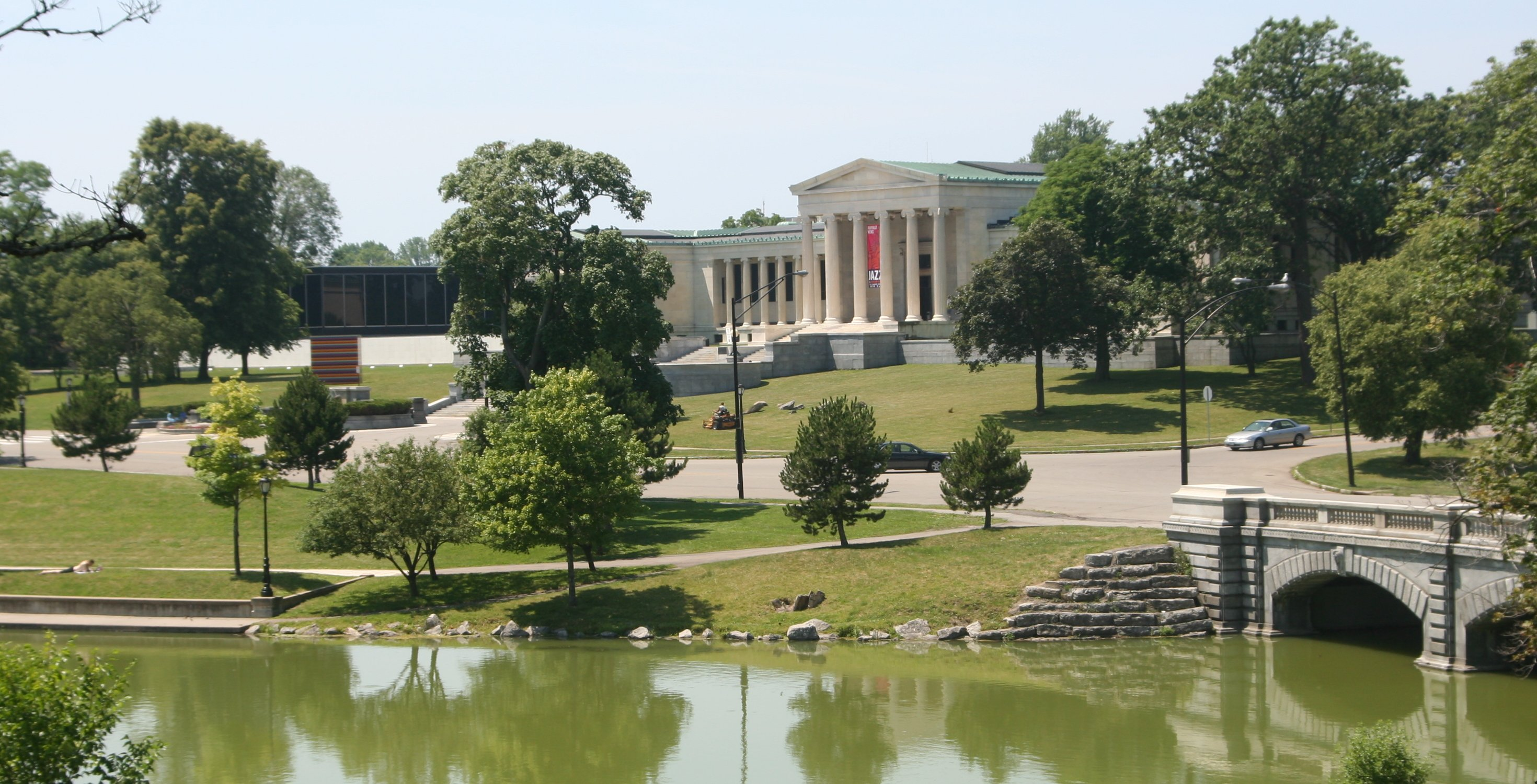
- Hoyt Lake in Delaware Park, with the Albright-Knox Art Gallery

- Location within New York Location within the United States
- Location: Front Park, Porter Ave. to Symphony Cir., N along Richmond Ave., Bidwell Pkwy., Gates Cir. and Delaware Park, Buffalo, New York
- Coordinates: 42°55′54.8″N 78°51′36.1″W
- Area: 505.9 acres (204.7 ha)
- Architects: Olmsted, Frederick Law; Vaux, Calvert
- MPS: Olmsted Parks and Parkways TR
- NRHP reference No.: 82005029

Significant dates
- Added to NRHP: March 30, 1982
- Designated NYSRHP: December 10, 1981

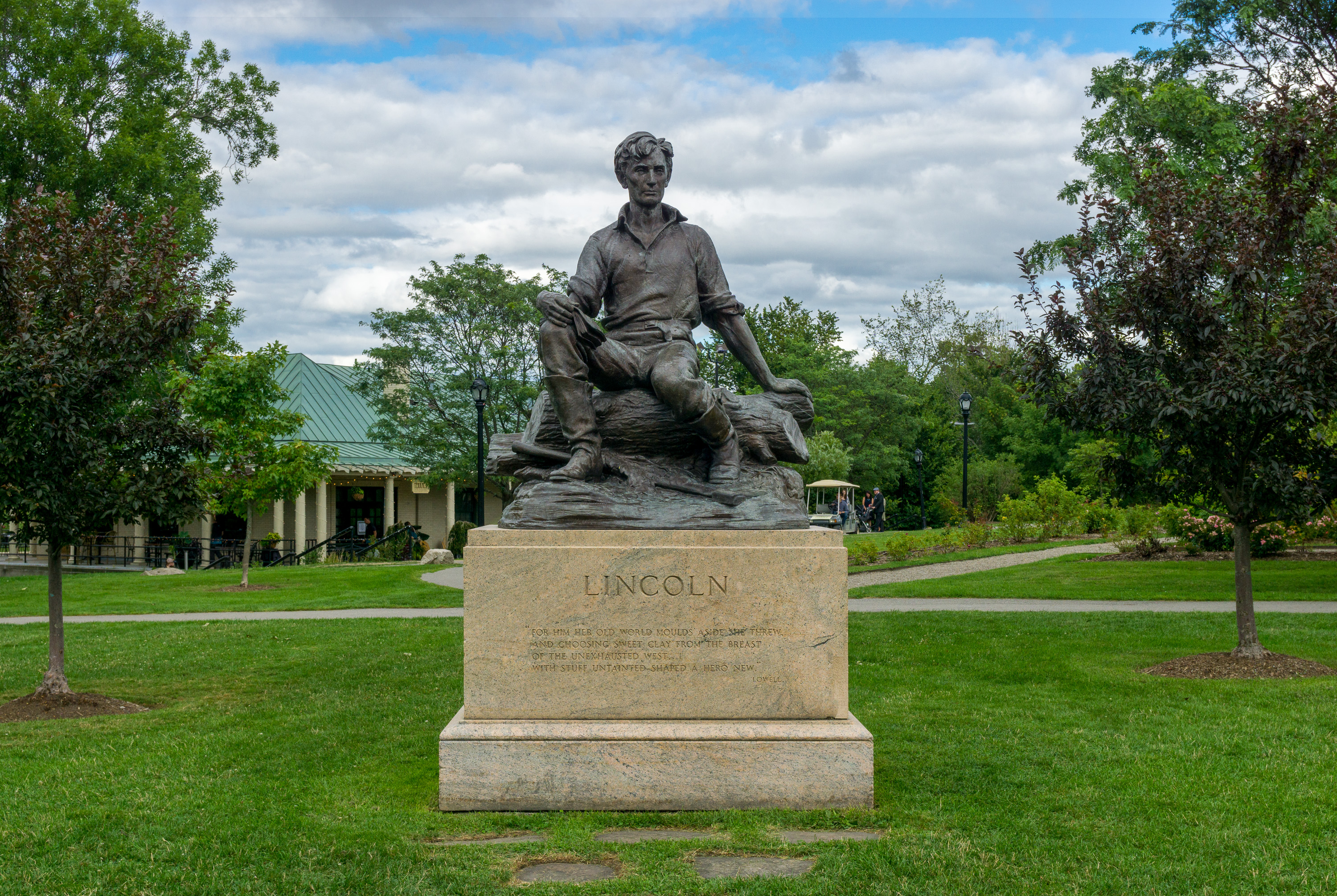
Abraham Lincoln as a Boy by Bryant Baker, Delaware Park (1935)

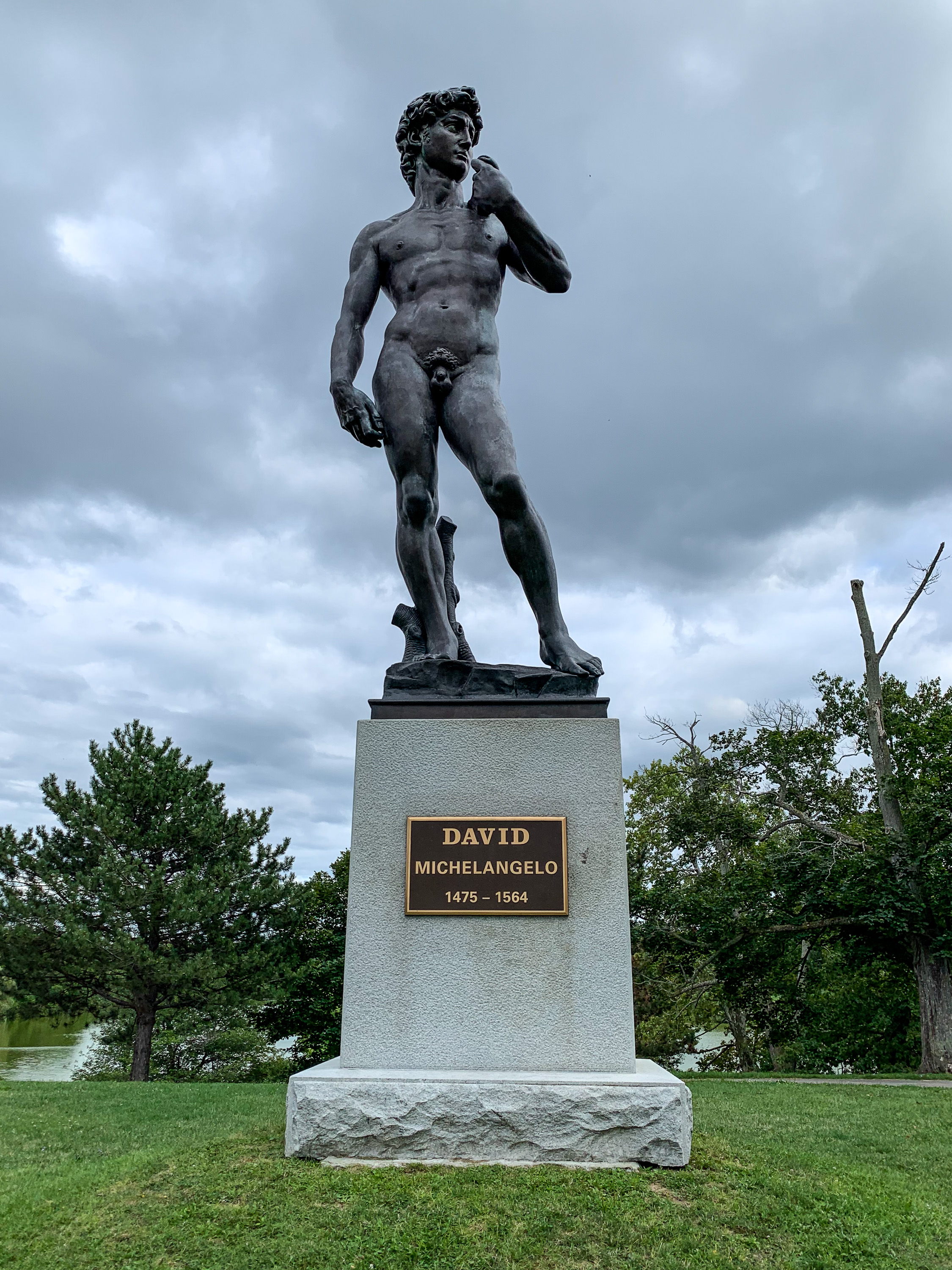
Statue of David in Delaware Park

Delaware Park–Front Park System is a historic park system and national historic district in the northern and western sections of Buffalo in Erie County, New York. The park system was designed by Frederick Law Olmsted and Calvert Vaux and developed between 1868 and 1876.

The park system was listed on the National Register of Historic Places in 1982.

== Components ==
The Delaware Park–Front Park System encompasses the following parts:

=== Delaware Park ===
The centerpiece of the Buffalo, New York, parks system and located in the North Buffalo neighborhood. The 376-acre (152 ha) park was named simply The Park by Olmsted; it was later renamed Delaware Park, because of its proximity to Delaware Avenue, Buffalo's mansion row. It is divided into two areas: the 243-acre (98 ha) "Meadow Park" on the east, and the 133-acre (54 ha) "Water Park", with what was originally a 43-acre (17 ha) lake, on the west. The 12-acre (4.9 ha) ravine and picnic grove on the south side of the lake comprise a subdivision of the latter. Olmsted dammed Scajaquada Creek to create the lake, originally called Gala Water, then Delaware Park Lake, and now known as Hoyt Lake. The lake was a feature during the Pan-American Exposition. The Scajaquada Expressway bisects the park west to east.

The Albright-Knox Art Gallery occupies the park's western edge, overlooking Hoyt Lake, and the Buffalo History Museum is situated on its northern edge, overlooking Scajaquada Creek. The park is home to Shakespeare in Delaware Park, a summer tradition since the mid-1970s, and the second largest free outdoor Shakespeare festival in the United States (after New York City's). It is also the location of the Buffalo Zoo on the east side of Meadow Park. The park has a golf course, two baseball diamonds, a softball diamond, cross country running, tennis courts, and soccer fields.

Contributing structures are: Caretakers Cottage (1889), Lincoln Parkway Bridge (1900), designed by Green and Wicks, Rose Garden Pergola (1912), Stone Bridge (c. 1887), the only remaining structure from the original Olmsted plan, Parkside Lodge (1914), Rumsey Shelter (1900), Main Zoo Building (1935–1940), Shelter House (c. 1900), and Elephant House (c. 1912). Located north of the park are the Parkside East Historic District and Parkside West Historic District, and to the south are the Elmwood Historic District–East and Elmwood Historic District–West, all listed on the National Register of Historic Places.

==== Statue of David ====
The park is home to an exact replica of Michelangelo's David. It is 18 feet tall and weighs 3000 pounds. The statue was dedicated in 1903, one of only three bronze replicas made of the original sculpture. At one time it included a fig leaf, which was not present in the original; this was later removed so David can be viewed in all his glory. When the statue was rededicated in 2013, it was given a new plaque which corrected the spelling of the artist's name from Michael Angelo to Michelangelo.

=== Gates Circle ===
Originally Chapin Place, a 5-acre (2.0 ha) plot measuring 500 by 420 feet (150 by 130 m) at the intersection of Delaware Avenue, Lafayette Avenue, and Chapin Parkway. The circle's center contains a monumental sunken fountain constructed in 1904.

=== Chapin Parkway ===
Connects Gates Circle and Soldier's Place; 1,904 feet (580 m) in length.

=== Soldier's Place ===
Consists of an 8.8-acre (3.6 ha) area 700 feet (210 m) in diameter at the juncture of Bidwell Parkway, Lincoln Parkway, Bird Avenue, and Chapin Parkway. Frank Lloyd Wright's William R. Heath House (1904) overlooks the circle at Bird Avenue.

=== Lincoln Parkway ===
A 200-foot-wide (61 m), 9-acre (3.6 ha) thoroughfare, connecting Soldier's Place to Delaware Park; 1,965 feet (599 m) in length.

=== Bidwell Parkway ===
A 200-foot-wide (61 m), 10.7-acre (4.3 ha) thoroughfare, connecting Colonial Circle to Soldier's Place; 2,323 feet (708 m) in length. At its intersection with Soldier's Place is a large bronze sculpture by Larry Griffiths titled Birds in Flight (1980).

=== Colonial Circle ===
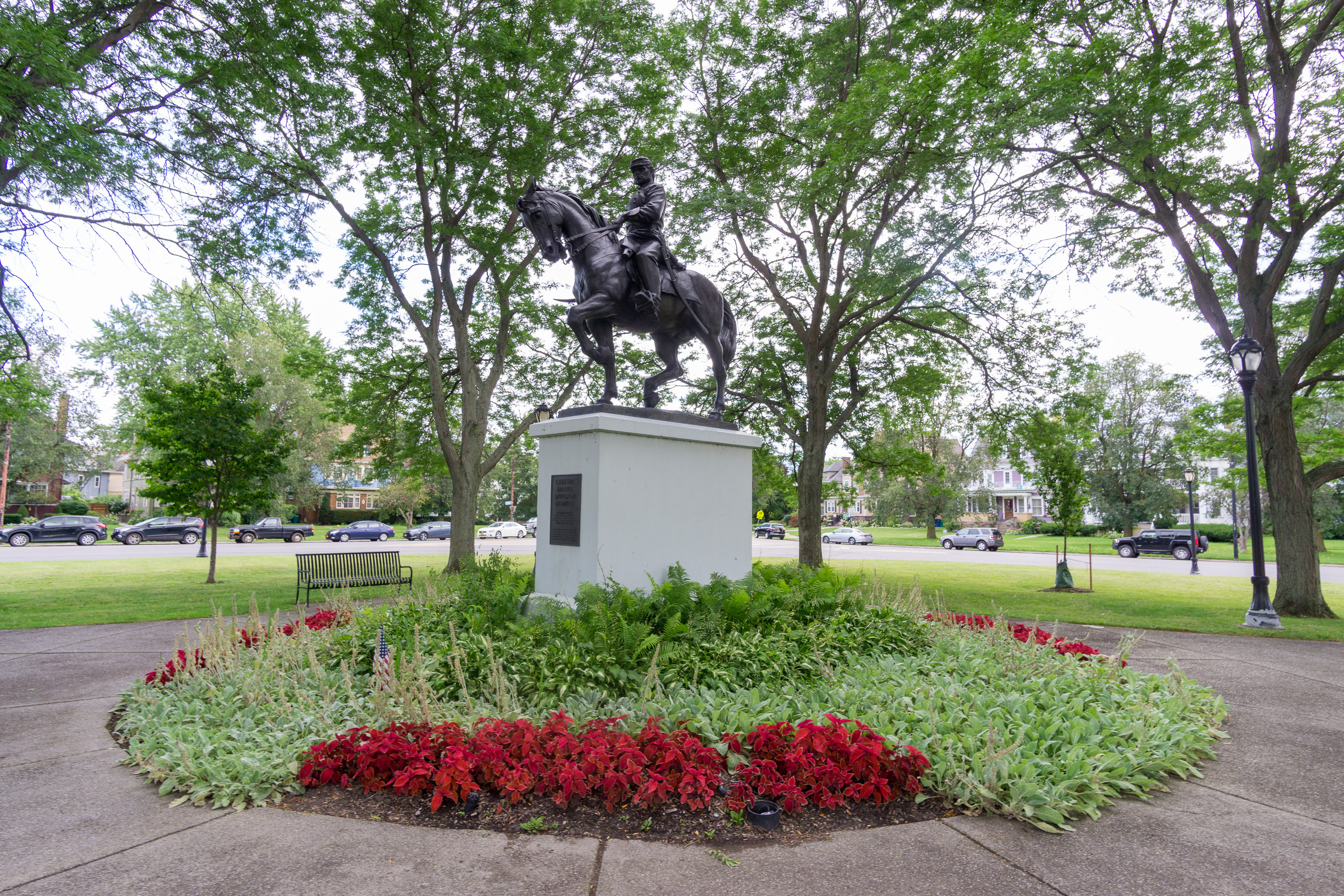
Colonial Circle

Formerly Bidwell Place; a 5.4-acre (2.2 ha) plot, 510 by 465 feet (155 by 142 m), at the intersection of Richmond Avenue, Bidwell Parkway, and Lafayette Avenue. The circle's center contains an equestrian statue of General Daniel D. Bidwell.

=== Richmond Avenue ===
Originally The Avenue; connects Symphony Circle to Colonial Circle; 100 feet (30 m) wide and 6,022 feet (1,836 m) in length. It traverses Ferry Circle at West Ferry Street.

=== Ferry Circle ===
A 300-foot-diameter (91 m) circle at the intersection of West Ferry Street, Massachusetts Street, and Richmond Avenue.

=== Symphony Circle ===
Originally known as just The Circle. A 500-foot-diameter (150 m), 4.5-acre (1.8 ha) circle at the juncture of Porter Avenue with Richmond Avenue, North Street, Pennsylvania Street, and Wadsworth Street. Due south of the circle lies First Presbyterian Church, Buffalo's oldest congregation. Kleinhans Music Hall is located on the southeast side of the circle; it was designated a National Historic Landmark in 1989. The circle is located within the Allentown Historic District.

=== Porter Avenue ===
A former city street incorporated into the parks system; connects Symphony Circle to Columbus Park and Front Park.

=== Columbus Park ===
Formerly Prospect Park; located at the intersection of Niagara Street and Porter Avenue; the site of the Connecticut Street Armory. The park is located adjacent to D'Youville College and is home to a branch of the Buffalo & Erie County Public Library. The Shelter House (c. 1908) is a contributing structure.

=== Front Park ===
Formerly The Front; a 32-acre (13 ha) park located at the beginning of the Niagara River and overlooking Lake Erie. The park is home to the U.S. entrance to the Peace Bridge, erected in 1927 on the site of the former Fort Porter, and includes baseball diamonds, large open playing fields, and tennis courts. The park contains a monument to Commodore Oliver Hazard Perry. The Picnic Shelter (c. 1900) is a contributing structure.

== See also ==
- Cazenovia Park-South Park System
