= Buffalo Museum of Science =

Museum

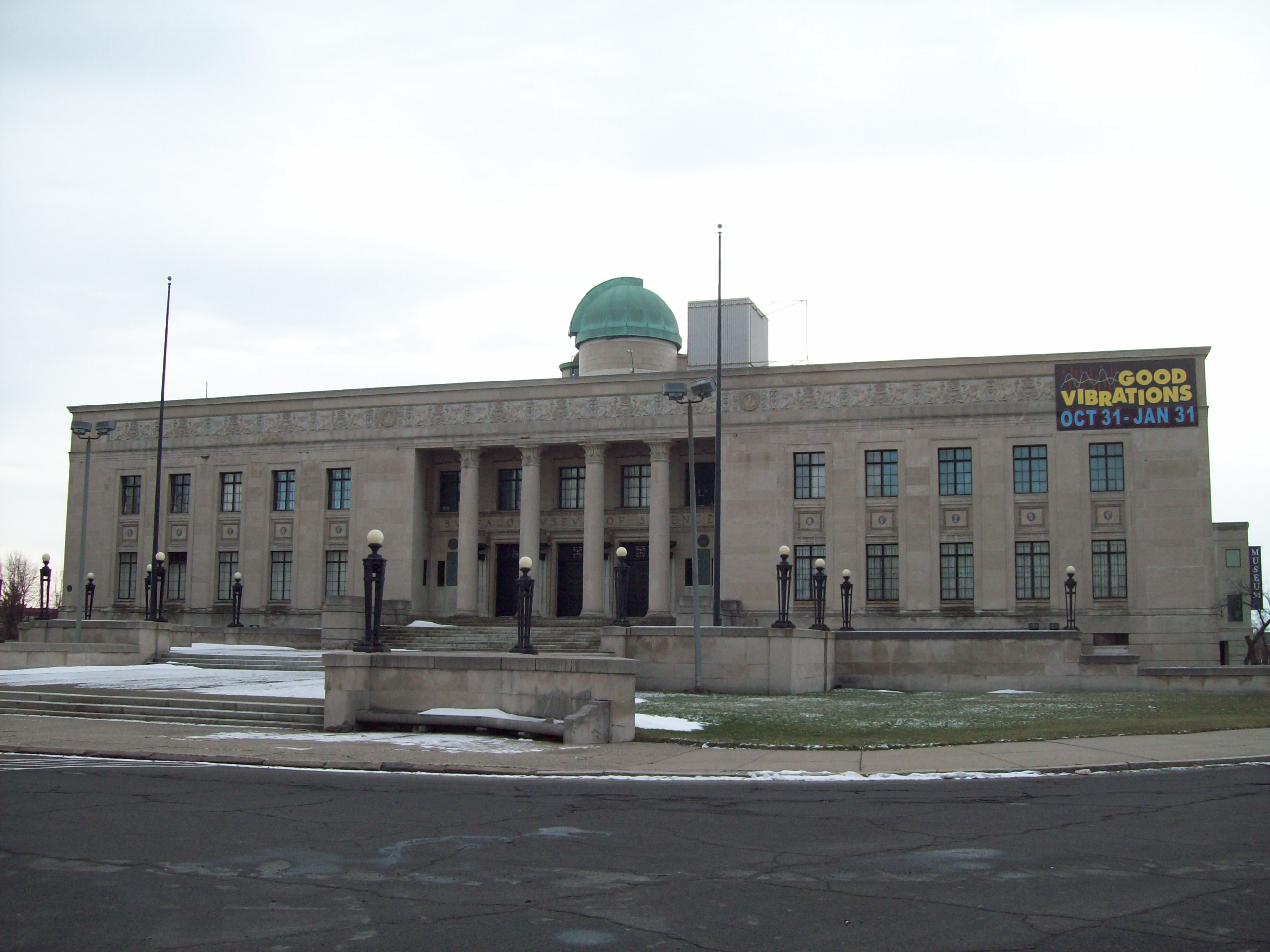
- Buffalo Museum of Science, December 2009
- Established: December 5, 1861
- Location: Buffalo, New York, U.S.
- Coordinates: 42.906132°N 78.843314°W
- Type: Science
- President: Gary Siddall
- Curator: Kathryn Leacock
- Website: www.sciencebuff.org

The Buffalo Museum of Science is a science museum located at Martin Luther King Jr. Park in Buffalo, New York, United States, northeast of the downtown district, near the Kensington Expressway. The historic building was designed by August Esenwein and James A. Johnson and was dedicated on January 19, 1929. It gave a permanent home to the exhibits that started to be collected by the Buffalo Young Men's Association (founded 1836), which had passed them to its 1861 creation, the Buffalo Natural History Society, with George W. Clinton chosen as the Society's first president.

The attractions of the Buffalo Museum of Science include exhibits showcasing animals, astronomy, the science of technology, and additional science topics.

== Exhibitions ==
=== Explorations ===
Explorations is an interactive gallery for children ages two to seven featuring new themes every month.

=== Explore You Science Studio ===
Explore You is a health systems science studio. The space was remodeled and opened in March 2012. The interactive exhibit gives a hands-on approach to health, exploring topics such as healthy choices, body systems, the heart, medical technology, genetics, and related research done in Western New York. It is sponsored by prominent local health insurance company Independent Health.

=== Rethink Extinct Science Studio ===
The Rethink Extinct Science Studio opened in March 2015 as remodel of the previous Extinction Gallery. This exhibit focuses on all aspects of extinction throughout the history of life on this planet including present-day extinctions and endangered plants and animals.

The Extinction Gallery was a collection of fossils and cultural pieces relating to organisms that have gone extinct on the planet. Specimens include 50-million-year-old birds, feathers and flowers, the earliest known land plant, a trilobite trapped in a seashell nearly 400 million years ago, a cast of a Tyrannosaurus rex skull, a compression fossil replica of Archaeopteryx, Triceratops horridus, Deinonychus antirrhopus, and Allosaurus fragilis. Many of the pieces in this exhibit come from the previous Dinosaurs and Co. space at the museum. In addition, a specimen of Albertosaurus sarcophagus (nicknamed "Stanley") is displayed in the first floor lobby next to admissions.

=== Nano ===
Nano is an interactive exhibition that engages family audiences in nanoscale science, engineering, and technology. Hands-on exhibits present the basics of nanoscience and engineering, introduce some real world applications, and explore the societal and ethical implications of this new technology.

=== Other exhibitions ===
Additional exhibitions include the Buffalo in Space Science Studio (opened in 2017), the Artifacts Science Studio (opened in March 2014), the In Motion Science Studio (opened in 2013), the Our Marvelous Earth Science Studio (opened in 2012), and the Bug Works Science Studio (opened in 2013).

In 2010 the museum began an extensive renovation campaign, the goal of which was to convert the old diorama based exhibits into interactive Science Studios. This campaign culminated with the renovation and reopening of the Kellogg Observatory in July 2018

== Previous exhibits ==
=== Whem Ankh: The Cycle of Life in Ancient Egypt ===
Whem Ankh was an exhibit running from 1998 to 2013 displaying artifacts from the daily life as lived on the banks of the lower Nile River 2,200 years ago. Over 250 artifacts are included in the collection, including the mummies of Nes-hor and of Nes-min, priests in the temple of the Egyptian fertility god Min, and the coffin of Djed-hor-ef-ankh.

Intended as a temporary exhibit, it was made permanent due to its initial popularity, which it enjoyed through most of its tenure. Whem Ankh closed in July 2013, and was replaced by the "Artifacts" exhibit in March 2014.

=== Marchand Hall of Wildflowers ===
The Marchand Hall of Wildflowers displayed numerous wax models of species of plant life created throughout several decades by naturalists George and Paul Marchand.

== Additional features ==
The museum also features the National Geographic 3D Cinema, Elements Café, and the Curiosity Shop.

== See also ==
- List of observatories
- List of museums in New York (state)
