= Green Mountain College =

Methodist college in Poultney, Vermont (1834–2019)

Coordinates: 43.5171°N 73.2396°W

- Seal of Green Mountain College
- Motto: Lux Fiat
- Motto in English: Let There Be Light
- Type: Private college
- Active: 1834; 192 years ago – 2019; 7 years ago
- Religious affiliation: United Methodist Church
- Location: Poultney, Vermont, United States
- Campus: 155 acres (0.63 km^{2})
- Colors: Golden yellow and hunter green
- Nickname: Eagles
- Mascot: Larry the Eagle
- Website: www.greenmtn.edu (archived on January 4, 2019)

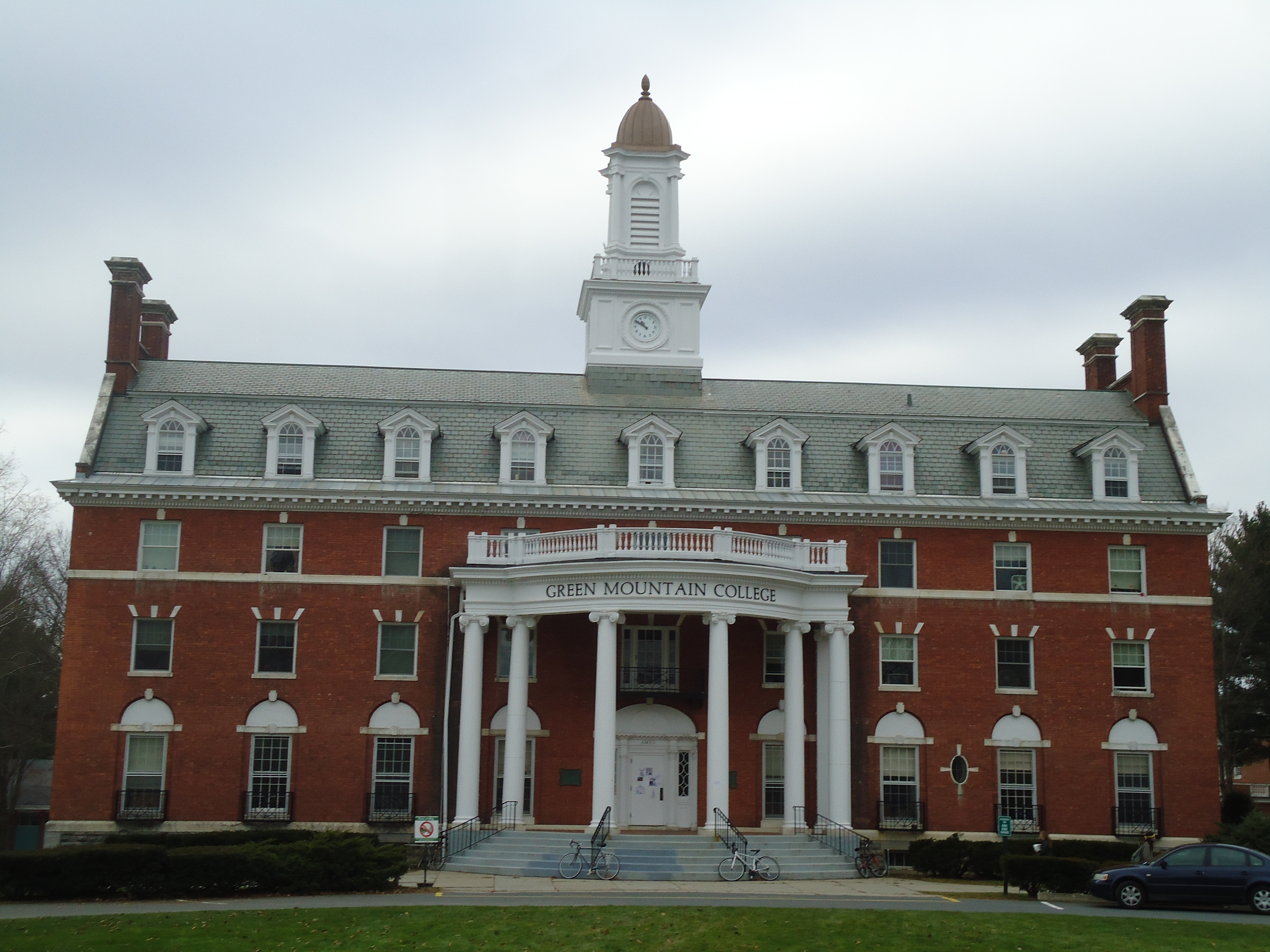
Ames Hall, Green Mountain College, November 2013

Green Mountain College was a private liberal arts college in Poultney, Vermont, United States. Located at the foot of the Taconic Mountains between the Green Mountains and Adirondacks, the college was historically affiliated with the United Methodist Church and offered a liberal arts undergraduate education with a focus on the environment, and some graduate degrees. For part of its history it was a women's college. It was founded in 1834 and closed at the end of the 2018–19 academic year.

== History ==
Green Mountain was founded in 1834 as Troy Conference Academy, a coeducational Methodist institution. It opened in 1837. In 1863, during a period of private operation, it became Ripley Female College; in 1874 it reopened as a Methodist college, again as Troy Conference Academy.

In 1937 it was renamed Green Mountain Junior College. Green Mountain became a two-year junior college for women in 1943. In 1974, the school changed its name to Green Mountain College and returned to coeducational status, offering four-year baccalaureate degrees. In the late 1990s the college began to focus on environmental literacy and citizenship.

=== Academics ===
Green Mountain College's core courses were known as the Environmental Liberal Arts curriculum, in environmental and natural sciences, writing, reading, history and philosophy. The college offered 23 undergraduate majors and the following graduate degrees: MBA in Sustainable Business; MS in Environmental Studies; MS in Sustainable Food Systems; and MS in Resilient and Sustainable Communities.

It was part of the Eco League, a group of liberal arts colleges committed to environmental sustainability.

GMC offered an educational track known as the Progressive Program. Based on the ideas of philosopher John Dewey, the students in the program defined their own education goals and worked with faculty members individually to meet them.

=== Green campus ===
In 2007, the Association for the Advancement of Sustainability in Higher Education awarded Green Mountain College the Campus Sustainability Leadership Award in the "Under 1,000" category. The award recognizes Green Mountain for commitment to environmental sustainability in its governance and administration, curriculum and research, operations, campus culture, and community outreach. GMC was also named the Sierra Club's #1 Cool School for 2018.

Green Mountain was named an EPA Energy Star Showcase Campus following campus-wide retrofitting of light fixtures.

Students installed a wind turbine to power the campus greenhouse and solar panels on the roof of the student center. On April 22, 2010, GMC formally opened a new combined heat and power biomass plant costing $5.8m.

Through the Student Campus Greening Fund every GMC student contributed $30 from the college activities fee. Students designed projects and submitted proposals. Awards were based on a student vote. SCGF money was used to install bike racks, purchase recycling bins, use bio-diesel in campus maintenance equipment, and upgrade the alternative energy systems that powered the farm greenhouse.

=== Student clubs ===
According to the college, its choral group was the only collegiate choir in the United States with a repertoire of Welsh language music.

== Closure ==
On January 23, 2019, Green Mountain's President, Robert W. Allen, announced that, despite a 2018 loan from the Department of Agriculture Rural Development Community Facilities Programs, the college had insufficient income to continue and would close that summer. Arizona's Prescott College, which also specializes in the environment and sustainability, agreed to allow Green Mountain students to complete their degrees at Prescott. Prescott also said it would maintain the college's student records and hire some Green Mountain faculty. There were approximately 430 students when the college closed.

The campus was offered for sale and then sold at auction in August 2020 to entrepreneur Raj Bhakta for $4.5 million. In 2024, Bhakta revealed plans to use the college buildings as hotel and condominium space. In February of 2026, Bhakta announced plans to give the campus to a donor through a Request for Proposals process. The ideal recipient would be a mission-based Catholic organization. In October 2026, evangelical Christian minister Tommie Zito purchased the Green Mountain College property for $6 million.

Zito said he planned to use the property to establish Z University to educate "up to 1,000 students to preach Christian gospel as part of a national religious awakening."

== Notable alumni ==
- Amsale Aberra – Ethiopian-born American fashion designer and entrepreneur
- William Duell – actor and singer
- Sandra Elkin - television talk show host
- Burton D. Esmond – lawyer and New York assemblyman
- Richie Grant – soccer coach
- Edward H. Ripley – businessman and Union Army officer in the Civil War
- William Y. W. Ripley – Union Army officer in the Civil War and recipient of the Medal of Honor
- George E. Royce – businessman and banker

== See also ==
- List of colleges and universities in the United States
- List of colleges and universities in Vermont
