= Timeline of Buffalo, New York =

City history timeline

The following is a timeline of the history of the city of Buffalo, New York, United States.

== Prior to 18th century ==
- 1620 - Erie Nation occupies area
- 1651 - Seneca Nation destroys Erie Nation
- 1679 - La Salle built Fort Conti and launched Le Griffon.
- 1687 - Marquis de Denonville built Fort Denonville at the mouth of the river.

== 18th century ==
- 1784 - Area known as the Buffalo Creek region.
- 1793 - Holland Land Purchase is completed

== 19th century ==
The 1805 plan for the village of Buffalo

=== 1800s-1860s ===
- 1801 - Buffalo is founded by Joseph Ellicott.
- 1810 - Population: 1,508.
- 1811 - Buffalo Gazette newspaper begins publication.
- 1813 - December 30: Battle of Buffalo fought during the War of 1812.
- 1816 - Village incorporated in Niagara County.
- 1818 - Walk-in-the-Water Great Lakes passenger steamboat begins operating. It was named after Walk-in-the-Water a Huron chief.
- 1820 - Population: 2,095.
- 1821 - Buffalo designated seat of newly created Erie County.
- 1825 - Erie Canal opens.
- 1830 - Population: 8,668.
- 1832
  - City of Buffalo incorporated.
  - Ebenezer Johnson served as the first Mayor.
- 1833 - Lake Shore and Michigan Southern Railway established.
- 1834 - Cholera.
- 1835 - November 11: "Cyclone" occurs.
- 1836
  - Young Men's Association active.
  - Buffalo Library (social library) organized.
- 1840 - Population: 18,213.
- 1842 - Joseph Dart invented the Dart's Elevator, a steam-powered grain elevator.
- 1844 - A seiche on Lake Erie sends a 22-foot (6.7 m) surge of water onshore, killing 78 people.
- 1846 - University of Buffalo and its Medical School established.
- 1847 - Roman Catholic Diocese of Buffalo established.
- 1848 - June: 1848 Free Soil Party national convention held in Buffalo; Martin Van Buren nominated as U.S. presidential candidate.
- 1849 - Forest Lawn Cemetery established.
- 1850 - Population: 42,261.
- 1851
  - St. Paul's Cathedral built.
  - Buffalo Seminary founded.
- 1852 - Metropolitan Theatre is built and opens.
- 1853 - New York Central Railroad in operation.
- 1854 - YMCA U.S. branch organized in Buffalo.
- 1856
  - Chippewa Market opens.
  - Manufacturers and Traders Bank in business.
- 1858 - Broadway Arsenal opened.
- 1860 - Population: 81,129.
- 1861
  - Buffalo Society of Natural Sciences founded.
  - St. Joseph's Collegiate Institute founded.
- 1862 - Buffalo Historical Society formed.
- 1863 - St. Joseph Cathedral consecrated.
- 1868 - Metropolitan Theatre is renovated and re-opens as the Academy of Music

=== 1870s-1890s ===
- 1870
  - Richardson Olmsted Complex built.
  - Roman Catholic (Jesuit) Canisius College founded.
  - Population: 117,714.
- 1871 - Buffalo Normal School founded, became "State Normal and Training School"
- 1873
  - Church of St. Stanislaus, Bishop and Martyr established.
  - International Railway Bridge to Canada opens.
  - Buffalo Sunday Morning News begins publication.
- 1874 - "The number of ships built at Buffalo was thirty-seven."
- 1875
  - County and City Hall constructed.
  - Population: 134,238.
- 1876
  - Delaware Park–Front Park System developed.
  - Delaware Avenue Methodist Episcopal Church built.
- 1880 - Population: 155,134.
- 1881 - Architect Louise Blanchard Bethune in business.
- 1882 - Grover Cleveland becomes mayor.
- 1886
  - Westinghouse AC electrical power station begins operating.
  - University of Buffalo School of Pharmacy established.
- 1887
  - University at Buffalo Law School established.
  - The Buffalo Orchestral Association, Buffalo's first professional orchestra, was founded with John Lund as its conductor.
- 1890 - Population: 255,664.
- 1892 - University of Buffalo School of Dental Medicine established.
- 1893
  - Buffalo and Susquehanna Railroad in operation.
  - Former mayor Grover Cleveland becomes U.S. president.
- 1894 - Twentieth Century Club founded.
- 1896 - Ellicott Square Building completed.
- 1899 - Labor strike of grain workers.
- 1900
  - Manufacture of Thomas Auto-Bi motorcycle begins.
  - Population: 352,387.

== 20th century ==
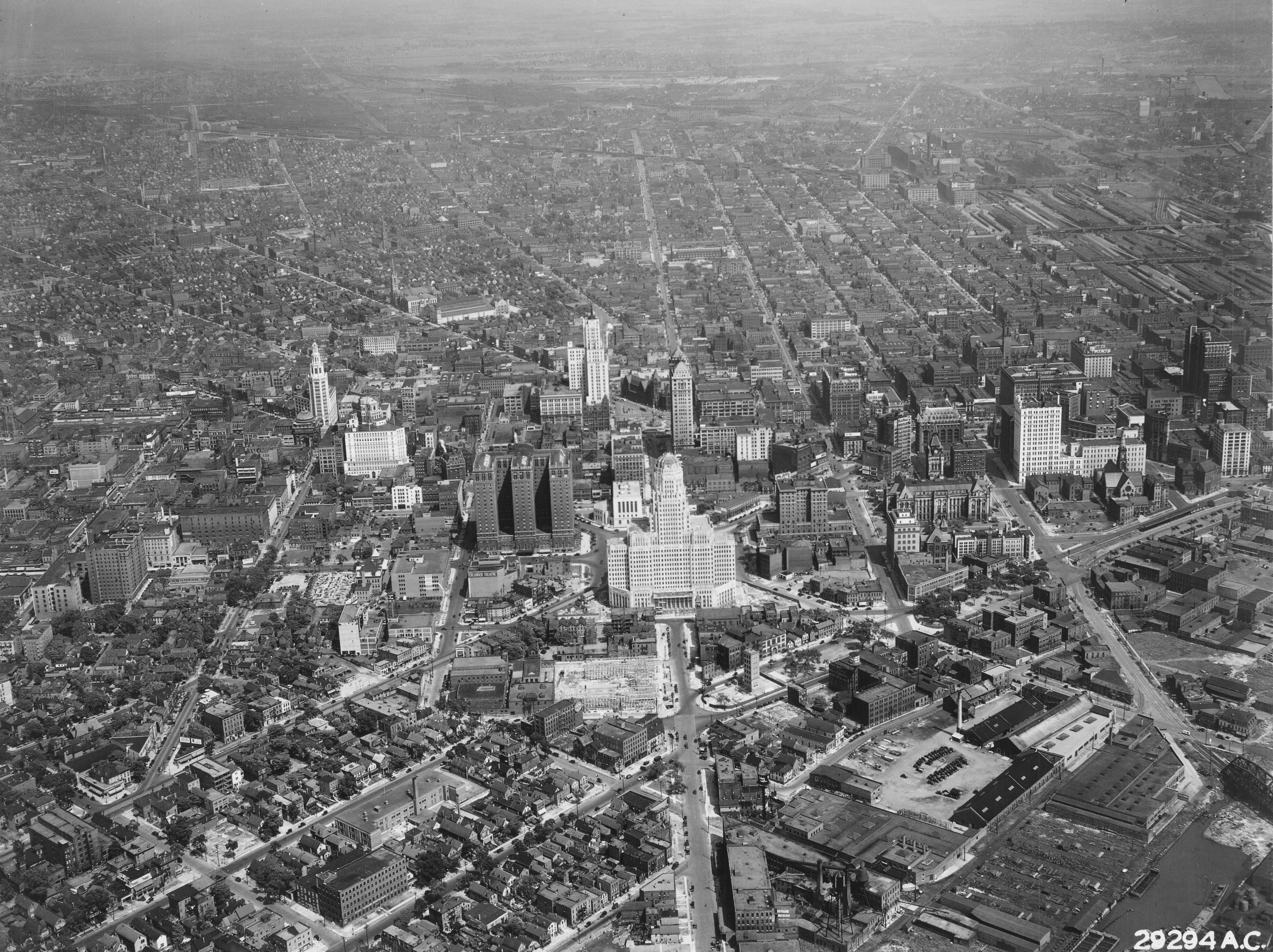
Downtown Buffalo in 1945

- 1901
  - May 1: Pan-American Exposition opens in Delaware Park.
  - September 6: Assassination of William McKinley, U.S. president.
  - September 14: Inauguration of Theodore Roosevelt as U.S. president.
  - September 23–24: Trial of assassin Leon Czolgosz held.
- 1902 - YMCA Central Building built.
- 1905 - Albright Art Gallery (of modern art) opens.
- 1908
  - D'Youville College founded.
  - Hotel Statler in business (first in chain).
- 1910 - Population: 423,715.
- 1914 - Art Theater in business.
- 1917 - December 9: Snowstorm.
- 1919
  - The new Erie Canal was rebuilt as a barge canal.
  - Rivoli Theatre in business.
- 1920
  - University at Buffalo raised an endowment of $5m. by popular subscription.
  - Population: 506,775.
- 1921 - Loew's State Theatre in business.
- 1922 - WGR radio begins broadcasting.
- 1922 - McVan's nightclub, a popular music venue in the city, opens. Over the years it hosted some of the biggest names in music including Nat King Cole, Ella Fitzgerald, Art Tatum and Jimi Hendrix.
- 1923 - On February 24, Phi Omega chapter of the National Omega Psi Phi fraternity was chartered at University of New York at Buffalo as first African American Greek-Lettered Fraternity established in western New York.
- 1924
  - DuPont cellophane manufactory begins operating.
  - WEBR radio begins broadcasting.
- 1926
  - Buffalo Courier-Express newspaper in publication (ceased 1982).
  - Buffalo Niagara International Airport, then known as "Buffalo Municipal Airport", opens in nearby Cheektowaga
  - Shea's Performing Arts Center opens.
- 1927 - Peace Bridge to Canada opens.
- 1929 - Buffalo Museum of Science and Buffalo Central Terminal open to public.
- 1932 - Buffalo City Hall built.
- 1936 - Coin-operated Launder-Ur-Own laundromat in business.
- 1940 - Buffalo Memorial Auditorium opened
- 1948 - WBEN-TV (television) begins broadcasting.
- 1950 - Population: 580,132.
- 1953 - New zoning laws include parking minimums, these new zoning laws are a factor in the decline of Buffalo over the following decades.
- 1954 - WGR-TV (television) begins broadcasting.
- 1960 - Buffalo Bills Football Inaugural Season. Team is second professional team with the name and the third professional football franchise in the city.
- 1966
  - January: Blizzard.
  - Theodore Roosevelt Inaugural National Historic Site established.
- 1967 - Race riot occurs in East Buffalo as part of Long, hot summer of 1967
- 1970
  - Buffalo Sabres Hockey Inaugural Season
  - Buffalo Braves Basketball Inaugural Season. Team plays 8 seasons in Buffalo before relocating to San Diego and later Los Angeles to become the Los Angeles Clippers
- 1971
  - February 22: Blizzard.
  - Erie Community College Buffalo campus established.
- 1977 - January: Blizzard of '77.
- 1979
  - Buffalo and Erie County Naval & Military Park established.
  - Amtrak closes Buffalo Central Terminal, redirecting passenger rail service to the Exchange Street and Depew stations
- 1983 -
  - a propane explosion, resulting in 6 fatalities and widespread destruction, including leveling most of the local city block.
- 1984 -
  - Buffalo Metro Rail begins service
  - Republic Steel shutters South Buffalo mill
  - McVan's nightclub closes
- 1988 - Sahlen Field (then known as "Pilot Field") opens, replacing War Memorial Stadium
- 1989 - Western New York Documentary Heritage Program headquartered in Buffalo.
- 1990 - Population: 328,123.
- 1996
  - KeyBank Center (then named Marine Midland Center) opens, replacing the Buffalo Memorial Auditorium
  - City website online (approximate date).

== 21st century ==
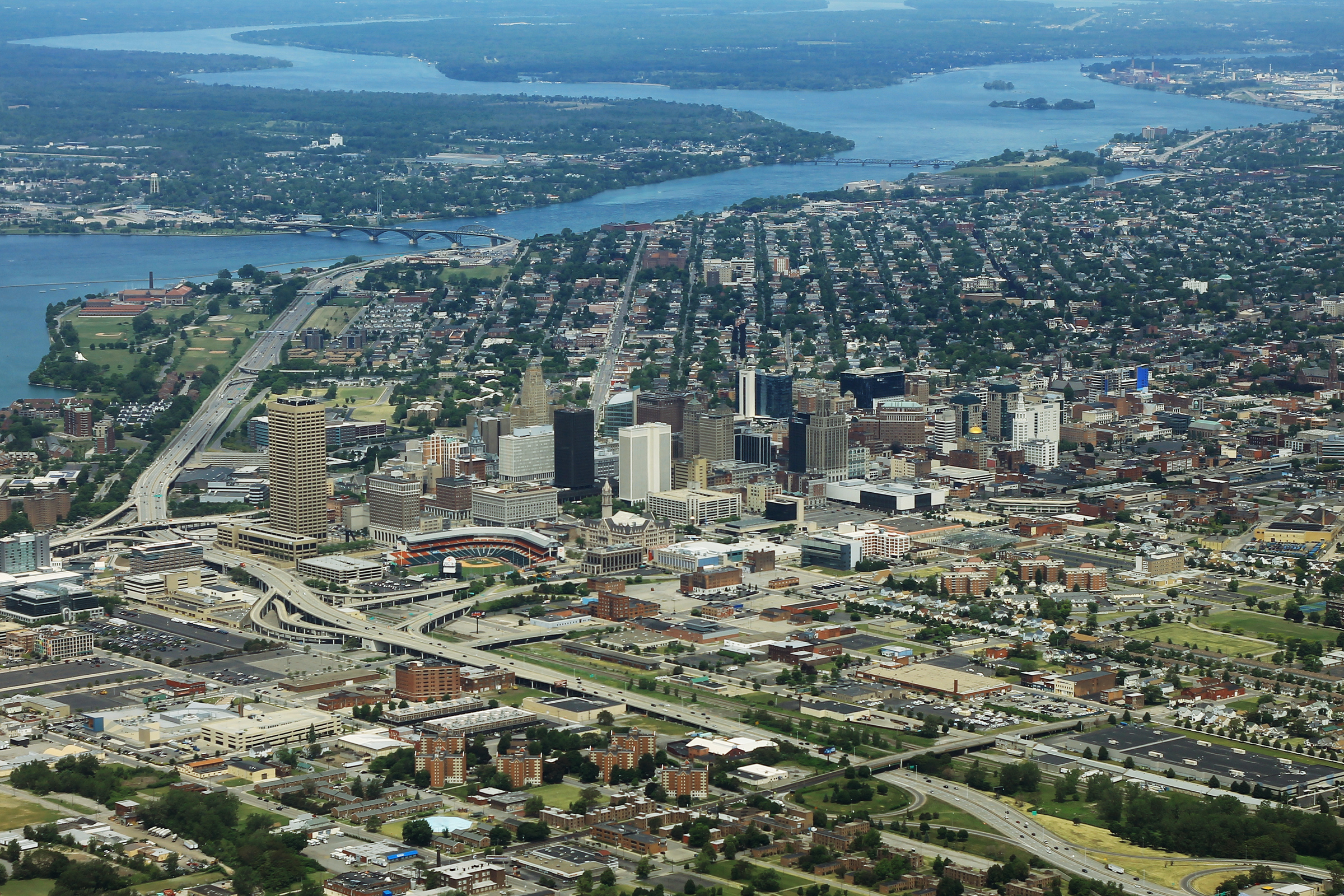
Buffalo's skyline from the air in 2018

- 2000 - Population: 292,648
- 2001
  - Buffalo Niagara Medical Campus established
  - December: Snowstorm.
- 2005
  - Byron Brown becomes mayor.
  - Brian Higgins becomes U.S. representative for New York's 27th congressional district.
- 2006 - October 13: Lake Storm "Aphid"
- 2008 - Canalside, then named Erie Canal Harbor, reopens to public after early phase of redevelopment work.
- 2010 - Population: 261,310.
- 2014 - November 17–20: "Snowvember" snowstorm.
- 2017
  - Minimum parking requirements were eliminated citywide in order to revitalize the city after decades of decline.
  - Tesla, Inc. opens Giga New York solar panel factory on old Republic Steel site
- 2020
  - Population: 278,349, Buffalo finally gains population again after 70 years.
  - Buffalo police shoving incident occurs as part of George Floyd protests
- 2022
  - May 14: 2022 Buffalo shooting: 10 are killed and 3 injured in a racially motivated attack at a Tops Friendly Markets store. It is the deadliest shooting in the city's history.
  - December 23–27: A snowstorm kills 41 people, becoming the deadliest snowstorm in the city's history.
- 2023
  - Mayor Byron Brown begins his 5th term, becoming the longest-serving mayor of Buffalo.
  - A magnitude 3.8 earthquake affects the Buffalo area in February.
- 2025
  - Sean Ryan is elected mayor of Buffalo

== See also ==
- History of Buffalo, New York
- On This Day Calendar by The Buffalo History Museum
- National Register of Historic Places listings in Buffalo, New York
- Timelines of other cities in New York state: New York City (also Bronx, Brooklyn, Queens); Saratoga Springs

== Bibliography ==
- Directory for the City of Buffalo, L.P. Crary, 1832
- "Buffalo City". Gazetteer of the State of New York. J. Disturnell. 1842. pp. 91–93.
- Buffalo City Directory, E.A. Thomas, 1862
- "Buffalo", Appletons' Handbook of American Travel: Northern and Eastern Tour, New York: D. Appleton, 1870
- Joseph Sabin, ed. (1870). "Buffalo". Bibliotheca Americana. Vol. 3. New York: J. Sabin. hdl:2027/nyp.33433082126743. OCLC 13972268.
- Franklin B. Hough (1872), "Erie County: Buffalo City", Gazetteer of the State of New York, Albany, N.Y: Andrew Boyd, OCLC 18450990
- "Buffalo (2.)" . Encyclopædia Britannica. Vol. 4 (9th ed.). 1878. p. 443.
- Knights of Pythias Directory and Buffalo Street Directory and Guide, Albert J. Kuebler and Fred Kraebel, 1894
- History of the City of Buffalo. Buffalo Evening News. 1908.
- "Buffalo", United States (4th ed.), Leipzig: K. Baedeker, 1909, OCLC 02338437
- "Buffalo (city)" . Encyclopædia Britannica. Vol. 4 (11th ed.). 1910. pp. 754–756.
- Wilner, Merton Merriman (1922). "Buffalo" . Encyclopædia Britannica. Vol. 30 (12th ed.).
- Federal Writers' Project (1940), "Buffalo", New York: a Guide to the Empire State, American Guide Series, New York: Oxford University Press, pp. 206–228, hdl:2027/uc1.b3627138 – via HathiTrust
- Ory Mazar Nergal, ed. (1980), "Buffalo, NY", Encyclopedia of American Cities, New York: E. P. Dutton, OL 4120668M
- George Thomas Kurian (1994), "Buffalo", World Encyclopedia of Cities, vol. 1: North America, Santa Barbara, Calif.: ABC-CLIO, OL 1431653M
- Paul T. Hellmann (2006). "New York: Buffalo". Historical Gazetteer of the United States. Taylor & Francis. ISBN 1-135-94859-3.
- "175 Years: Celebrating the Incorporation of the City of Buffalo, 1832-2007". Buffalo History Museum. 2007.
- "Buffalo, NY". U.S. City Open Data Census. Sunlight Foundation and Open Knowledge International. 2018. Archived from the original on November 18, 2018.
