= Timeline of Saratoga Springs, New York =

City history timeline

The following is a timeline of the history of Saratoga Springs, New York, USA

Historical affiliations

Kingdom of Great Britain ca. 1664–1776
United States of America 1776–present

== Prior to 19th century ==
- 1643 – Father Isaac Jogues reported to have visited the springs for which the city would be so named.
- 1691 – English settlers build Fort Saratoga.
- 1767 – William Johnson, a British soldier and hero of the French and Indian Wars, is treated by Native Americans for his war wounds at springs 10 miles (16 km) outside of the village (now known as High Rock Spring).
- 1775 – The first European-American settler, Dirck Shouten, builds a dwelling near the High Rock Spring. However, he is later forced to relocate on warnings from the Native Americans to stay away from the spring.
- 1777 – The Battles of Saratoga are fought nearby in the Town of Stillwater.
- 1783 – George Washington attempts to purchase the High Rock Spring and others.
- 1789 – Gideon Putnam builds the first hotel for travelers.

== 19th century ==
- 1802 – Gideon Putnam constructs the Union Hall hotel near the Congress Spring.
- 1810 - Population: 1,909.
- 1811 – Putnam dies of injuries sustained during construction of Congress Hall.
- 1819 – The Town of Saratoga Spring established; set off from a western portion of the Town of Saratoga.
- 1824 – The first United States Hotel is built.
- 1826 – Principal community incorporated as the Village of Saratoga Springs.
- 1833 - Saratoga and Schenectady Railroad opens for service with steam powered trains.
- 1853 - Potato chips are created by George Crum at Moon's Lakehouse
- 1855 - The Saratogian begins publication.
- 1863 – Saratoga Race Course opens.

== 20th century ==
- 1902 - The Adirondack Trust Company is founded.
- 1903 – Lucy Ann Skidmore founds the Young Woman's Industrial Club.
- 1911 – The YWIC is chartered as the Skidmore School of Arts.
- 1913 - Congress Park in its present incarnation is created.
- 1915
  - April 7: The City of Saratoga Springs is incorporated by charter.
  - June 8: Walter P. Butler is elected the city's first mayor.
  - June 26: The Spencer Trask memorial, The Spirit of Life, is dedicated at Congress Park.
- 1917 - St. Clements Roman Catholic Church is consecrated, and holds its first Mass.
- 1918 - Harry Pettee elected mayor
- 1919 - James D. McNulty elected mayor
- 1922 – Skidmore College founded.
- 1923 - Humorist Clarence Knapp elected mayor.
- 1926 - Yaddo established as an artists' retreat.
- 1927 - William Eddy elected mayor.
- 1928 - Population: 14,000.
- 1935 - Addison Mallery elected mayor; he would become the longest-serving mayor in the city's history.
- 1937 - Saratoga released.
- 1941 - June 26: The Saratoga Raceway opens.
- 1945
  - The second Stewart's Shops opens in Saratoga Springs, following the opening of the first shop in nearby Ballston Spa.
  - The United States Hotel on the corner of Broadway and Division Street is razed.
- 1946 - Racing resumes at the Saratoga Race Course after three years due to wartime rationing; during that time, all Saratoga races were run at Belmont Park.
- 1950
  - August 1: The National Racing Museum and Hall of Fame opens at the Canfield Casino.
  - The Saratoga Springs Public Library opens on the corner of Broadway and Spring Street near Congress Park.
- 1952 - Demolition of the Grand Union Hotel begins
- 1953 - Meyer Lansky serves his only prison sentence: three months in the Saratoga County Jail for gambling at the Arrowhead Inn.
- 1955 - The National Museum and Racing Hall of Fame relocates to its current location on Union Avenue, near the Saratoga Race Course.
- 1957 - A block of buildings on Broadway is destroyed in a massive fire; one police officer is killed.
- 1959 - November 3: James E. Benton elected mayor.
- 1960 – May 20: Caffè Lena opens for the first time.
- 1961
  - The Saratoga Springs train station opens at its current location off West Avenue.
  - June: Bob Dylan first performs at Caffè Lena.
  - October 28: Skidmore College acquires the 850-acre (3.4 km^{2}) Jonsson Campus in the former Woodlawn Park.
- 1963
  - Saratoga Race Course celebrates its centennial.
  - July 19 – The section of Interstate 87 (the Adirondack Northway) in Saratoga between Exits 14 and 15 is completed.
  - November 5: Arthur J. Kearney elected mayor.
- 1964 - December 4: Ice storm hits Saratoga Springs
- 1965
  - November 2 - James A. Murphy elected mayor.
  - November 9 - Saratoga Springs loses electrical power as a result of the Northeast blackout of 1965.
  - November 14 – Convention Hall on Broadway near Congress Park destroyed in fire.
- 1966
  - Skidmore College opens its first buildings on the uptown Jonsson Campus off North Broadway; the move would take seven years to reach completion.
  - July 8: Saratoga Performing Arts Center (SPAC) opens with a performance of Shakespeare's A Midsummer Night's Dream.
- 1969
  - Saratoga Springs High School relocated to present location between West Avenue and West Circular Street; former site becomes Lake Avenue Elementary School
  - November 4: Sarto Smaldone, owner of the Malta Drive-In, elected mayor.
- 1970 - The Tin & Lint opens on 2 Caroline Street as "The Bar With No Name".
- 1973 - November 6: Raymond Watkin elected mayor.
- 1977 - January 7: The Saratoga Springs Preservation Foundation is founded.
- 1979 - November 6: Ellsworth Jones elected mayor; serves in that post for the entire 1980s.
- 1984 - August 2: Saratoga Springs City Center opens.
- 1985 - Home Made Theater stages its first performance at the Spa Little Theater: Wait Until Dark
- 1986
  - The National Museum of Dance and Hall of Fame opens
  - First running of the Head of the Fish regatta at Saratoga Lake
- 1987 - Kayderosseras Park closes
- 1989 - November 7: Almeda C. Dake elected mayor; first female mayor in the city's history.
- 1990 - Population: 25,001.
- 1995
  - The Saratoga Springs Public Library relocates to its current location on Henry Street.
  - November 7: J. Michael O'Connell elected mayor.
- 1996 - December 31: Saratoga hosts its first ever "First Night" New Year's Eve celebrations.
- 1997 - The Pfeil Building opens on Broadway; the mixed-use building is the first to open on Broadway in 50 years.
- 1999 - November 2: Kenneth Klotz elected mayor

== 21st century ==
- 2000
  - Population: 26,186.
  - The Frances Young Tang Teaching Museum and Art Gallery opens on the Skidmore College campus.
- 2001 : The Lake Avenue armory becomes home to the New York State Military Museum.
- 2002
  - June: The carousel formerly at Kayderosseras Park reopens in Congress Park.
  - June: The Saratoga Automobile Museum opens at Saratoga Spa State Park.
  - Fiberglass painted horses appear at various locations downtown.
- 2003
  - August 14: Saratoga Springs is involved in another major blackout.
  - November 4: Michael Lenz, former Commissioner of Finance, elected mayor.
- 2004 - January 28: Saratoga Gaming and Raceway opens.
- 2005 - November 8: Valerie M. Keehn elected mayor.
- 2007
  - The Ellsworth Ice Cream plant closes after 74 years of operation.
  - November 6: Scott Johnson elected mayor.
- 2010
  - Population: 26,586.
  - February 5: The Arthur Zankel Music Center opens on the Skidmore campus.
- 2011
  - Saratoga Gaming and Raceway becomes Saratoga Casino and Raceway.
  - August 28: Three-quarters of Saratoga Springs loses electricity and the card at Saratoga Race Course is cancelled during Hurricane Irene.
- 2012
  - July 24: The city's memorial to the September 11 attacks is sited and dedicated at High Rock Park.
  - Market Center Apartments opens on Railroad Place between Division and Church Streets.
  - New parking garage opens on Woodlawn Avenue.
- 2013
  - Saratoga Race Course celebrates its 150th anniversary.
  - November 5: Joanne Dittes Yepsen elected mayor.
- 2014
  - August 31: Tom Durkin calls his last race at Saratoga Race Course after 24 years.
- 2015
  - Saratoga Springs celebrates the centennial of its city charter.
    - Centennial Park and Saratoga Waterfront Park dedicated.
    - June 26: The Spirit of Life statue in Congress Park is renovated.
    - Fall: The High Rock Spring is re-recognized as the origin of the city.
- 2016
  - Summer: SPAC celebrates its fiftieth anniversary.
- 2017
  - November 7: Megan Kelly elected mayor.
- 2018
  - August 17: City Hall catches fire after lightning strikes the building
  - September 3: Sam "The Bugler" Grossman retires after 25 years at the track.
- 2019
  - November 5: Ron Kim elected mayor.
- 2020
  - Population: 28,491
  - COVID-19 pandemic in New York (state)
    - Saratoga Performing Arts Center season cancelled for the first time ever
    - July 16 – September 7: The 152nd Saratoga Race Course meet is run without fans in attendance
- 2021
  - July 15 – September 6: Saratoga Race Course reopens to fans at full capacity with the loosening of COVID-19 restrictions for the 153rd meet
- 2023
  - November 7: John Safford elected mayor.
- 2024-2026
  - The Belmont Stakes are run at Saratoga Race Course due to renovations at Belmont Park; the 158th meet was noteworthy for being the longest ever, starting during the Independence Day weekend in celebration of the United States Semiquincentennial

== See also ==
- Timelines of other cities in New York state: Buffalo, New York City (also Bronx, Brooklyn, Queens)
