= Michigan Street Baptist Church =

Historic church in New York, United States

- Macedonia Baptist Church
- U.S. National Register of Historic Places
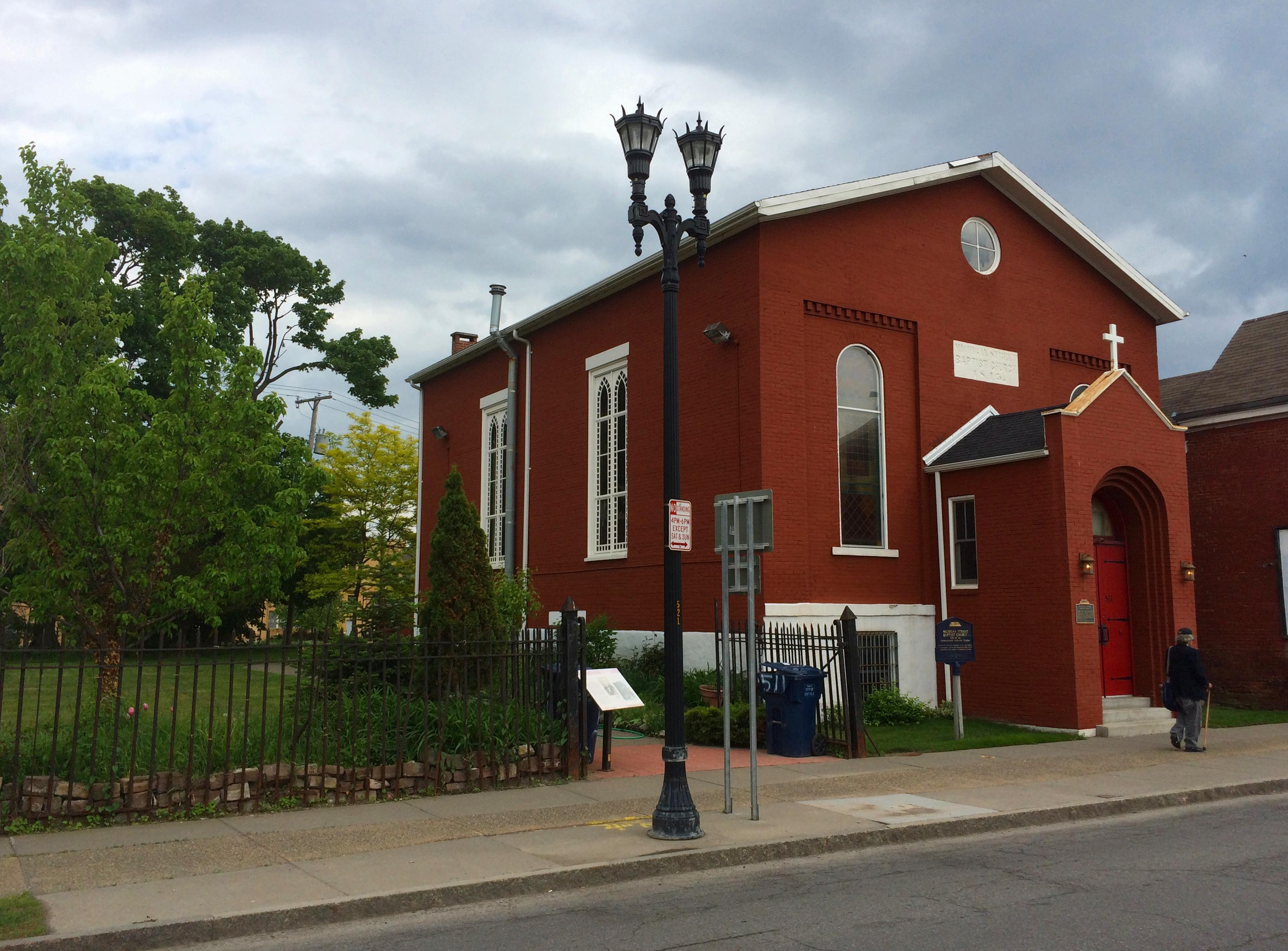
- The Macedonia Baptist Church building

- Location within New York Location within the United States
- Location: 511 Michigan Ave., Buffalo, New York
- Coordinates: 42°53′10″N 78°52′3″W
- Built: 1845
- NRHP reference No.: 74001233
- Added to NRHP: February 12, 1974

Macedonia Baptist Church, more commonly known as Michigan Street Baptist Church, is a historic African American Baptist church located at Buffalo in Erie County, New York. It is a brick church constructed in 1845. Samuel H. Davis was the congregation's fifth pastor, helped raise money for a church building, and as a mason did much of the construction himself. He gave the welcoming address at the 1843 National Convention of Colored Citizens of America.

Rev. J. Edward Nash (1868–1957) served the congregation from 1892 to 1953. His home, the Rev. J. Edward Nash, Sr. House, is located nearby. Rev. Nash's papers are partially digitized at Buffalo State University.

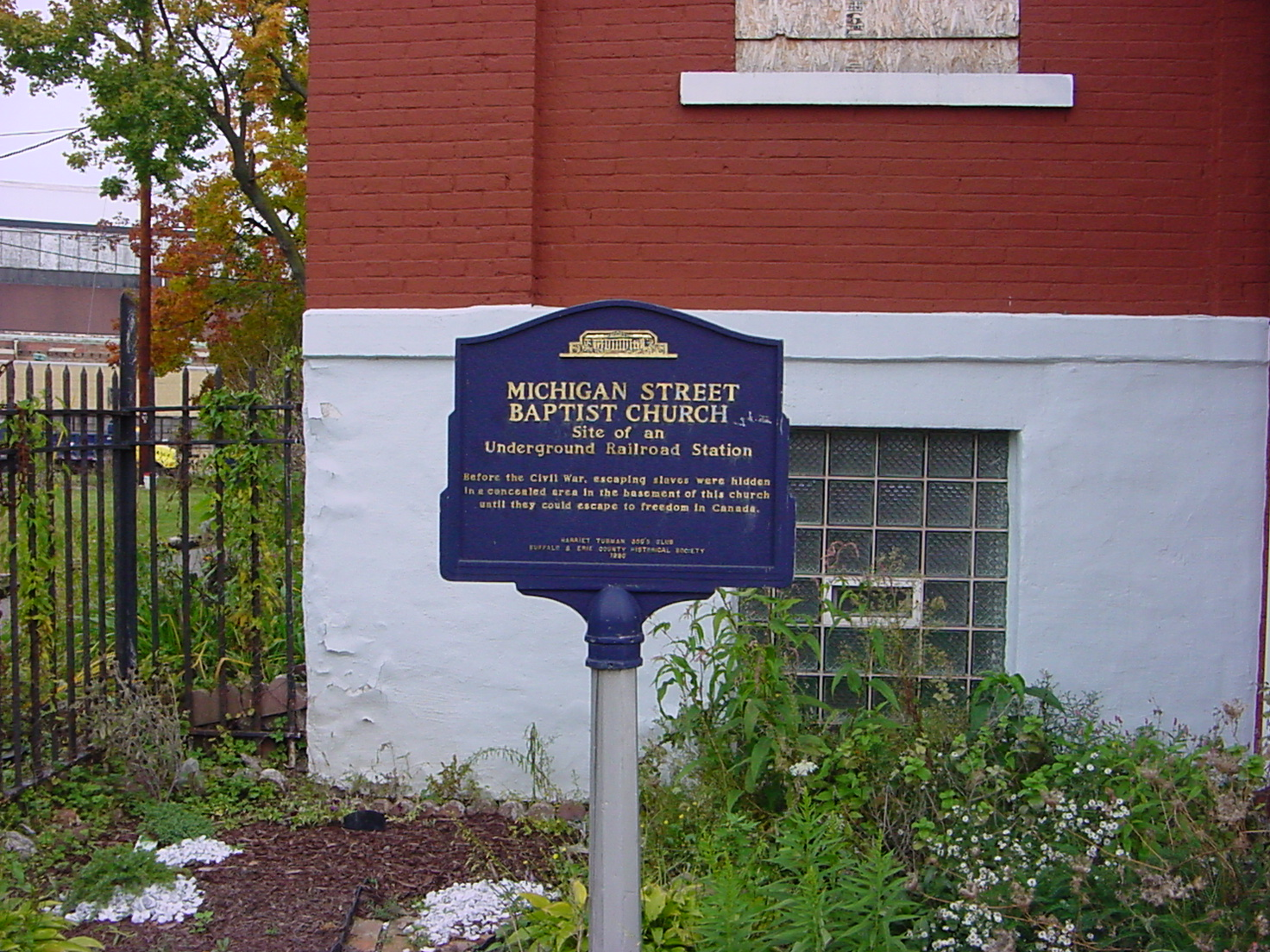
Site marker for the former Michigan Street Baptist Church.

It was listed on the National Register of Historic Places in 1974.

In 1997, Dr. Monroe Fordham wrote the first scholarly history of the congregation and its building.

In 2013, the church was the subject of a thorough historic structure report, which is now online at Archive.org.
