= Samuel H. Davis (civil rights leader) =

US religious and civil rights leader

Samuel H. Davis (August 13, 1810 – 1907) was a religious and civil rights leader in the United States. He was a pastor at the Michigan Street Baptist Church and chaired the National Convention of Colored Citizens of America held in Buffalo, New York from August 15 to August 19, 1843.

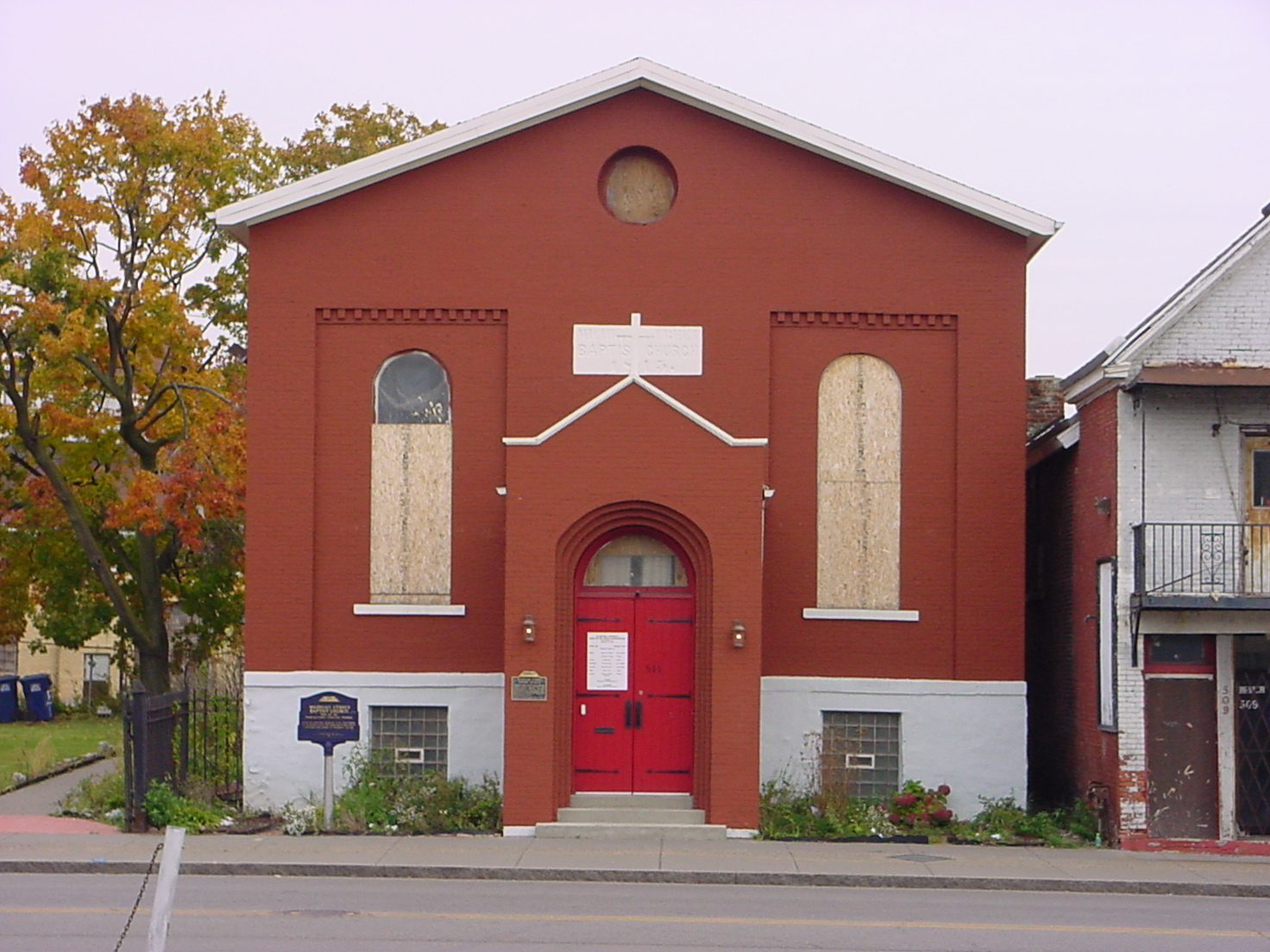
Michigan Street Baptist Church

Davis was born in Temple Mills, Maine. He lived in Buffalo, New York.

Davis studied at Oberlin College in Ohio. Afterwards he spent time in Windsor, Canada before returning to Buffalo. He worked as a mason. He taught at a Buffalo school for African Americans. Davis was the fifth pastor of the Michigan Street Baptist Church, reached the funding level needed for a church building for the congregation, and built much of it himself. The church was a stop on the Underground Railroad. In 2011, signage was unveiled at the church commemorating its history and Samuel H. Davis. Attendees included his descendants.
