= Rev. J. Edward Nash Sr. House =

Historic house in Buffalo, New York

- U.S. National Register of Historic Places
- New York State Register of Historic Places
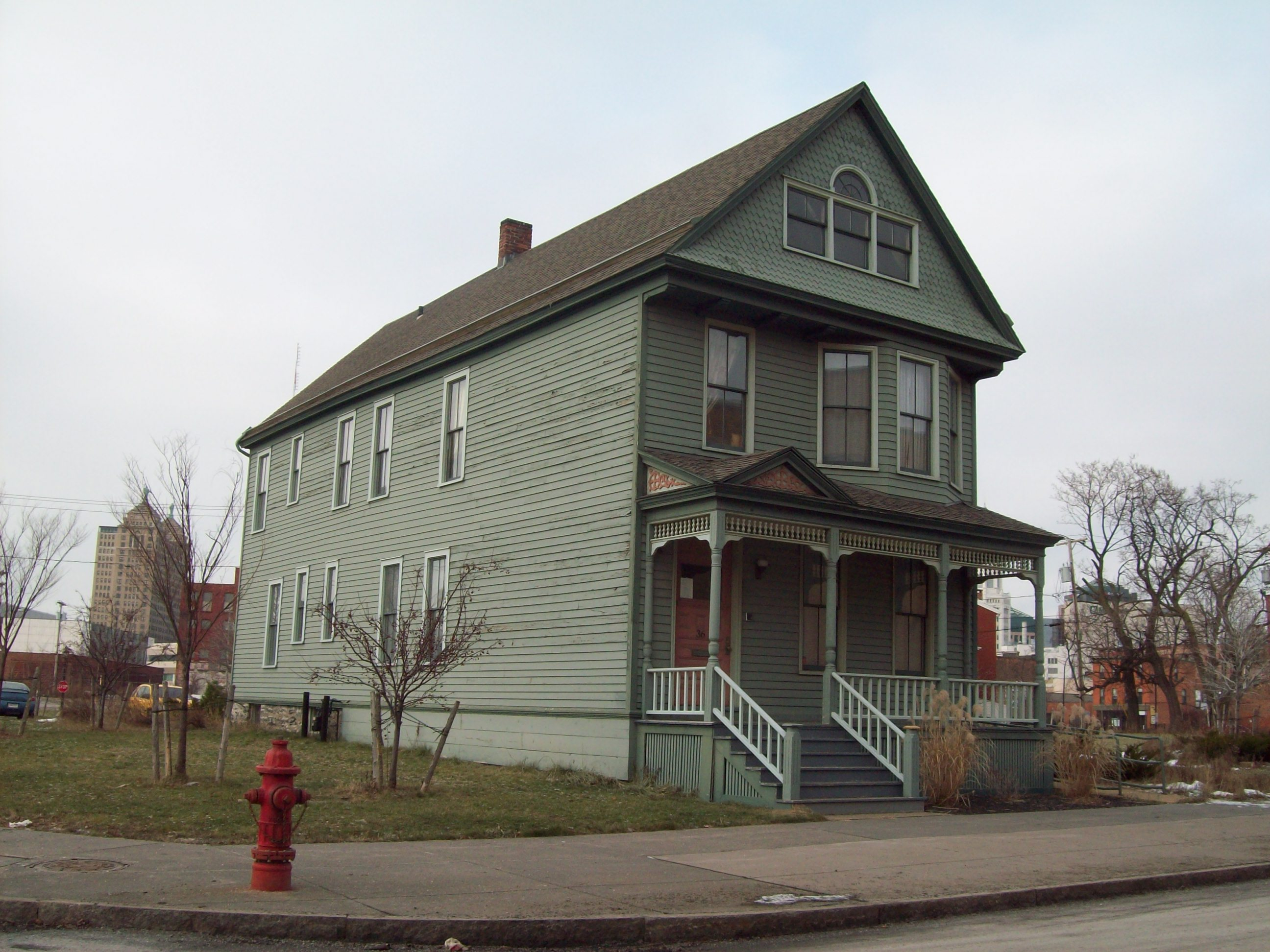
- Rev. J. Edward Nash Sr. House, December 2009

- Location within New York Location within the United States
- Location: 36 Nash St., Buffalo, New York
- Coordinates: 42°53′9″N 78°52′1″W
- Area: 0.1 acres (0.040 ha)
- Architectural style: Queen Anne
- NRHP reference No.: 06001210
- NYSRHP No.: 02940.011842

Significant dates
- Added to NRHP: January 4, 2007
- Designated NYSRHP: November 12, 2006

Rev. J. Edward Nash Sr. House is a historic home located at Buffalo in Erie County, New York. The house was constructed in 1892 and is in the Queen Anne style. It was home to Rev. J. Edward Nash Sr. (1868–1957), a prominent leader in Buffalo's African American community. He served as pastor at the Michigan Avenue Baptist Church from 1892 to 1953. Rev. Nash purchased the frame, two flat home in 1925 and his wife remained in the home until 1987. The house underwent exterior restoration in 2002–2003 and has been designated the Nash House Museum.

It was listed on the National Register of Historic Places in 2007.
