= Evans Ship Canal =

Coordinates: 42°52′46″N 78°52′55″W

The Evans Ship Canal was excavated in Buffalo, New York, from 1832 to 1834.
