= Robert Dunbar =

Scottish mechanical engineer (1812–1890)

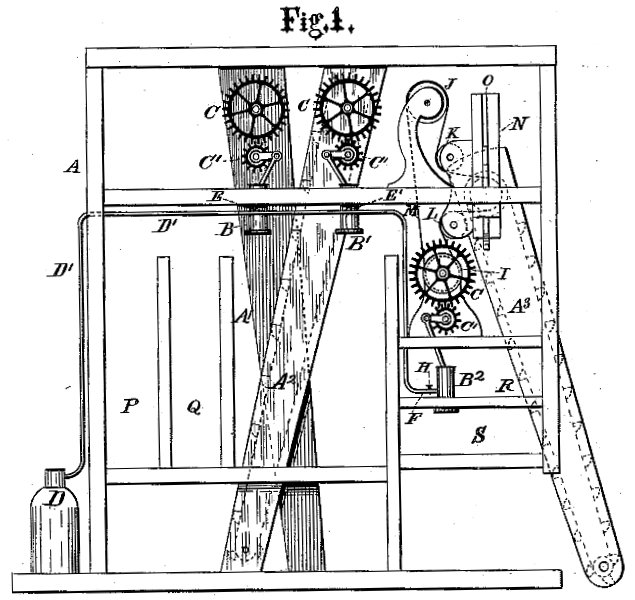
Dunbar patent US226047A for grain elevator improvement invention

Robert Dunbar (13 December 1812 – 18 September 1890) was a Scottish mechanical engineer. He designed the first steam-powered grain elevator in the world and the majority of the first grain elevators in Buffalo, New York City, and Canada.

== Early life ==
Dunbar was born in Carnbee, Scotland. His birth is recorded as 13 December 1812. His father was William Dunbar, a mechanical engineer who came from a family line of engineers. Dunbar immigrated with his family to Pickering, Ontario, while a boy of 12. He went to high school and college in Canada. He took an interest in mechanics and learned mechanical engineering.

== Career ==
Dunbar took charge of the shipyard at Niagara, Ontario, in 1832. He renovated the docks and their machinery. Dunbar later settled in Black Rock, Buffalo, New York, in 1834. He associated himself with Charles W. Evans and constructed flourmills. With financing by entrepreneur Joseph Dart, Dunbar designed and built at Buffalo in 1842 the first steam-powered grain elevator in the world.

The invention had a profound effect on Buffalo and the movement of grains on the Great Lakes and around the world:

The grain elevator developed as a mechanical solution to the problem of raising grain from the lake boats to bulk storage bins, where it remained until being lowered for shipment on canal boats or railroad cars. Less than fifteen years after Joseph Dart's invention of the grain elevator, Buffalo had become the world's largest grain port, surpassing Odessa, Russia; London, England; and Rotterdam, Holland.

He built nearly all the grain elevators in Buffalo, which made the city one of the largest grain markets in the United States. Dunbar built and designed the majority of the first grain elevators in Canada and New York City. He constructed other grain elevators in Liverpool and Hull in England and in Odessa, Russia. He constructed grain elevators in many other grain shipping ports around the world. Dunbar's grain elevator innovations are still in use. Dunbar was a senior partner in a firm called Robert Dunbar & Son. They were grain elevator architects, engineers, and contractors. Dunbar became a wealthy man because of his innovations in grain elevators.

== Family ==
Dunbar married Sarah M. Howell on 26 August 1840. Two of his sons were William J. Dunbar and Robert Dunbar. A third son, George H. Dunbar, became proprietor of the Eagle Iron Works of Buffalo. He also had two daughters, Mary G. Dunbar and Emma G. Dunbar.

== Death ==
Dunbar died 18 September 1890.

== Legacy ==
He is known as "the father of the great grain elevator system."
