= Joseph Dart =

American inventor and engineer

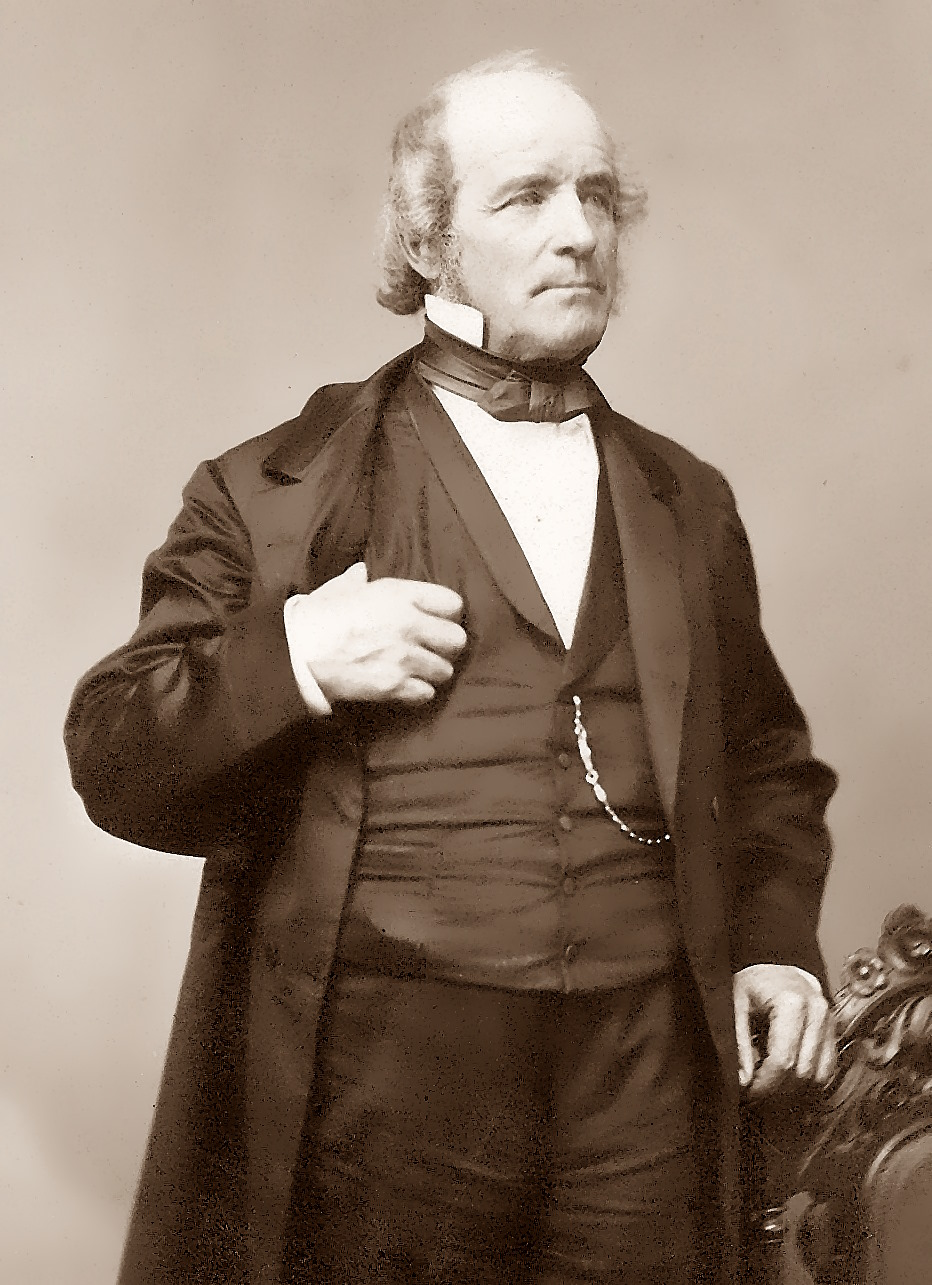
- Joseph Dart, ca 1870
- Born: April 30, 1799; East Hampton, Connecticut, U.S.
- Died: September 28, 1879 (aged 80)
- Resting place: Forest Lawn Cemetery
- Occupations: Businessman, entrepreneur, inventor
- Spouse: Dotha Dennison (m. 1830)
- Children: 7

Joseph Dart (April 30, 1799 – September 28, 1879) was an American businessman and entrepreneur associated with the grain industry. He was well educated and at the age of 17 began an apprenticeship in a hat factory before managing one in 1819. Two years later in 1821, he moved to Buffalo, New York, and in the following year, opened a store trading hats, leather and fur. Among his customers were Native Americans, including Red Jacket. To facilitate communication, he learned the various Iroquoian languages of the local tribes. Dart remained in the trade until just before the panic of 1837, which resulted in a recession and the store collapsing. He shortly after turned his attention towards grain trading.

Dart conceived of a machine-powered grain elevator in 1842, the first in America and known as Dart's Elevator. Other grain elevators were later built that helped make Buffalo a major port city and, within fifteen years, the largest grain shipping port in the world. During his later years, he was a lumber dealer with his brother and was a founding member of the Buffalo Seminary.

Dart married Dotha Dennison in 1830 and had seven children, several of whom died young. He lived in an elegant home during the latter years of his eighty year life, where he and his wife hosted elaborate balls and dinners. He died in September 1879 aged 80, having been described in "very good health" up until his last days.

== Early life ==
Dart was born April 30, 1799, in the town of East Hampton, Connecticut, in the historic district of Middle Haddam. His parents were Joseph and Sarah Dart and he was their third son. Dart received a good education and at the age of 17, moved to Woodbury, Connecticut, where he took work in a hat factory as an apprentice. He moved in 1819 to manage a different hat business in Utica, New York, until 1821.

== Career ==
=== Merchandise trading ===
Dart moved to Buffalo in 1821, then a village of about 1,800 residents. In 1822, he went into the hat, leather and fur business with a man named Joseph Stocking and opened a store at the corner of Main Street and Swan Street in downtown Buffalo. To assist trading with the Native Americans living in the area, Dart learned to speak the Iroquois dialects of the local tribes. He learned to converse with members of the Canadian Six Nations of the Grand River (Iroquois Confederacy), consisting of the Mohawk, Cayuga, Onondaga, Oneida, Seneca and Tuscarora tribes. A biographical note on him is that Native Americans visiting Buffalo were known to entrust their valuables into his care for safekeeping. Someone who did visit his store was Red Jacket, who traded his furs and used the store's iron safe to hold his wampum belt, as it was the strongest safe in the village.

Dart remained in the hat and fur trading business until 1836, the year following the death of Stocking in 1835, although other sources indicate he stayed in the industry until 1837. He sold the business to Stocking's son, Thomas R. Stocking. During the panic of 1837 which caused a deep recession and high rates of unemployment, Dart's former store was affected and ultimately closed. By this time, Dart had turned his focus to the trade of grain through the city's harbour.

=== Grain Elevators ===
It seemed to me, as I reflected on the amazing extent of the grain producing regions of the Prairie West, and the favorable position of Buffalo for receiving their products, that the eastward movements of grain through this port would soon exceed anything the boldest imagination had conceived.

— Reflection of Joseph Dart.

Around four years after Dart arrived in Buffalo, the Erie Canal was fully completed in 1825 at 353 miles (568 km) long. Dart, who was considered to be "a methodical and industrious man", turned his attention to the grain trading industry, identifying Buffalo's favourable position as a grain trading port on the canal. Since the 1830s, he observed how the trading of grain had increased and considered that the volume of grain moving through Buffalo towards the east could reach unimaginable levels. He believed that the increase in trade required facilities capable of meeting the demand. Buffalo was well positioned, with its location on the Great Lakes as the furthest east affording it a geographical advantage. In 1841, he came up with the idea of using machinery to transfer grain from ships and in the following year, a steam-powered grain elevator was built.

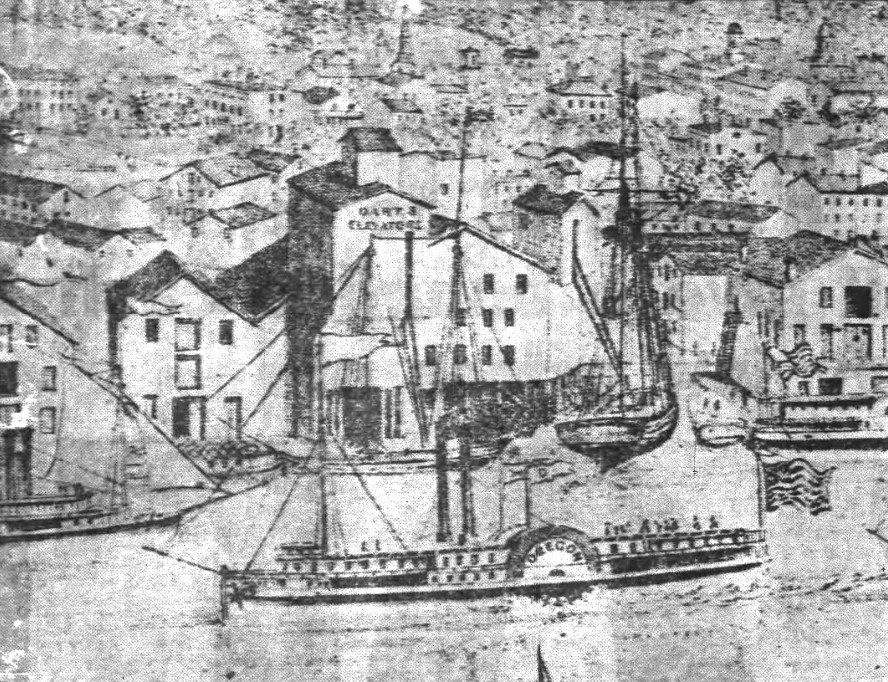
Drawing of the original Dart Elevator

Alongside Scottish mechanical engineer Robert Dunbar, Dart oversaw construction of a steam-powered grain elevator, the first in America, dedicating around 10 years of his life to the business. Dunbar had moved to Buffalo in 1834 following a period of mechanical engineering study in Canada. Up to this time, grains were in barrels or sacks and moved by hand. The elevator was built on the bank of the Buffalo River where it meets the Evans Ship Canal and constructed with wood, in contrast to contemporary concrete elevators. The principles used by Dart were not dissimilar to those used by Delaware's flour mills, utilizing conveyor belts powered by a steam engine, which Dart described as being "a simple apparatus".

Dart attributed credit to inventor Oliver Evans, who conceived the original idea of an elevator fifty years before. Dart faced numerous challenges during construction, with some predictions it would not succeed. Among those believing his elevator would not be viable was Mahlon Kingman, a forwarding merchant, who took pity at Dart's efforts while expressing his opinion that there was no cheaper alternative to manual labor, although he later admitted that he "did not know it all". Dart's elevator opened in June 1843 and in its first year of operation, 229,260 bushels of grain were unloaded. In contrast, by 1888, the amount of grain handled by the Western Elevating Company exceeded 85 million bushels.

==== Legacy ====
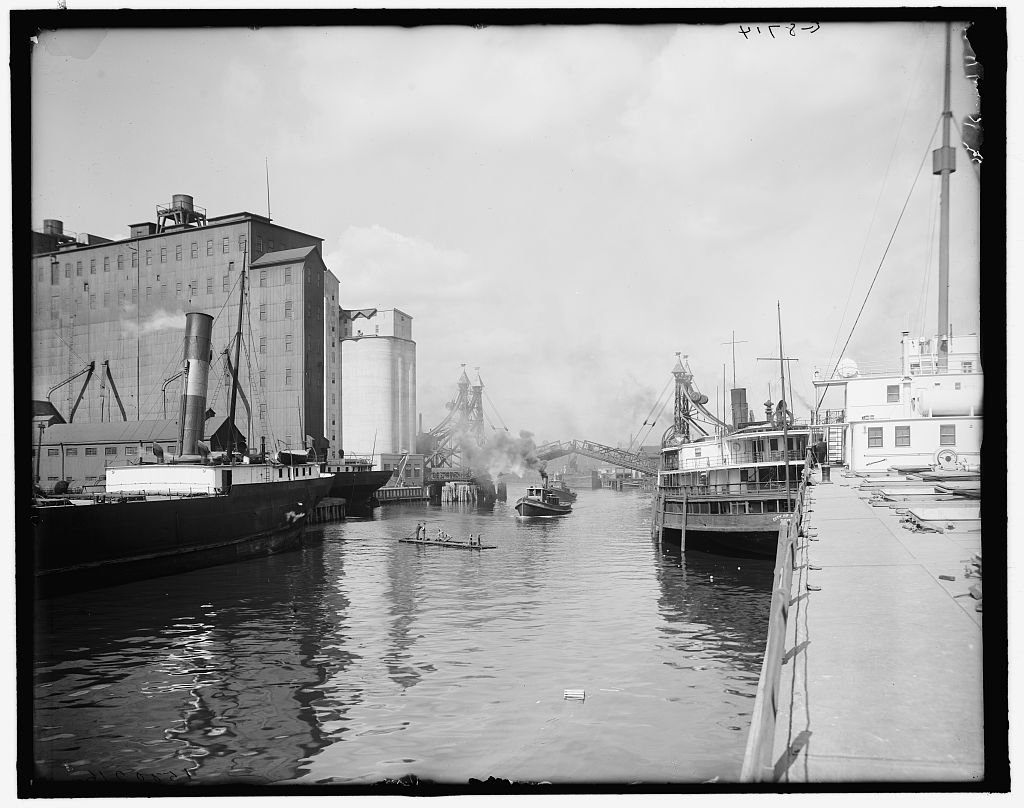
Grain elevators in Buffalo during early 20th century

In 1863, Dart's grain elevator burned down and was replaced by what became known as "The Bennett Elevator", built on the same site. The conception of the grain elevator in Buffalo made it what was believed to be the largest grain trading port in the world, a feat it achieved prior to the American Civil War. The grain elevator Dart introduced to Buffalo helped it progress from a small village to among the most prosperous during the 19th century. Within fifteen years of construction, Buffalo had ten elevators, making it the world's largest grain shipping port, overtaking cities such as London in England and Rotterdam in Holland.

By 1887, Buffalo had 43 grain elevators worth around $8,000,000 (equivalent to $251,055,961 in 2025) that could transfer 4,000,000 grain bushels daily. Dart's grain elevator invention was considered state of the art by The Buffalo Commercial newspaper at the end of the nineteenth century, which was regarded as "second in importance [to commerce] only to the steamboat and the locomotive".

=== Businesses and societies ===
In 1852, Dart became a lumber dealer with his brother Erastus and brother-in-law William H. Ovington. Dart's son Joseph joined his father in the lumber industry after graduating from Yale University in 1874. Ovington withdrew in 1861, after which the business was known as Dart & Bro. He helped establish the Buffalo Water Works and was a founding member of the Buffalo Seminary, as well as a member of the Buffalo Historical Society. A reader of The Buffalo Commercial wrote in 1879 that Dart was a director of a bank in Conneaut, Ohio, of whom his brother, a judge, was the president.

== Personal life ==
Dart married Dotha Dennison (b. July 31, 1809) of Norfolk, Connecticut, in 1830 and had seven children; however, several died while still young. Other sources suggest they had only six children, with three dying in youth. He took considerable interest in local political affairs, although he never held any political office. Dart was described as being a kind, Christian gentleman with integrity and was well respected by those who associated with him.

Dart bought a grand house on the north-east corner of Niagara Street and Georgia Street in 1858 where he lived until his death. The house was built around 1854 and described as a "large and imposing dwelling" with an exterior composed of plain squares of stone. Dart's mansion later became a boarding house and was demolished around 1915 to give way to apartments and commercial development.

== Death and legacy ==
On September 28, 1879, Dart died at the age of eighty. Up to a week prior to his death, he was described as being in "very good health" and had spent most of the year visiting friends in the east of the country. He was survived by three children, Joseph Dart Jr and two daughters. His remains are buried in Buffalo's Forest Lawn Cemetery.

Dart lived long enough to witness the improved and more substantial elevators built years after his initial one, after "setting the pace" in advancing grain transport between the east and west. His innovations are associated with his name being remembered as bringing advancements in the Buffalo region.

== Sources ==
- Baxter, Henry H. (1980). Grain Elevators. Adventures in Western New York History. Vol. 26. Buffalo and Erie County Historical Society. ASIN B0006EAECY.
- Dixon, Laurinda S.; Chu, Petra ten-Doesschate (2008). Twenty-first-century Perspectives on Nineteenth-century Art: Essays in Honor of Gabriel P. Weisberg. Associated University Presses. ISBN 978-0-87413-011-9. in "'As ugly a monster as has yet been produced': Buffalo's Nineteenth-Century Grain Elevators" essay, by Francis R. Kowsky.
- Jackson, Bruce (2016). Buffalo's Waterfront Grain Elevators. State University of New York Press. ISBN 9781438462592.
- Mingus, Nancy (2021). Buffalo Business Pioneers: Innovation in the Nickel City. History Press. ISBN 9781467146685.
- Moss, Laura-Eve; Eisenstadt, Peter (2005). The Encyclopedia of New York State. Syracuse University Press. ISBN 9780815608080. In "Buffalo" entry, by William H. Siener.
- Smith, Henry (1884). History of the City of Buffalo and Erie County. Mason & Company. OCLC 170247.
