= Timeline of Queens =

The following is a timeline of the history of the borough of Queens in New York City, New York, U.S.

== Prior to 20th century ==
- 1657 – Flushing Remonstrance
- 1683 – Queens County created.
- 1790 – Population: 16,014.
- 1821 - Horse racing track opens.
- 1858 - First all-star baseball game and first games in which admission is charged takes place in Corona at the old Fashion Race Course.
- 1860 – Population: 57,391.
- 1870 – Population: 73,803.
- 1880 – Population: 90,574.
- 1889 – BMT Myrtle Avenue Line begins operating.
- 1890 – Population: 128,059.
- 1898 – January 1: Queens is established as a borough in the City of Greater New York. The borough consists of only part of the previous boundaries of Queens County; Nassau County is established in the remaining part.

== 20th century ==
=== 1900s–1940s ===
- 1900
  - King Manor Museum founded in Jamaica.
  - Population: 152,999.
- 1909 – March 30: Queensboro Bridge opens.
- 1910
  - September 8: East River Tunnels open.
  - Population: 284,041.
- 1911 – Queens Chamber of Commerce established.
- 1912 – Chapin Home for the Aging active.
- 1914 – Murray Hill Theatre opens in Flushing.
- 1915 – US Open tennis tournament relocates to Queens.
- 1916 – November 16: Queensboro Plaza station opens.
- 1920 – Population: 469,042.
- 1928 – The 7 Train reaches Flushing
- 1930
  - August 4: King Kullen grocery supermarket in business.
  - Population: 1,079,129.
- 1933 – IND Crosstown Line begins operating.
- 1936 – Triborough Bridge built.
- 1939
  - April 29: Bronx–Whitestone Bridge built.
  - April 30: 1939 New York World's Fair opens.
- 1940
  - November 15: Queens–Midtown Tunnel opens.
  - Beacon Theater opens in Long Island City.
  - Population: 1,297,634.
- 1941 – Strand Theatre opens in Astoria.

=== 1950s–1990s ===
- 1950 – Population: 1,550,849.
- 1953 – Queens Symphony Orchestra formed.
- 1960 – Population: 1,809,578.
- 1963
  - The revised (1963) New York City Charter creates community boards within each borough.
  - May 15: Weight Watchers founded.
- 1964
  - April 17: Shea Stadium opens, bringing Major League Baseball and the National Football League to Queens with the New York Mets and the New York Jets.
  - April 22: 1964 New York World's Fair opens.
- 1968 – Queens Historical Society founded.
- 1969 – Mets win the World Series for the first time.
- 1970 – Flushing Tribune (now Queens Tribune) newspaper in publication.
- 1976
  - Afrikan Poetry Theatre founded.
  - Son of Sam serial killings take place over a year in Flushing, Bellerose, and Forest Hills.
- 1983
  - Silvercup Studios in business.
  - Gary Ackerman becomes U.S. representative for New York's 7th congressional district.
- 1985 – Greater Astoria Historical Society founded.
- 1986 – Mets win their second World Series.
- 1990
  - Citicorp Building constructed, at the time the tallest building between Manhattan and Boston.
  - Population: 1,951,598.
- 1993 – New York Hospital Queens active.
- 1996 – Energy Brands, maker of Vitamin Water, established in Whitestone.
- 1997 – Arthur Ashe Stadium opens, home to the US Open tennis tournament.
- 1998 – Gregory Meeks becomes U.S. representative for New York's 6th congressional district.

== 21st century ==
=== 2000s–2010s ===
- 2000 – Population: 2,229,379.
- 2001
  - November 12: American Airlines Flight 587 crashed.
  - Astoria Performing Arts Center established.
- 2007 – Newtown Historical Society formed.
- 2010
  - March 10: Jose Peralta, of Jackson Heights became the first Dominican-American to be elected to the New York State Senate.
  - June: Queens Memory Project begins.
  - Population: 2,230,722.
- 2013
  - Grace Meng becomes U.S. representative for New York's 6th congressional district.
  - The graffiti wall 5 Pointz in Long Island City falls prey to redevelopment and is torn down without any opportunity to preserve the artwork.
- 2014
  - October 23: 2014 Queens hatchet attack.
  - Melinda Katz becomes borough president.
- 2017 - January 20: Jamaica, Queens born Donald Trump becomes the 45th President of the United States.
- 2019 - February 14: After being awarded one of the two new headquarter locations for Amazon, the company announced it was withdrawing its plans to establish a presence in Long Island City, and with this withdrawal the prospect of 25,000 new jobs.

=== 2020s ===
- 2020
  - December 14: Sandra Lindsay, a Registered nurse at Long Island Jewish Medical Center, became the first recipient of the first dosage of the then only Emergency Use Authorization (EUA) approved COVID-19 vaccine – the Pfizer–BioNTech COVID-19 vaccine.
  - Population: 2,405,464.
- 2021
  - January 4: Nurse Sandra Lindsay, received her second and final dosage of a EUA approved COVID-19 vaccine. With the second dosage, she is expected to have a 95% immunity to COVID-19.
  - February 10: Citi Field is converted into a COVID-19 vaccination "mega-site" operated by the City of New York.

== See also ==
- Queens directories
- Queens history
- National Register of Historic Places in Queens County, New York
- List of New York City Designated Landmarks in Queens
- List of streetcar lines in Queens
- List of New York City Subway stations in Queens
- List of Queens borough presidents
- List of Queens neighborhoods
- Neighborhood histories: Astoria, Bayside, College Point, Corona, Douglaston, Elmhurst, Flushing, Glendale, Jamaica, Long Island City, Maspeth, Ridgewood, Rockaway, Whitestone, Woodhaven, Woodside, etc.

other NYC boroughs

- Timeline of Brooklyn
- Timeline of the Bronx
- Timeline of Staten Island
- Timeline of New York City – a timeline inclusive of both Greater New York City and Manhattan history.

== Bibliography ==
Published in the 19th century

- Franklin B. Hough (1872), "Queens County", Gazetteer of the State of New York, Albany, N.Y: Andrew Boyd, OCLC 18450990 – via Internet Archive
- History of Queens County, New York. Munsell. 1882.
- Trow's Business Directory of the Borough of Queens. NY: Trow. 1899. + Register

Published in the 20th century

- Federal Writers' Project (1939). "Queens". New York City Guide. American Guide Series. New York: Random House. hdl:2027/mdp.39015008975883 – via HathiTrust.
- Mary A. Glascock. An Annotated Bibliography of the History of Queens County, New York (Queens College, 1977) 218 pages
- Janet E. Lieberman and Richard K. Lieberman. City Limits: A Social History of Queens (Kendall/Hunt Publishing Company, 1983)
- Vincent F. Seyfried; William Asadorian (1991). Old Queens, N.Y., in Early Photographs. Dover. ISBN 978-0-486-26358-8.

Published in the 21st century

- Jeffrey A. Kroessler (2002), New York Year by Year: A Chronology of the Great Metropolis, New York University Press, ISBN 0-8147-4751-5
- "Resources". A Walk Through Queens. Educational Broadcasting Corporation. 2004. (includes "History" section)
- Claudia Gryvatz Copquin (2007). The Neighborhoods of Queens. Yale University Press. ISBN 978-0-300-11299-3.
- Brendan McGovern and John W. Frazier (2015). "Evolving Ethnic Settlements in Queens: Historical and Current Forces Reshaping Human Geography". Focus on Geography (58).
