= 1843 National Convention of Colored Citizens =

African American convention in Buffalo, New York

The National Convention of Colored Citizens was held August 15–19, 1843 at the Park Presbyterian Church in Buffalo, New York. Similar to previous colored conventions, the convention of 1843 was an assembly for African American citizens to discuss the organized efforts of the anti-slavery movement. The convention included individuals and delegates from various states and cities. Henry Highland Garnet and Samuel H. Davis delivered key speeches. Delegates deliberated courses of action and voted upon resolutions to further anti-slavery efforts and to help African Americans.

== Background ==
National colored conventions were organized to discuss changes in approaching anti-slavery actions and movements and to combine efforts between various African American groups that were spread throughout the northern states. Colored Conventions were held in the early 1830s, but efforts to combine groups in places like New York and Philadelphia became increasingly difficult due to the differing approaches to combating slavery. The Liberty Party in 1840 advanced abolitionist movements through political action and more formal forms of persuasion.

In 1841, former convention heads and leaders from Philadelphia proposed a revival of the conventions and planned for a meeting with black representatives from the surrounding states. However, white protests instigated a riot that blocked all conventions and assemblies that had been planned for that time.

Two years later, in 1843, black leaders—different from those of past conventions—stepped up to assemble on behalf of black Americans. Although groups disagreed on how to combat slavery, they were united by a common goal in which they were "...Against TWO of the greatest evils ever inflicted upon an innocent and inoffensive people - slavery and prejudice."

The location and time of the convention were agreed upon during a preliminary meeting held May 9–10, 1843. They also wrote and sent out a call for colored citizens to attend.

== Convention proceedings ==
The 1843 National Colored Convention was held in Buffalo, New York, August 15–19. The National Convention included delegates from Maine, Massachusetts, Connecticut, New York, Ohio, Michigan, Illinois, Virginia, North Carolina, and Georgia.

Each session opened with a prayer given by a minister. The appointed chair started the meeting by calling roll and reading the minutes from the previous session. During the course of the convention, committees were generally appointed by the head chairman. Committees were formed to create reports that were read to the attendees. Delegates voted on the adoption of these reports and the adoption of resolutions. Thirty numbered resolutions were voted upon with almost all of them passing. Various other resolutions, including 15 parliamentary rules, were passed for the administration of the convention.

In addition to the sessions, evening meetings were held, in which delegates from the convention addressed the general public.

== Issues discussed at the convention ==
During the Colored Convention, committees were created to discuss such issues as the condition of colored people, the mechanical arts, agriculture, and the press. A statistical report was created reporting on the number of colored people, their professions, and their holdings. Colored citizens were encouraged to learn mechanic arts because it created opportunities for influence. In addition, it was concluded that there are broad benefits to agriculture and that colored people in cities should be encouraged to move to farms. It was also resolved that a weekly newspaper should be created in support of the people's freedom. These ideas included in the committee reports were supported by the convention.

The condition of colored people was a main subject for the convention. It was concluded that American colonization, although it had initial good intent, actually hindered freedom. In particular, corrupt missionary work was condemned. The convention stressed the importance of education for colored children, and it was determined of vital importance for colored people who were citizens to vote.

Additionally, the convention argued for the support of the Liberty party. There was disagreement, as some attendees were opposed to the idea of pledging their vote to any political party. The support of the formation of The Freeman party was also argued but was controversial because some thought they should not support both the Liberty and the Freeman party. Ultimately, both resolutions passed.

Some of the more controversial issues were:

=== Address to slaves ===
Resolution no. 10 was a resolution dealing with a potential address to slaves. This was one of the most heavily discussed and controversial resolutions. In the end, it did not pass. Henry Garnet and Frederick Douglass had different points of view: Henry Garnet's speech advocated for slaves to up rise against their masters, whereas Frederick Douglass countered that peaceful methods were the best solution. When the address was written, it met with a lot of resistance. One of the arguments against the address was that it would endanger free black citizens, and the motion to move forward was rejected. After further discussion, the motion was again rejected, but only by one vote. In a later session, a revote was called. President Amos G. Beman spoke out against the address on moral grounds, stating that it advocated violence. The address was voted on a third time and was rejected indefinitely.

=== Support of the church ===
Another major discussion was over resolution no. 1 which dealt with the support of the church. Frederick Douglass suggested that the word “Christian” be added to the resolution. While most of the delegates were supportive of religion, various members of the convention did not support the existing Christian church. Some thought that the church was too corrupt to be reformed. Others believed that abandoning the church would prevent any reform from happening at all. Eventually, the original resolution in support of the church passed. The word “Christian” was not added.

== Key figures ==
Several individuals presided over the convention's proceedings.

=== Samuel H. Davis ===
The convention chairman was Samuel H. Davis. Davis gave the keynote address at the convention and opened up the discussions and speeches.

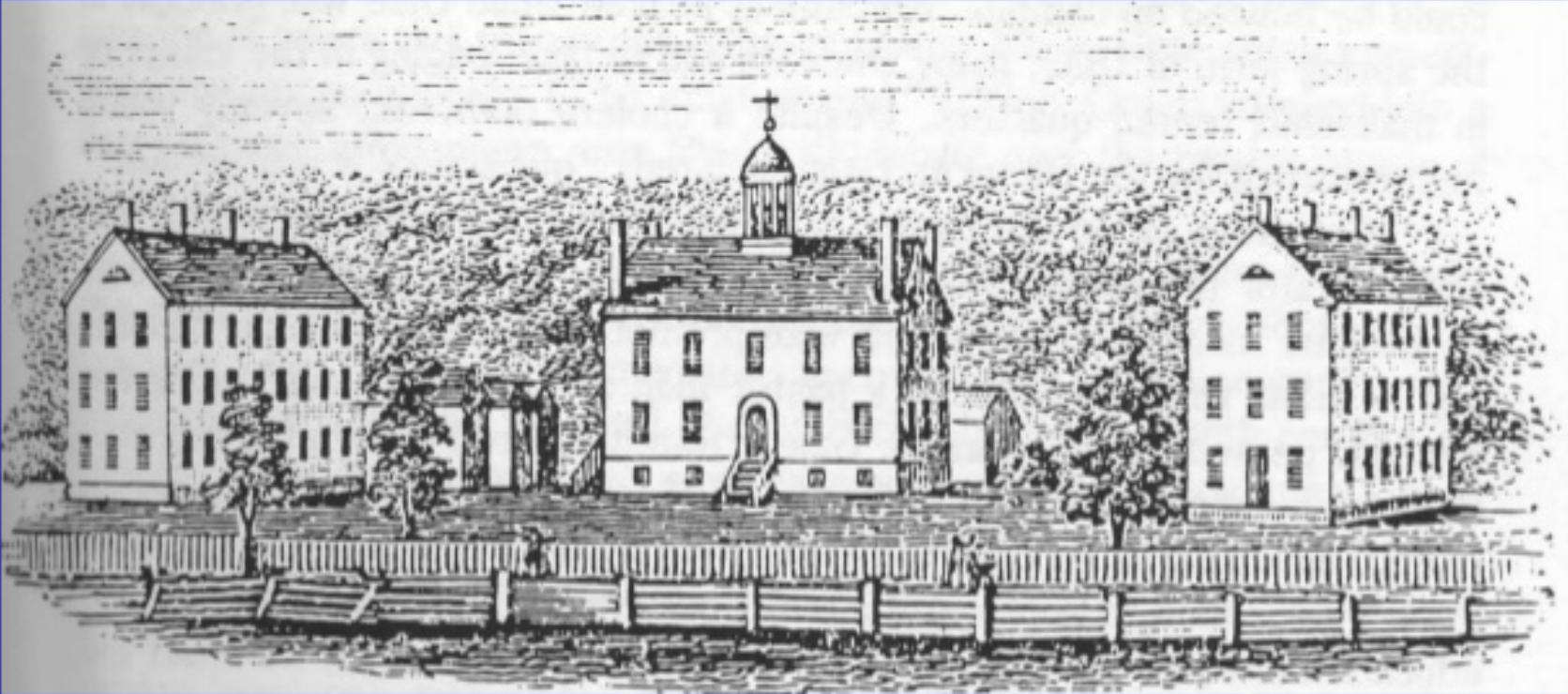
Oneida Theological Institute

=== Henry Garnet ===
A key speaker during the convention was Rev. Henry Highland Garnet. Garnet grew up having been born into slavery and escaping to Maryland with his family to an area where slavery was less tolerated. In Maryland, he was able to attend school uninterrupted until adulthood. At 21 years old and already well educated, Garnet entered the Presbyterian school of the Oneida Institute to study religion. In 1834, Garnet and other students founded the first anti-slavery society in New York. They began holding assemblies and gatherings and pursued interests in serious anti-slavery movements. The Emancipator and Free American paper described Garnet as "Guided by the will of Heaven, and impelled by the highest motives that man can be susceptible of." In 1843, Garnet was ordained and became a pastor of Liberty Street Presbyterian Church. He often struggled to balance his religious duties and his work in anti-slavery movements. In comparison to his peers, he held more radical and straightforward views on approaches to end slavery and to fight for equality.

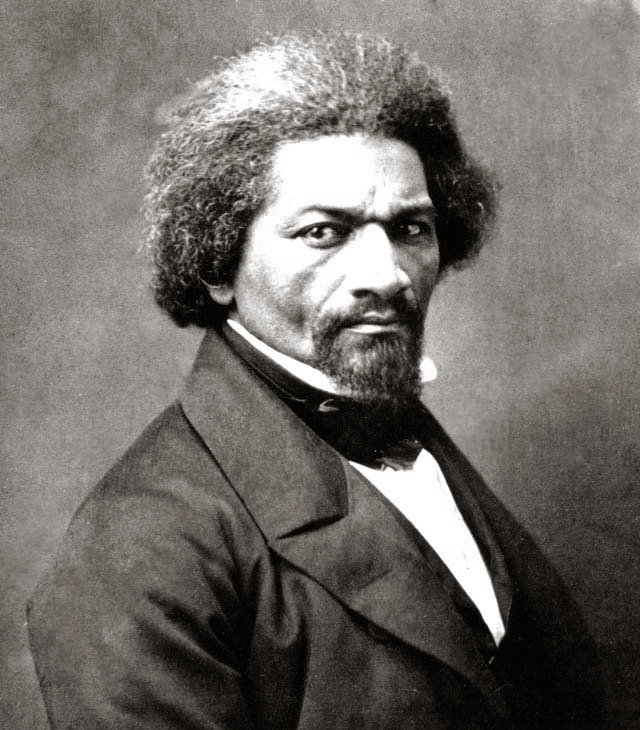
Frederick Douglass, c. 1866

=== Frederick Douglass ===
Frederick Douglass, a notable participant and budding abolitionist, was one of the vice presidents of the convention. He served as the delegate for Massachusetts and was on the committee for resolution 10. Unlike Henry Garnet, Frederick Douglass argued against the use of physical force

== Speeches ==
=== Samuel Davis ===
Samuel Davis gave the keynote address and set the convention in motion. Davis' speech aimed to unify convention participants and their strategies; he emphasized that the main goal of all black citizens should be to "make known our wrongs to the world and our oppressors." Davis said that the movement to free the African American people should be led by African Americans. He stated that "Two objects should distinctly and constantly be borne in mind, in all our deliberations. One is the diffusion of truth and the other the elevation of our own people. By diffusion of truth, I mean that we must take a bold and elevated stand for the truth."

Davis called upon all attending to expand their reach to become more politically aligned with popular parties and people that would accept them and help their cause. He explained that appealing to the government for rights was a hollow attempt. Continuing the speech, Davis explained the importance of fighting for the rights of all black citizens and securing happiness wherever they settle or congregate. He said that few states recognized any rights for blacks and that members of the convention should work tenaciously to secure an elective franchise in areas they are denied and were currently subordinate to oppressive law. Davis ended his speech with a plea for attendees to unite and combine their efforts despite their differing views and factions.

=== Henry Highland Garnet ===
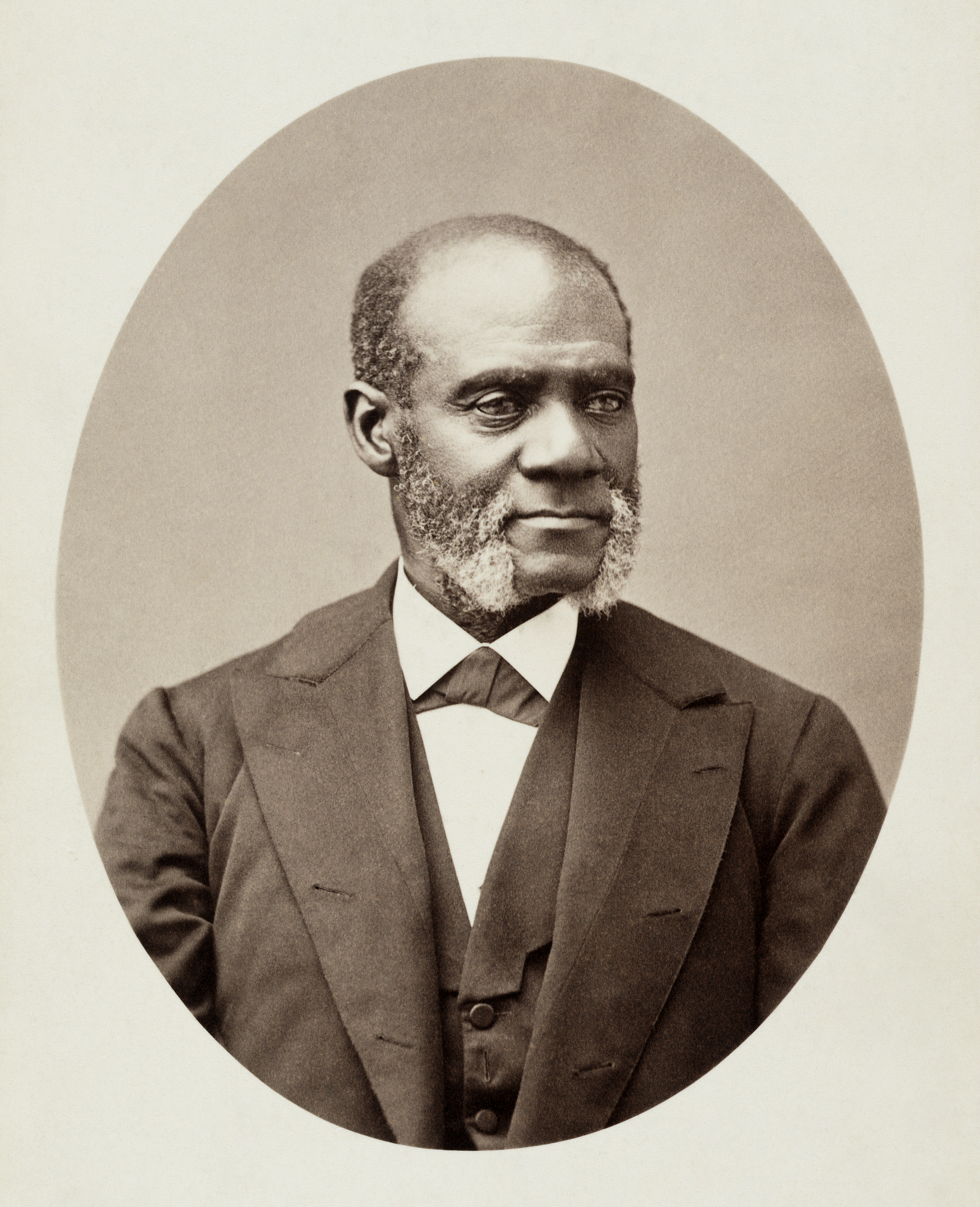
Henry Highland Garnet

Henry Highland Garnet gave a powerful speech most commonly known as the "Address to the Slaves of the United States" which was regarded widely as a call to arms and violence for the cause of freedom. This fiery address to this assembly of African Americans was meant to stoke the coals of emotion. He stirred the audience by recounting the ongoing and historical suffering of slavery and oppression. Garnet set a precedent by publicly and directly addressing slaves with these topics. This had not occurred in previous conventions in which white supervision was required. This was a reason for the ill and more timid attempts that called for change in earlier assemblies and conventions. Garnet began the speech with a beacon of hope, saying that God was on their side and was guiding their efforts. Garnet spoke about the slave-owners’ waning authority and the black citizen's growing opportunity. He reminded them of how slave-owners, proclaiming Christianity, captured their ancestors and brought them across the ocean where they had no future or prospects of an enjoyable and free life. He declared that this nation, founded in the pursuit of freedom, would one day face the wrath of God and the disgust of other civilized nations because of its hypocrisy and inconsistency in denying others the same liberties.

"Nearly three millions of your fellow-citizens are prohibited by law and public opinion, (which in this country is stronger than law) from reading the Book of Life. Your intellect has been destroyed as much as possible, and every ray of light they have attempted to shut out from your minds."

Garnet explained that a slave's submission and adherence to their masters made them unable to fully worship God, whom their masters claimed to believe and follow. He further explained that slavery and oppression acted as a roadblock to African Americans partaking in God's blessings and the freedoms they inherited at birth: the inalienable rights at the very roots and foundation of this country. He stated that God views men and women as equals and are by nature free spirits.

As Garnet continued his speech, he changed gears to address the actions which he believed necessary to liberate slaves. The only way forward, Garnet claimed, was through violence— treating slave owners and captors with the same intensity that slaves had experienced. Garnet's vision for freeing slaves included a short-term antidote of violent actions and a widespread refusal to work. Of this, he exclaimed: "You cannot be more oppressed than you have been; you cannot suffer greater cruelties than you have already. Rather die freemen than live to be slaves. Remember that you are three millions!"

Garnet concluded his speech proposing that the motto for slaves and free Blacks alike should be a resounding cry of 'Resistance!' against their oppressors. He added that no slave or bondsmen ever became free without resistance.

== Impact ==
The Colored Convention of 1843 was the first successful national convention since that held in 1835, and it reestablished the pattern of regular conventions, increasing the opportunities for political and social discussions. It helped unite colored people in support of anti-slavery and actions towards freedom.

A newspaper clipping of The Liberator

The militant nature of Henry Garnet's speech was surprising for many slaves and abolitionist leaders. This speech made Henry Garnet a controversial and well-known abolitionist. His speech influenced subsequent colored conventions and anti-slavery literature to increase calls for action, especially to slaves. The speech was written about in several black newspapers, including The Liberator and The North Star. The Liberator wrote, "Rev. H.H. Garnet introduced... advice to this effect: that the slave was to go to his master, tell of the injustice of slavery." Garnet's speech became known as his “call to rebellion” and was later published by Garnet in 1848.
