= D'Youville University =

Catholic college in Buffalo, New York, US

Coordinates: 42°54′9″N 78°53′27″W

- Former name: D'Youville College (1908–2022)
- Motto: Religio et Scientia
- Motto in English: Religion and Knowledge
- Type: Private college
- Established: 1908; 118 years ago
- Religious affiliation: Catholic Church (Grey Nuns)
- Academic affiliations: CIC; ACCU
- Endowment: US $49.6 Million
- President: Lorrie A. Clemo
- Provost: Natalia F. Blank (Vice President for Academic Affairs)
- Faculty: 147 full time, 145 part time
- Students: 2,893 (fall 2025)
- Undergraduates: 1,326 (fall 2025)
- Postgraduates: 1,567 (fall 2025)
- Location: Buffalo, New York, United States
- Campus: 27 acres (11 ha)
- Colors
- Nickname: Saints
- Sporting affiliations: NCAA Division II – ECC
- Mascot: Saint Bernard
- Website: dyu.edu
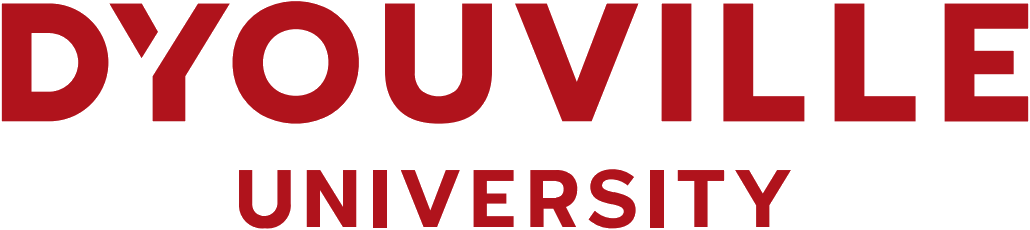

D'Youville University (D'Youville or DYU) is a private university in Buffalo, New York, United States. It was founded as D'Youville College in 1908 and named by the Grey Nuns after the patroness saint Marie-Marguerite d'Youville. As of fall 2022, the university offers 54 degree majors in the health sciences, business, and liberal arts for undergraduate and graduate students. In February 2022, the New York State Board of Regents approved a name change to D'Youville University.

== Campus ==
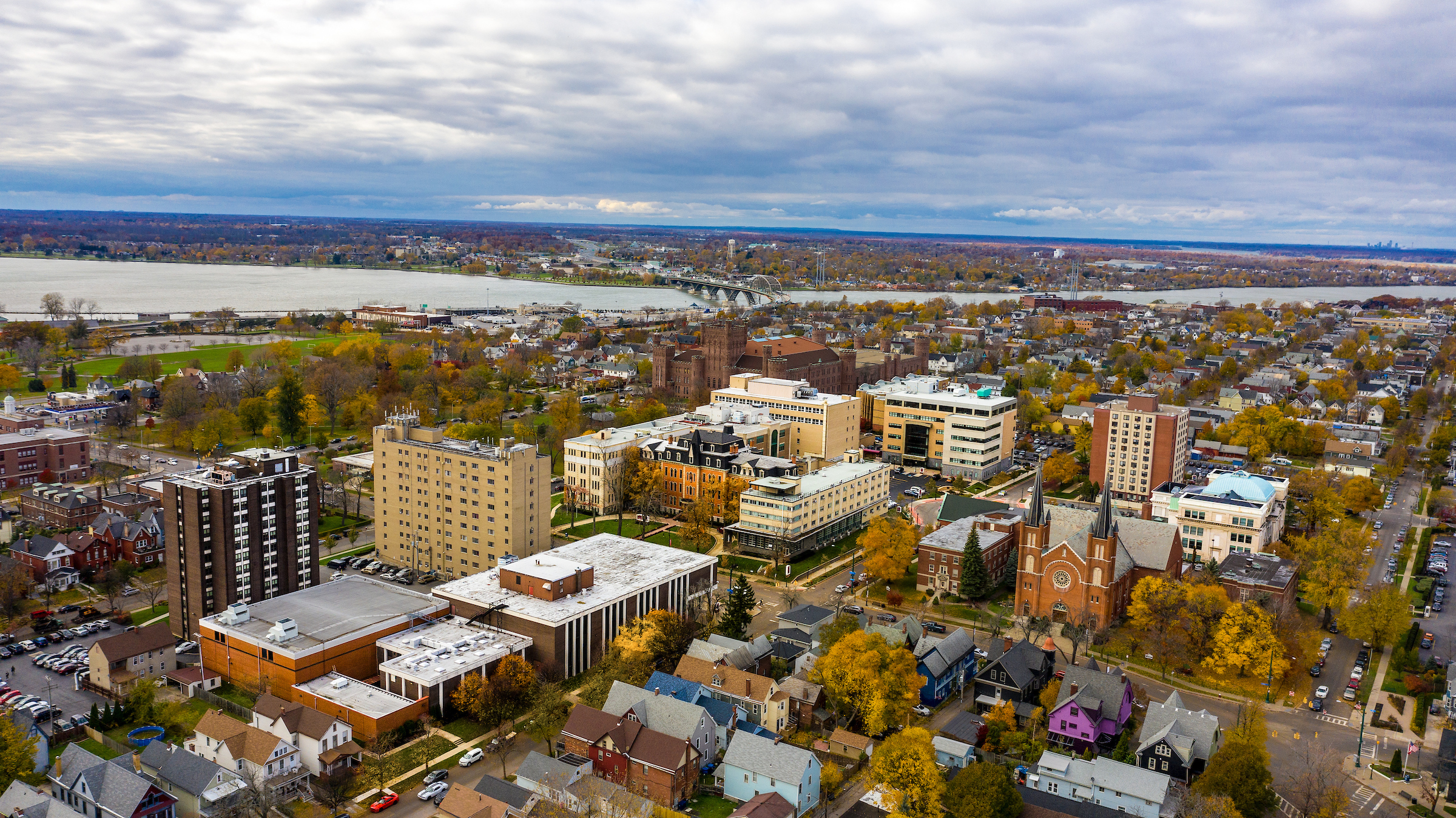
2018 aerial looking toward Peace Bridge

Located in Western New York on the Lower West Side of the City of Buffalo, the campus is in an urban setting a few blocks from the Peace Bridge on the Canadian border. The campus has 15 buildings with classrooms, laboratories, residential and athletics facilities. There are two student housing buildings and one outdoor athletics complex.

D'Youville is on Porter Ave, one of seven parkways in the Buffalo Olmsted Park System. The Park System was designed by Frederick Law Olmsted and Calvert Vaux in 1868, ten years after designing Central Park in New York City.

CannonDesign was retained to develop D'Youville's most recent campus Master Plan and the major priorities of that planning effort are focused toward revitalizing the campus in ways that improve its connection to the Buffalo Olmsted Park System, as well as beautifying the Lower West Side of Buffalo and improving the connectivity and traffic flow through the local neighborhoods. Prior campus planning has also been conducted in collaboration with Stiegliz Snyder Architecture and University at Buffalo's Department of Urban and Regional Planning.

== History ==
=== Immigration ===
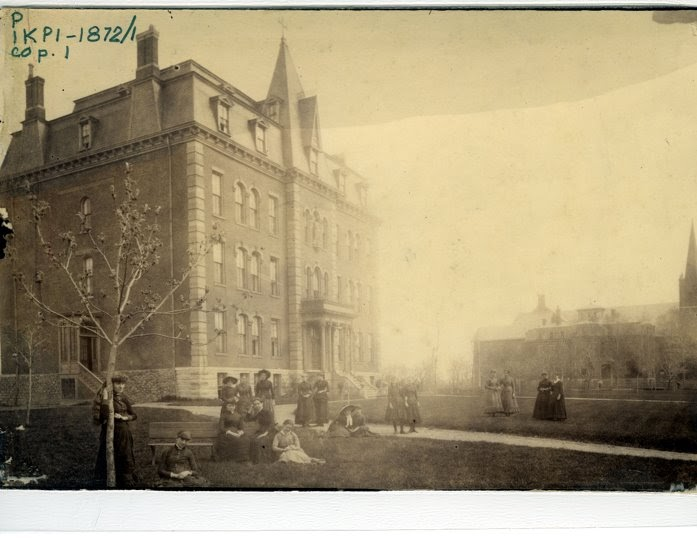
1872: first Administration Building

Marie-Marguerite d'Youville was born in Quebec; she married François d'Youville in 1722 and had six children. Following the death of François, Marguerite was left to raise two young children, after burying her father, her husband, and four of their children. Her desire to serve those in need went against the social conventions of Marguerite's generation, leading her and three other women to establish the Sisters of Charity in 1737—a service-oriented organization commonly known as the Grey Nuns. The Sisters of Charity committed themselves to fighting for the rights of the most marginalized of society in Canada. After 1840, the order rapidly expanded, and over the next 100 years became a major provider of health care and other social services throughout Quebec, Western and Northern Canada, and the northern United States.

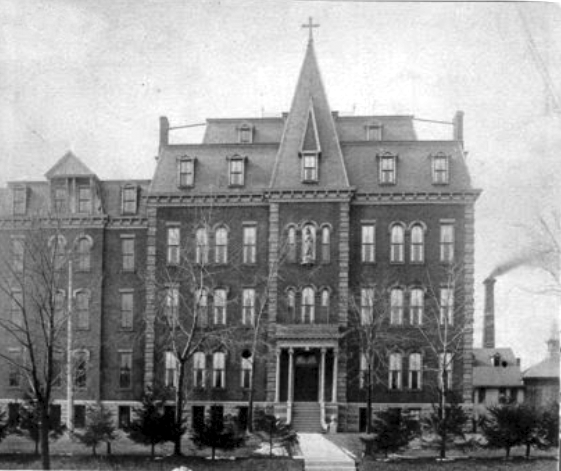
1887: first wing added

Following an invitation from the Oblates of Mary Immaculate (O.M.I.), the Grey Nuns moved from Canada to Buffalo, New York in October 1857. Initially, the Grey Nuns lived in a six-room convent when they opened the Holy Angels School. The school's first official building was the Koessler Administration Building, which was built in 1872 but not dedicated and named as such until 2003. The Koessler Administration Building was expanded three times to meet the growing needs of the Grey Nuns. First, east and west wing expansions were constructed in the last 1800s. Then, the Prospect Ave wing was added in 1907.

=== Incorporation ===
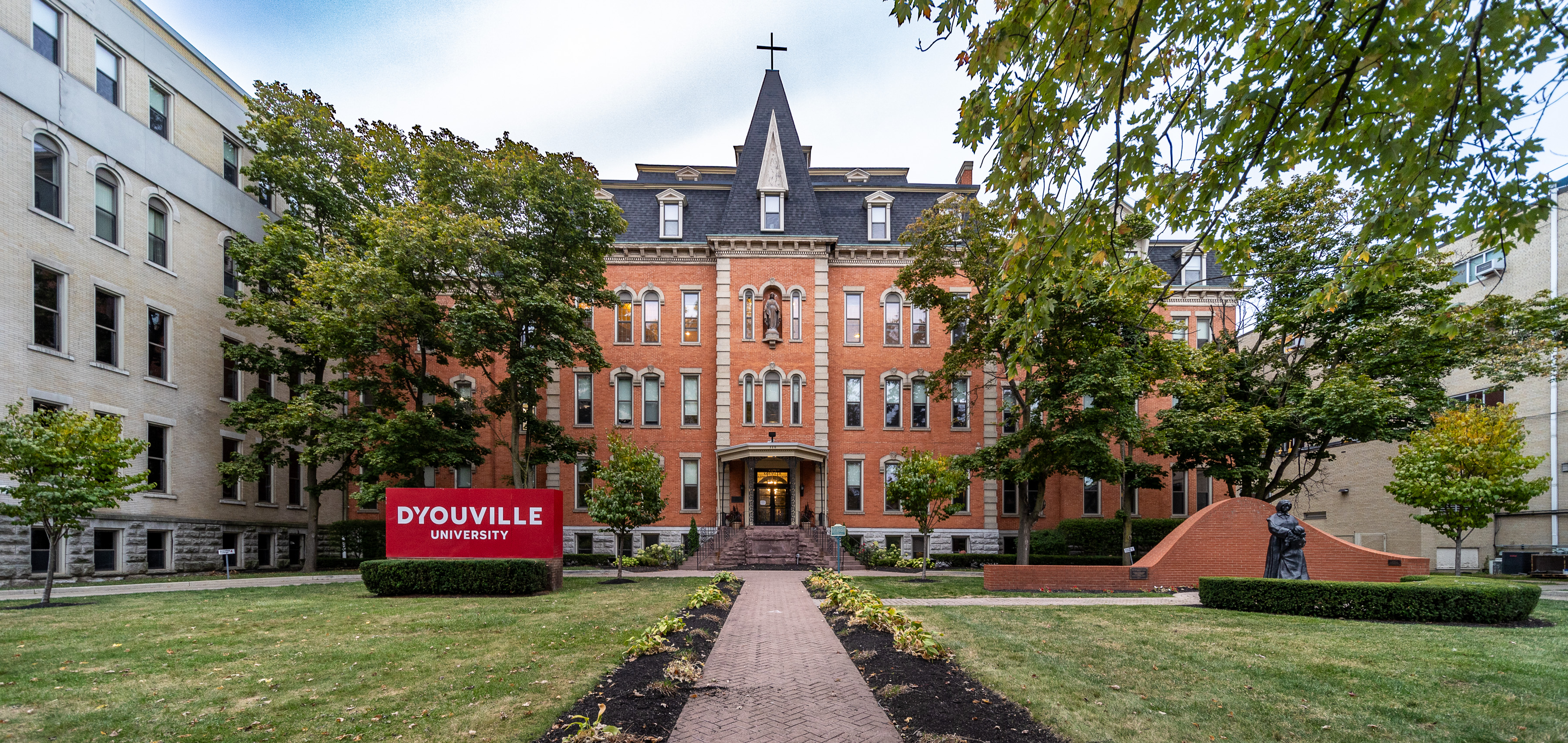
Koessler Administration Building

D'Youville was founded as an all-girls Roman Catholic school. The institution was incorporated and filed in the Secretary of State's Office on February 13, 1865, under the name, "The Holy Angels Infirmary Academy and Industrial School for Benevolent, Charitable, and Scientific Purposes". The New York State Legislature granted a charter to become a college on April 8, 1908, being accredited by the University of the State of New York. This initial charter was amended to change the name of incorporation to "D'Youville College," after the patroness Saint Marie-Marguerite d'Youville. D'Youville was initially founded as an institution focused on education and the liberal arts, with particular emphasis on women, students of immigrant status, and populations that lived in under-resourced communities. In February 2022, the "D'Youville College" charter was amended again to become "D'Youville University."

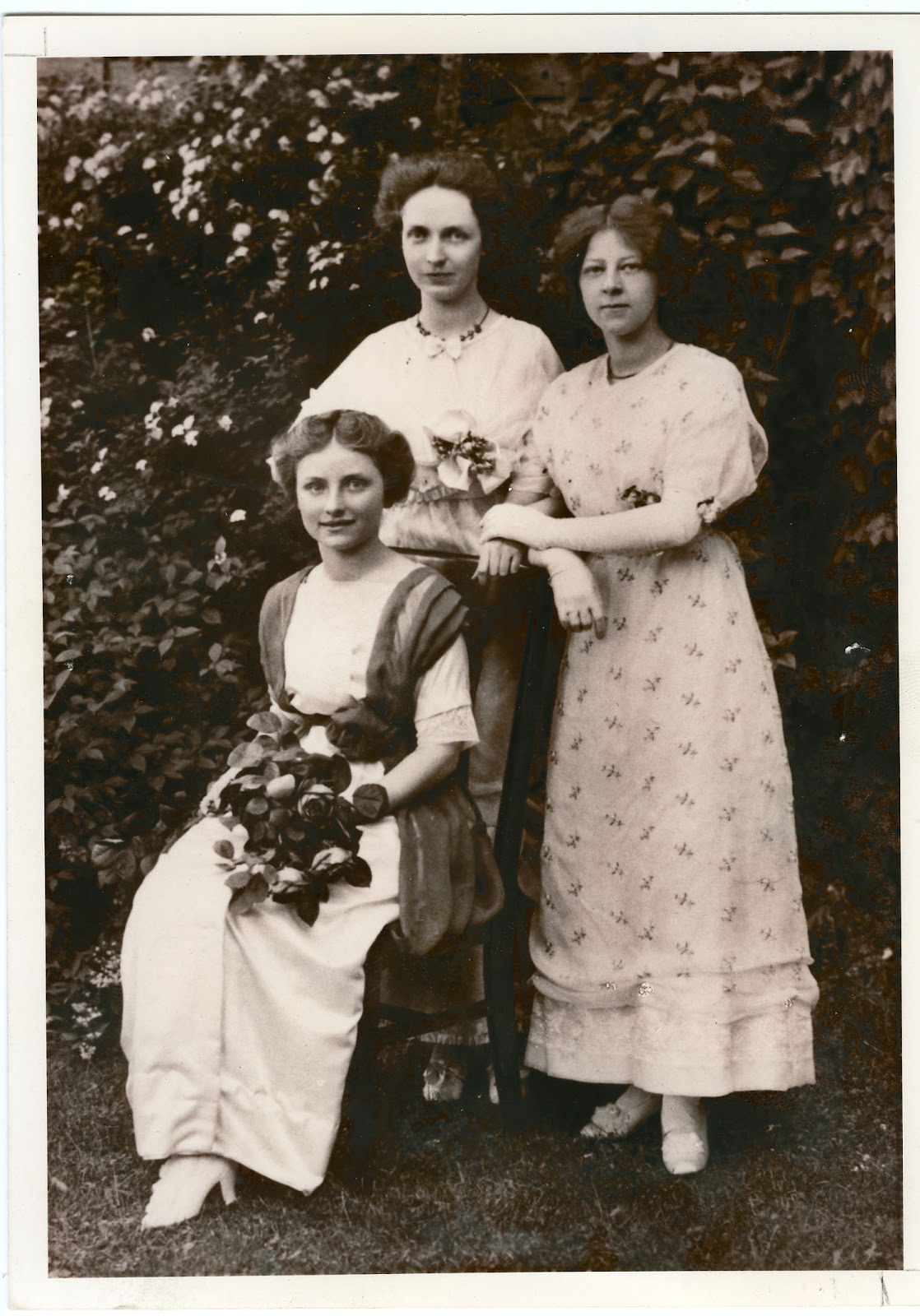
1912: first graduating class

On May 12, 1912, D'Youville conferred three Bachelor of Arts degrees to Mary Brennen, Pauline Garnett, and Elizabeth Gosselin, one Master of Arts degree to Helena Sheehan, and one honorary Doctor of Music degree to Elizabeth Cronin. Mary Brennan, of the first graduating class of D'Youville wrote the following to describe D'Youville at the time of her graduation:

The popular opinion was that girls' schools were completely impractical, a little sewing, a little painting, some music, enough English and history to enhance your conversation and social graces. D'Youville was far from such. Each girl was given the opportunity to fit herself for the business world, to be a well-educated helpmate as wife and mother. There were excellent courses in languages, in science, mathematics and history taught by superior professors...certainly none in sewing or etiquette.

Over the next several decades objectives of study emphasized the teaching professions and intellectual interests guided students toward extra-curricular activities focusing on dance, music, drama, language, and political debate. The entire student body was 37 in 1912, then enrollment grew from 104 to around 400 students at the end of the 1940s. As the United States entered into WWII, D'Youville expanded its educational focus to include nursing programs and became the first college to offer baccalaureate degree programs for women in Western New York. Student enrollment continued to grow steadily though the mid-century period. At the same time the population of Buffalo, New York approached its peak of approximately 580,000 people.

=== Mid-century expansion ===
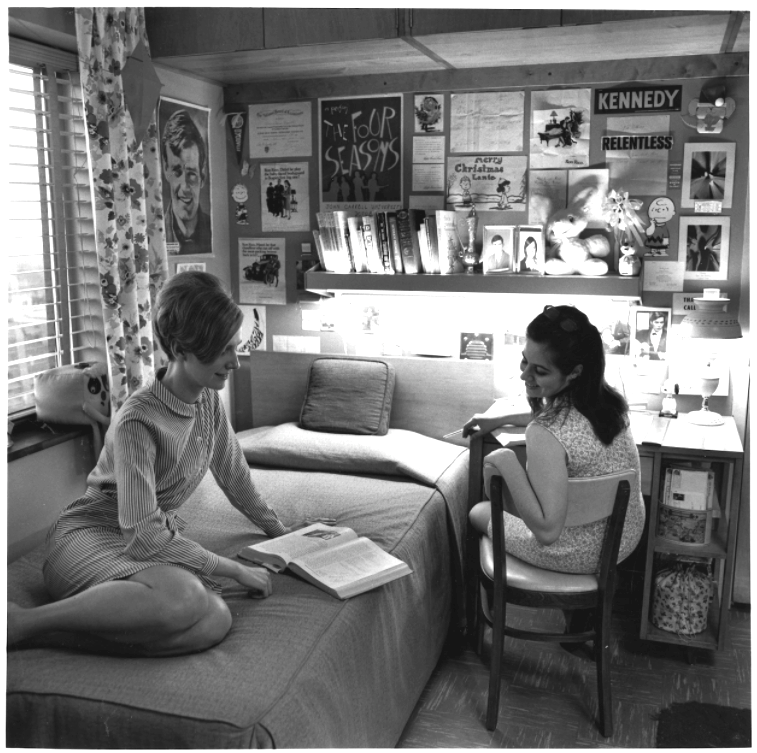
1968: residents in their dorm

As the U.S. economy bounced back from the great depression in the 1950s, D'Youville's enrollment began increasing and stimulated need for a larger campus. As a result of D'Youville's growth during the late 1950s and 1960s, many of the campus buildings possess a mid-century architectural style.

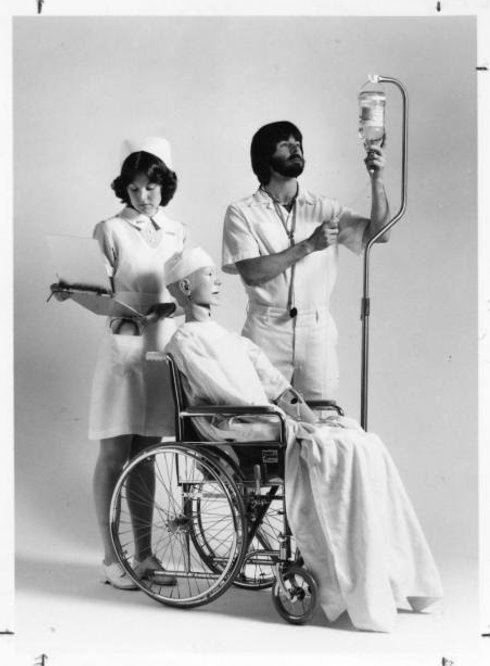
1971: first male nurse

Six campus buildings were erected between 1956 and 1969, largely driven by the vision and fundraising of Sister Francis Xavier Lynch. The original campus library building was built in 1956. Madonna Hall was built in 1959. Mary Agnes Hall was built in 1964. The Health Science Building was erected in 1966 and is currently referred to as the Dr. Pauline M. Alt Building. The College Center and Gymnasium were constructed in 1969. Marguerite Hall was also constructed in 1969.

D'Youville remained a women's college until 1970, men started being admitted in 1971.

The transition to co-ed was controversial and met with resistance at the time, however, the change was necessary to navigate enrollment declines as many other regional institutions had already transitioned to co-ed before D'Youville. The financial difficulties surrounding the enrollment decline necessitated the sale of Mary Agnes Hall less than 10 years after it was built, which has since been operated as Mary Agnus Manor, an adult assisted living facility. The purchase of an old laundry mat building adjacent to campus in 1978 was the first evidence that D'Youville's financial situation had stabilized following the co-ed transition.

In 1984, President Ronald Reagan spoke at D'Youville during a campaign event with the Italian and Polish communities near the end of his first term in office after participating in the dedication of the Santa Maria Towers. This event is referenced as the only visit that President Reagan ever made to Buffalo, New York, and as a result, a memorial service with residents and community leaders was also held at D'Youville 20 years later when he died in 2004.

=== 21st-century growth ===
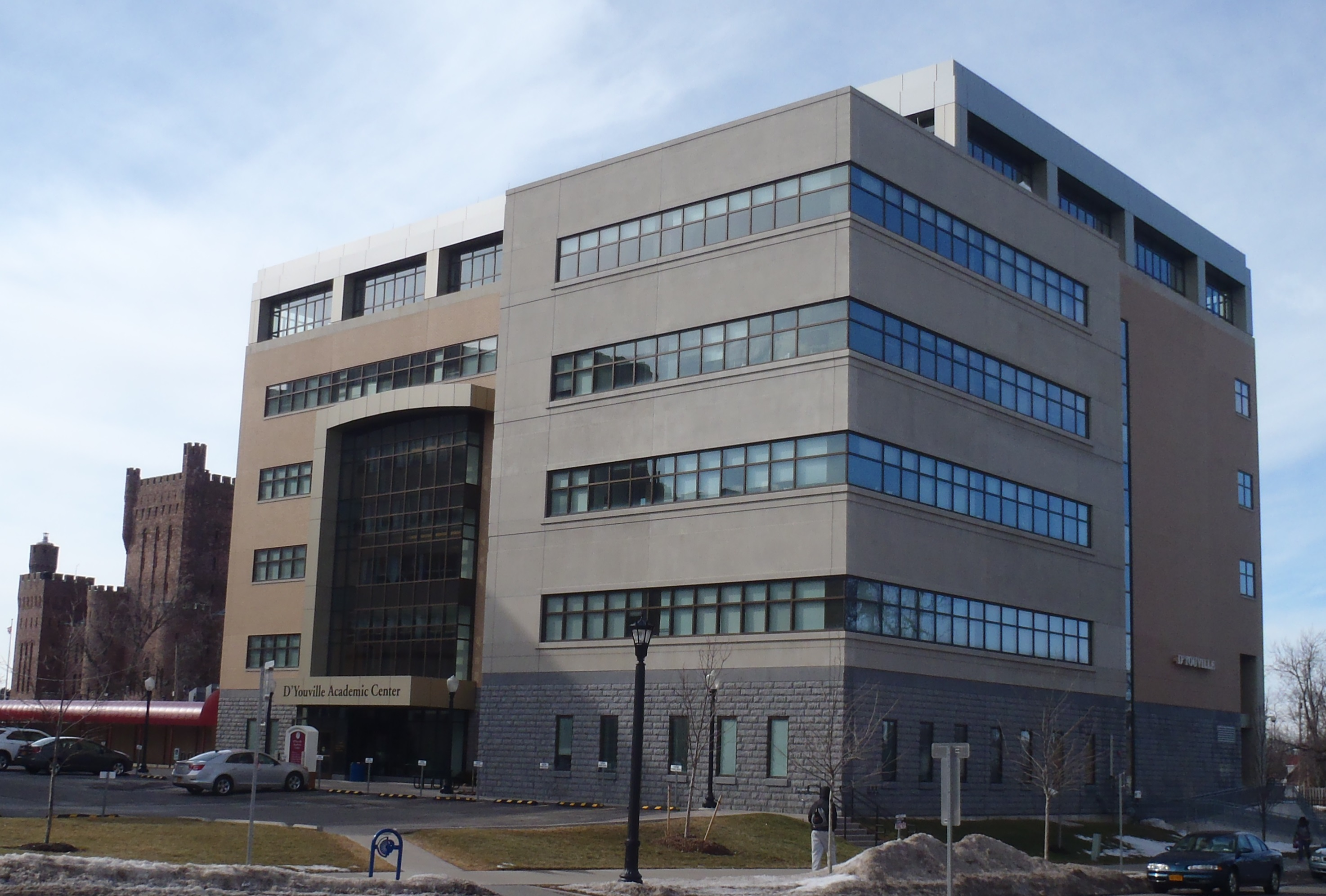
2014: D'Youville Academic Center

A second period of stability and growth occurred around the turn of the century, largely driven by the growing number of Canadian students attracted by a favorable currency exchange rate. D'Youville enrollment growth was also attributed to the addition of masters and professional health professions degree programs in the 1980s, which expanded the institution's focus beyond a liberal arts college. This natural evolution progressed in the early 2000s with the addition of several doctoral degree programs. These major academic changes began the vision of becoming a university, which was formalized by a 2007 board of trustees vote directing administration to request New York State Education Department's approval for D'Youville to be changed from college to university. The pursuit of 'university status' was achieved in February 2022.

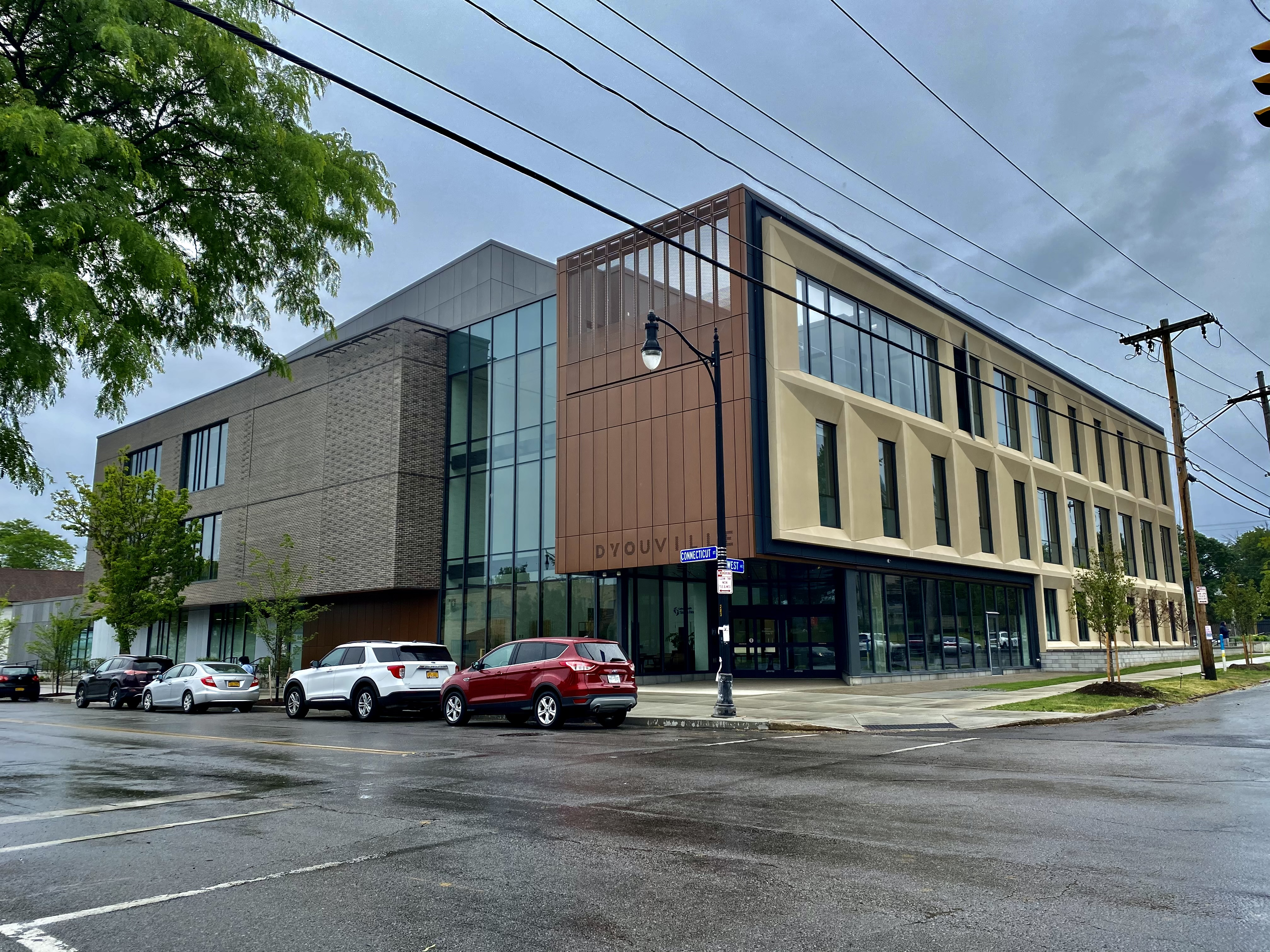
2021: D'Youville Health Professions Hub

Renovation and new construction added six buildings between 1999 and 2015. In 1999, D'Youville renovated the Holy Angels School building, built in 1905, to become the Montante Family Library. D'Youville's original library building was demolished in 2000, and the Bauer Family Academic Center was built to replace it in 2001. The 222 Connecticut Street Apartment Complex was built in 2005. The D'Youville Academic Center was built in 2010. The Dobson Athletic Complex and the Dr. Charles and Mary Schweitzer Bauer School of Arts, Science and Education were built in 2015.

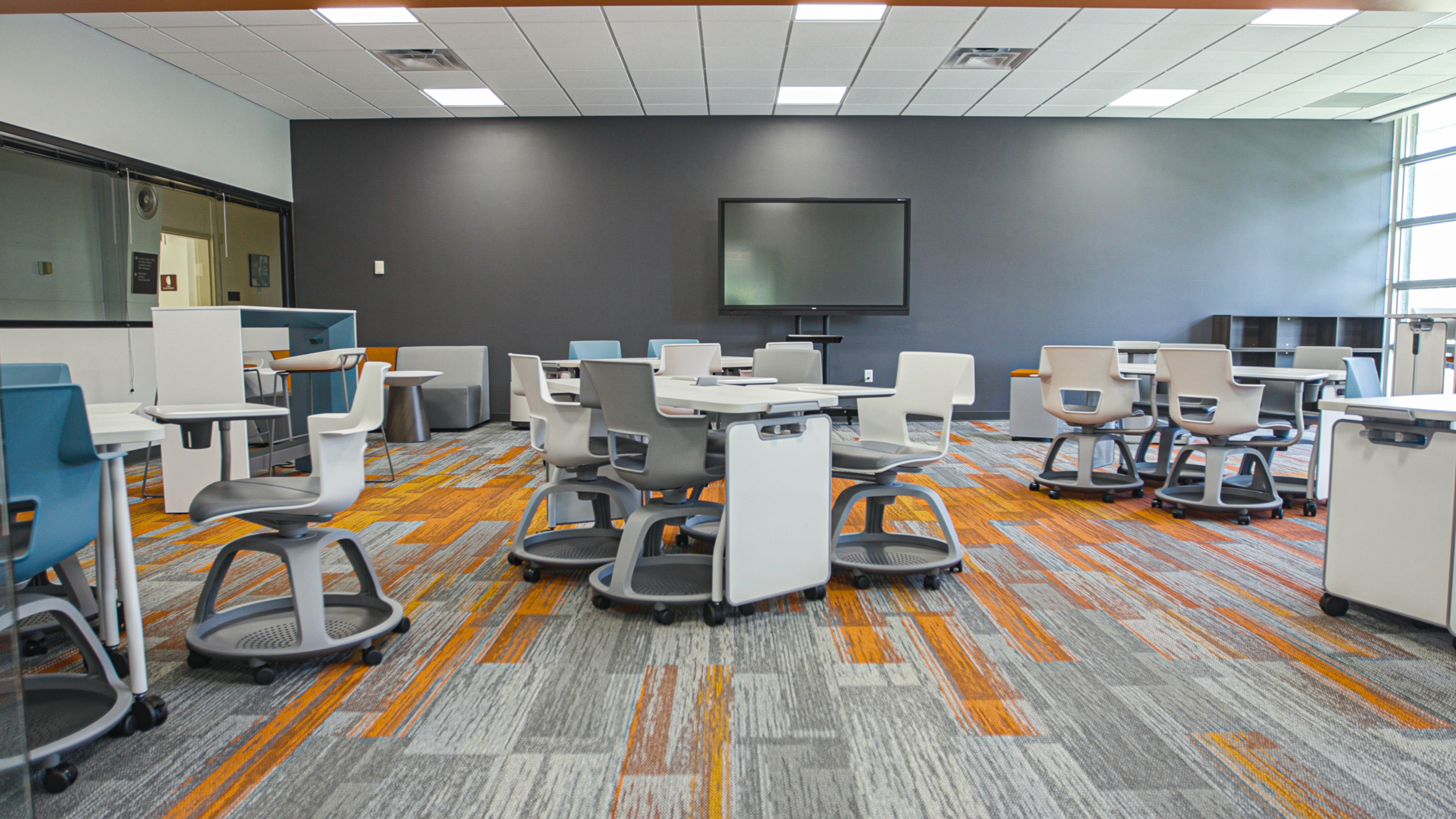
2021: Steelcase Active Learning Classroom

=== Recent developments ===
In 2020, D'Youville purchased the Holy Angels Church, Rectory, and Convent, which was adjacent to the campus. The university opened a Health Professions Hub building in June 2021, which includes an inter-professional clinic and laboratory, pharmacy, rehabilitation gym, simulation labs, dietetics kitchen, and events space. D'Youville is also in process of a larger campus renovation plan, including student service centers, the renovation of active learning classrooms, student residence halls and dining hall renovations, the Kavinoky Theater and the Koessler Administration Building. Renovations to the 4th and 5th floors on the Koessler Administration Building were recognized with the Buffalo Business First Collegiate Brick-by-Brick award in 2021. The Health Profession Hub was recognized by the American Institute of Architects (AIA) Buffalo/Western New York with the 2021 highest design honor award. The school was designated as a university in February, 2022.

In 2024, the university featured an AI robot, Sophia, as its commencement speaker.

== Organization ==
List of D'Youville Presidents
	President Name	Years of service
1	Sister St. Stanislaus Burns	1908–1911; 1913–16
2	Sister Mary Augustine O'Leary	1911–1913
3	Sister Mary Ursula Quigley	1916–1919
4	Sister Verecunda Quinn	1919–1924
5	Sister Mary Kilwan	1924–1929
6	Sister St. Edward Coonly	1929–1934
7	Sister Grace Wechter	1934–1947
8	Sister Jane Frances Cabana	1947–1949
9	Sister Margaret Dooling	1949–1954
10	Sister Regina Marie Curry	1954–1959
11	Sister Catherine Mahoney	1959–1962
12	Sister Francis Xavier Lynch	1962–1968
13	Sister Mary Charlotte Barton	1968–1979
14	Sister Denise Roche	1979–2016
15	Dr. Lorrie Clemo	2017–Present

D'Youville is a non-profit organization with $69.5 million (2018) in expenses that is governed by a 22-member board of trustees. Five of the trustees are elected as officers, including the president of the university. Board members typically serve three 3-year terms.

In July 2016, Sister Denise Roche stepped down from serving as D'Youville president for 36 years and was succeeded by interim President William Mariani. In December 2016 the Board of Trustees appointed Lorrie Clemo to become the next president. Clemo officially began her appointment in January 2017 as the 15th President of D'Youville and as the first lay president to lead the institution.

The president works with an administrative cabinet called the president's council. D'Youville also has a faculty senate, a student government association, and an alumni board. The academic departments of the university are organized into 4 academic schools led by deans, including the Patricia H. Garman School of Nursing, School of Health Professions, School of Pharmacy, and School of Science, Arts and Education.

In 2022, D'Youville University announced it was shifting the staff and administration of the organization to a 32-hour, 4-day workweek. Prior to this change the institution was working 37.5 hours workweeks. The shift to a 4-day workweek started as a 6 month trial technology driven health and wellness initiative, and was then made permanent.

== Academics ==
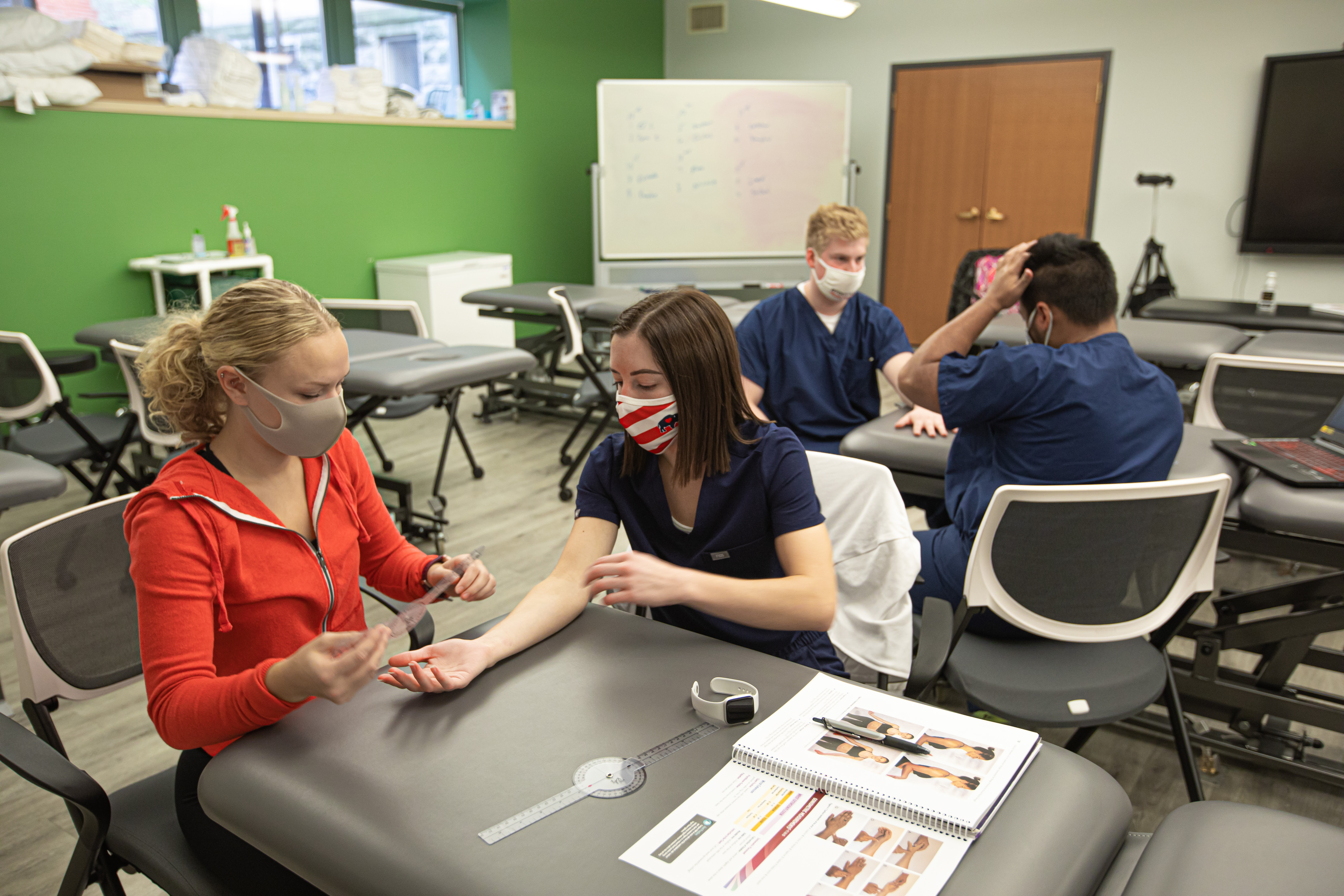
Students in an occupational therapy lab

D'Youville is classified among "Doctoral/Professional Universities" and is accredited by the Middle States Commission on Higher Education. In 2020, U.S. News & World Report moved D'Youville's classification from "Regional Universities – North" to "National Universities" due to D'Youville's range of undergraduate, master's, and doctoral programs.

Race/Ethnicity of Student Body (Fall 2020)
	Undergrad	U.S. Census
White	64%	60.1%
Asian	8%	5.9%
Black	10%	13.4%
Hispanic/Latino	6%	18.5%
Native American	1%	1.3%
Other/International	10%	N/A

=== Demographics ===
The university enrolls roughly 3,000 students (53% undergraduate, 47% graduate). Approximately 17% of students live on campus and the gender distribution of the student body is 75% female to 25% male. The student-faculty ratio is 10:1 and 31% of students receive income-based federal Pell grants. International students come from 40 different countries and make up 15% of the student body. In 2019, there were 153 service members and veterans receiving some type of tuition assistance, which is equal to approximately 5% of the student body.

=== Admissions ===
D'Youville is a test optional institution which does not require the submission of standardized test scores as part of their comprehensive evaluation of applicants. D'Youville has $16 million in merit-based scholarships, annually. In 2019, D'Youville agreed to unlimited Say Yes to Education scholarships, which are eligible for students with family income below $75,000.

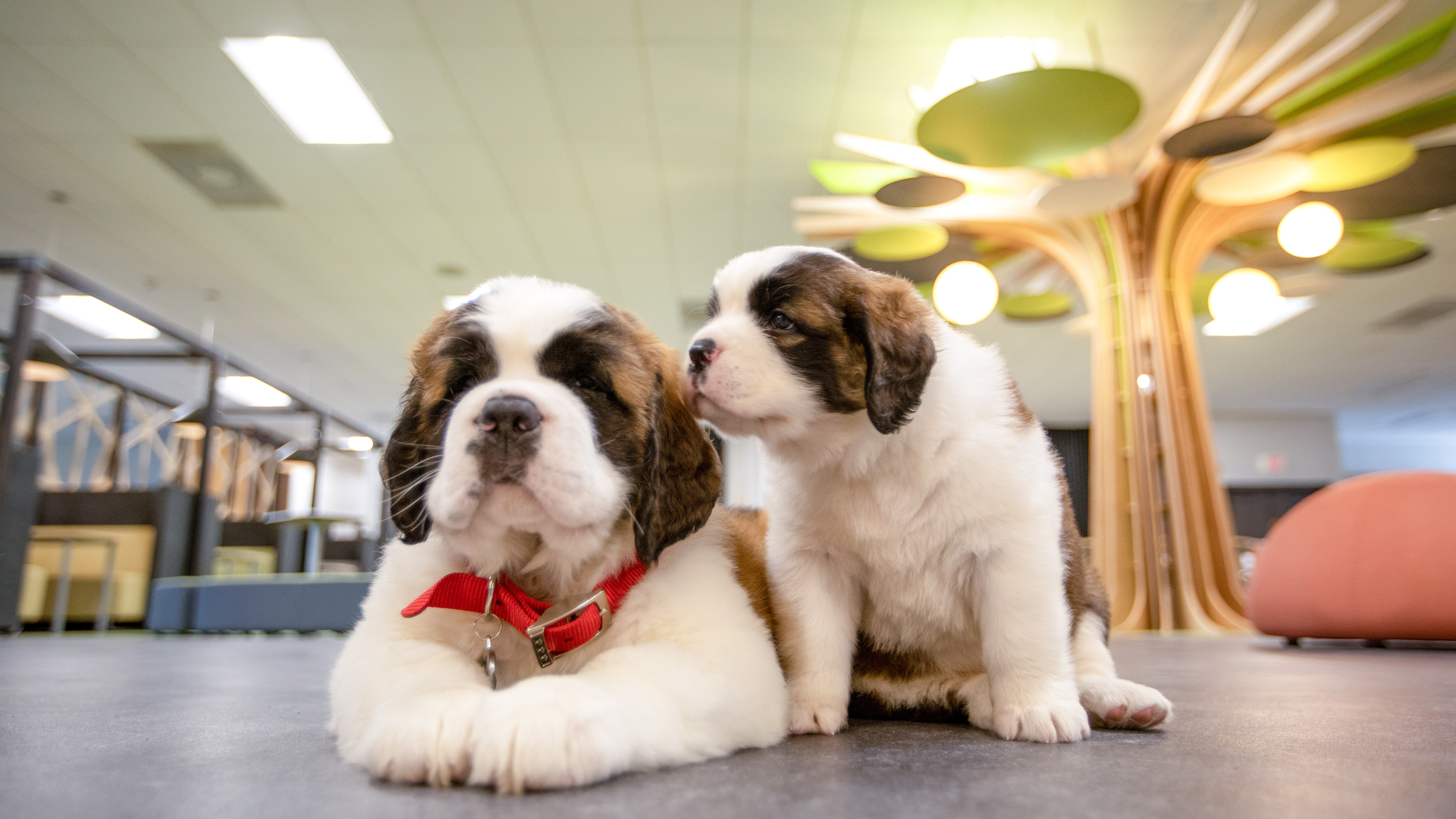
Mascots Saint & Maggie as puppies in 2020

=== Accreditation ===
D'Youville has specific academic programs accredited by:

- Accreditation Council for Pharmacy Education (ACPE)
- Accreditation Council on Chiropractic Education (CCE)
- Accreditation Council for Education in Nutrition and Dietetics (ACEND)
- Accreditation Council for Occupational Therapy Education (ACOTE)
- Commission on Accreditation in Physical Therapy Education (CAPTE)
- Commission on Collegiate Nursing Education (CCNE)
- New York State Board of Regents, State Education Department, Office of the Professions (Nursing Education).
- Accreditation Review Commission on Education for the Physician Assistant (ARC-PA).
- International Accreditation Council for Business Education (IACBE)

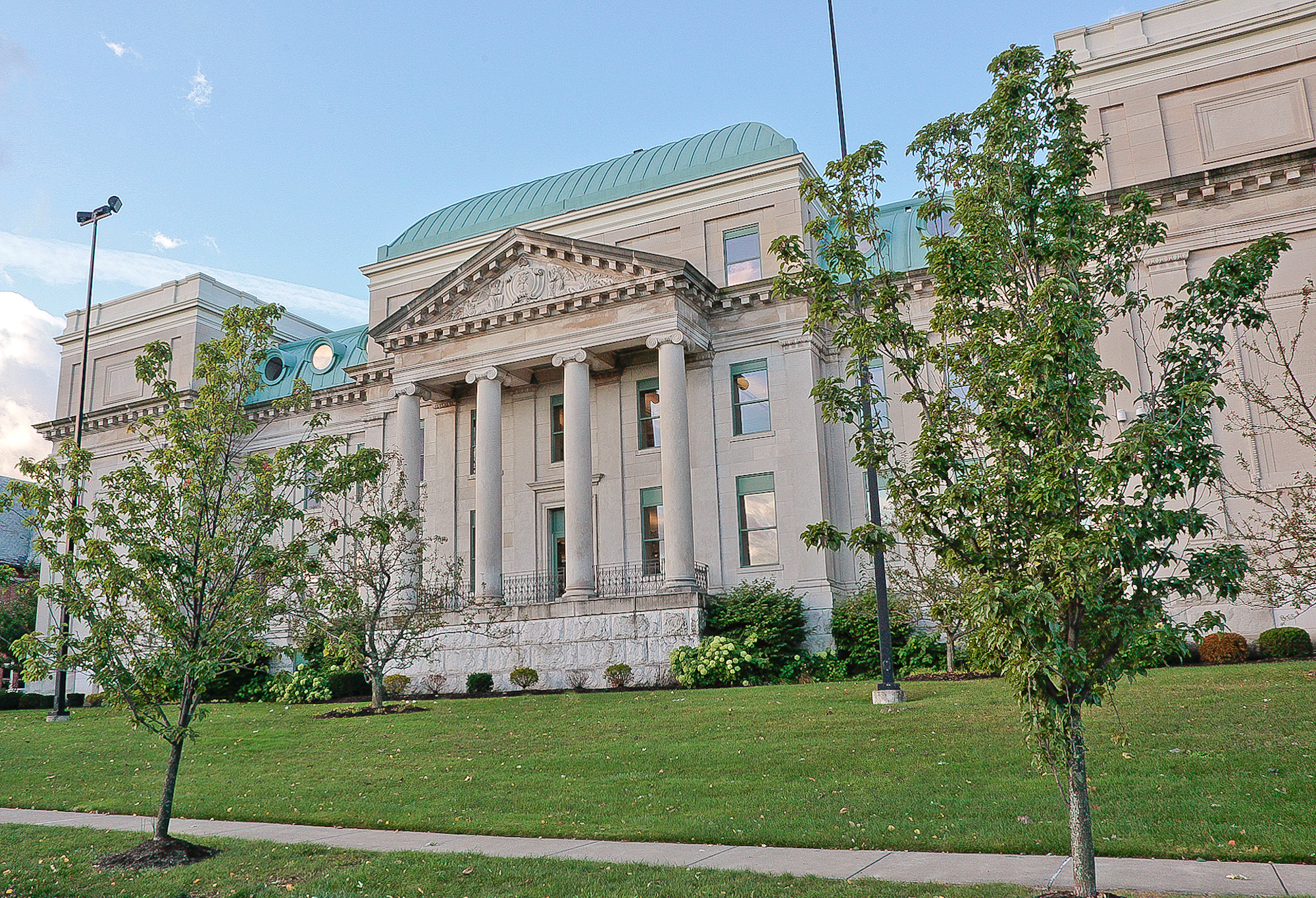
2011: Montante Family Library

=== Schools ===
Academic programs at the university are administered in four schools:

- Patricia H. Garman School of Nursing has degrees in Nursing (BSN; RN to BSN; Accelerated BSN), Nursing Education with Clinical Focus (MS), Nursing Management and Quality Leadership (MS), Family Nurse Practitioner (MS and DNP), Psychiatric Mental Health Nurse Practitioner (MS and DNP)
- School of Health Professions houses the departments of Chiropractic, Exercise & Sports Studies, Health Professions Education, Health Administration & Public Health, Nutrition & Dietetics, Occupational Therapy, Physical Therapy, Physician Assistant
- School of Pharmacy has degrees and programs such as Pharmaceutical Science (BSPS), Pre-Pharmacy Early Assurance Program, Doctor of Pharmacy (PharmD)
- School of Arts, Science and Education houses the departments of Biology & Mathematics, Business, Chemistry, Educational Leadership, Humanities, Social Sciences
- College of Osteopathic Medicine grants the Doctor of Osteopathic Medicine (D.O.) academic degree. DYU-COM holds pre-accreditation status with the American Osteopathic Association's Commission on Osteopathic College Accreditation (COCA). In September 2025, the school received pre-accreditation status by the American Osteopathic Association's Commission on Osteopathic College Accreditation. The school will be originally housed on campus, and then relocated to a building in downtown Buffalo that formerly housed the M&T Bank.

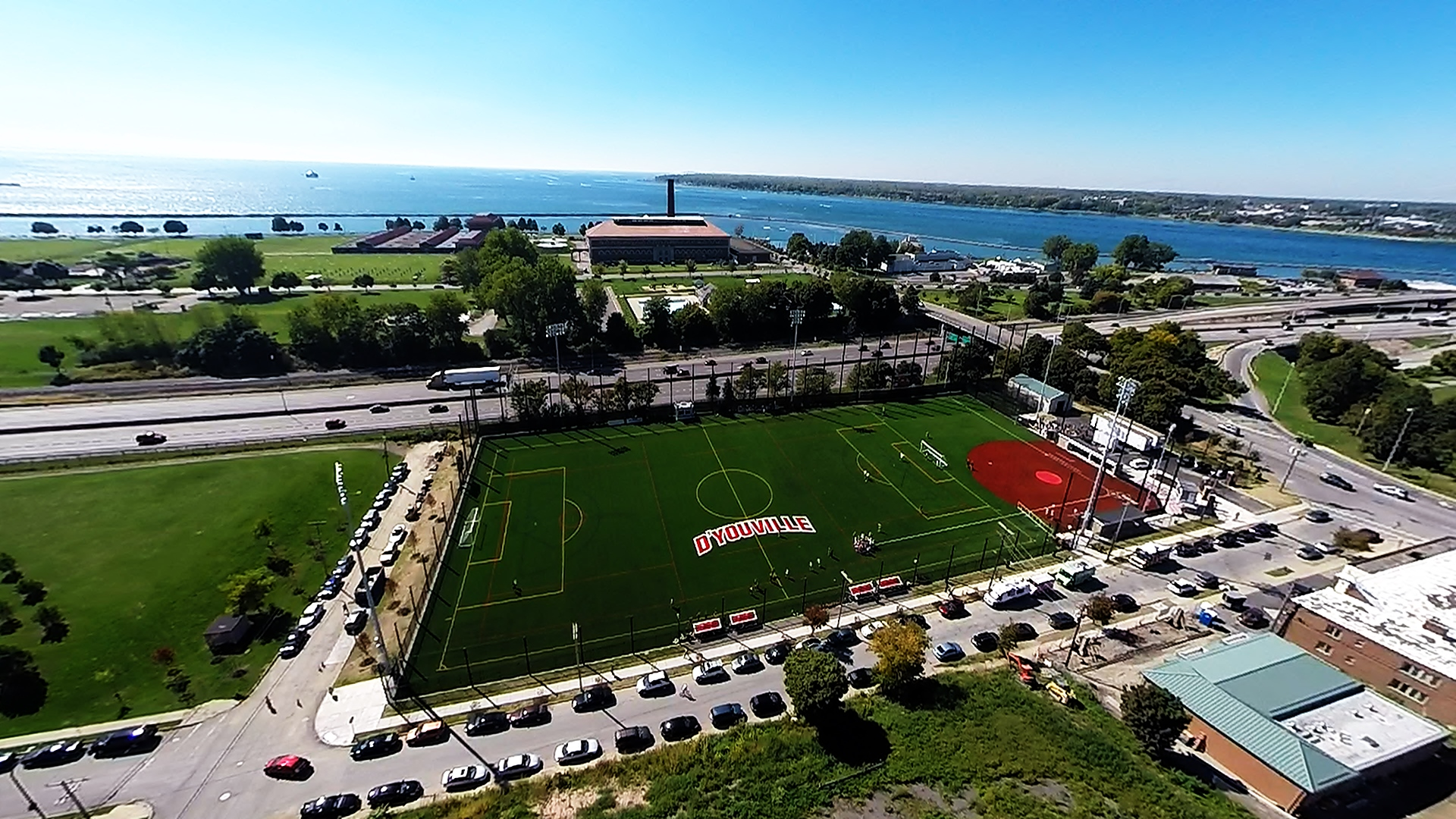
2017: Dobson Field Athletics Complex

=== Libraries ===
The first library at D'Youville was located in the main section of the Koessler Administration Building. Ground breaking for the first library building took place in 1955, after a year of fundraising. The library building was completed in September 1956, and replaced a grassy area and tennis court behind the Koessler Administration Building.

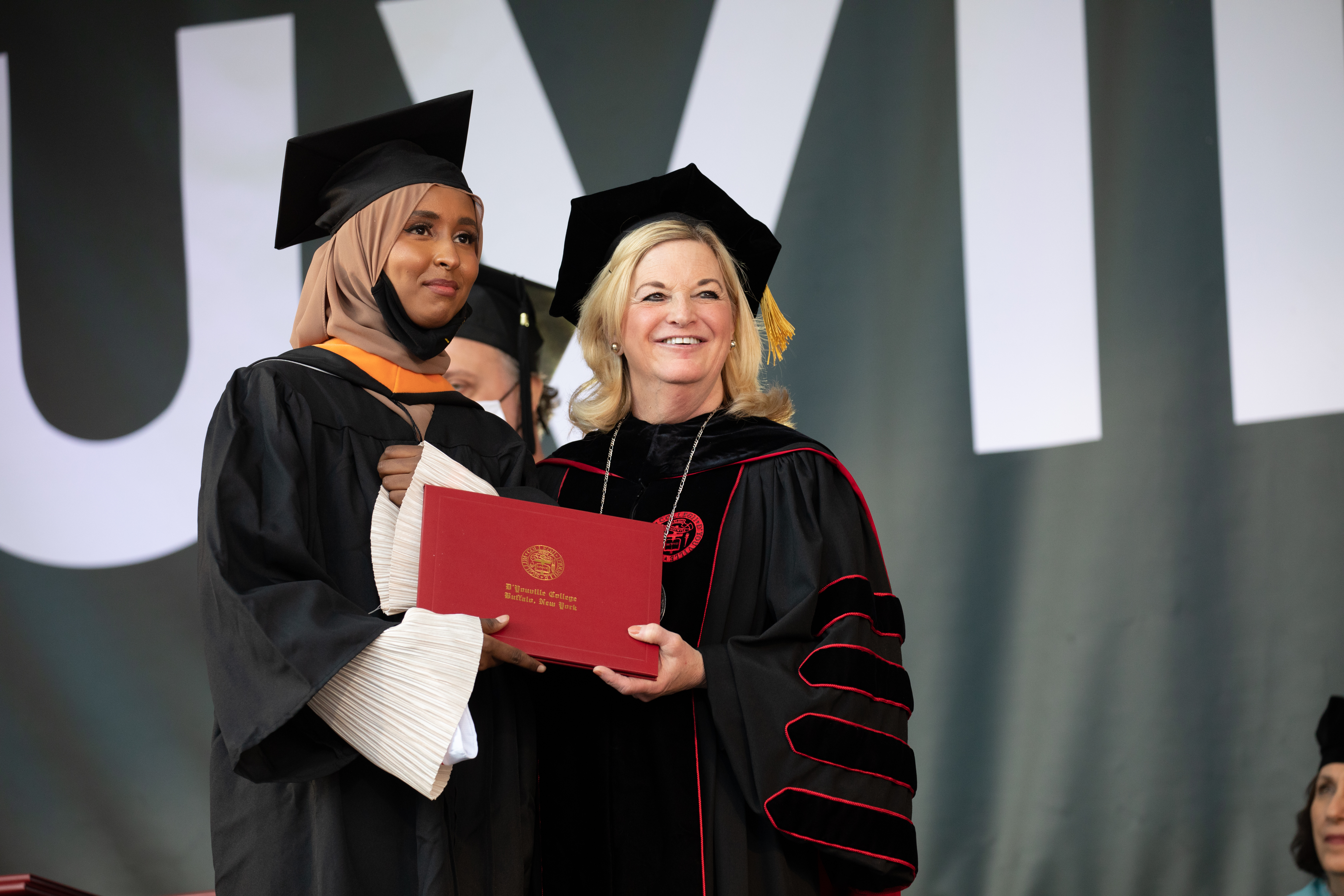
2021: Commencement at Highmark Stadium

The current 4-story Montante Family Library opened in 1999, after a $10 million renovation of the previous Holy Angels School building. The original library building was demolished in 2000 and the Bauer Family Academic Center was constructed in its place.

=== Rankings ===
In 2021, D'Youville was ranked as #299-391 among national universities and #113 in top performers on social mobility by U.S. News & World Report. In 2022, D'Youville was ranked #67 out of 726 best colleges for nursing in America, and #5 out of 42 best colleges for nursing in New York State by Niche. D'Youville was also ranked #25 out of 124 best value colleges in New York State, #8 out of 35 best value colleges with no application fee in New York, and #2 out of 9 best value colleges in Buffalo area by Niche.

== Student life ==
=== Athletics ===
D'Youville Saints
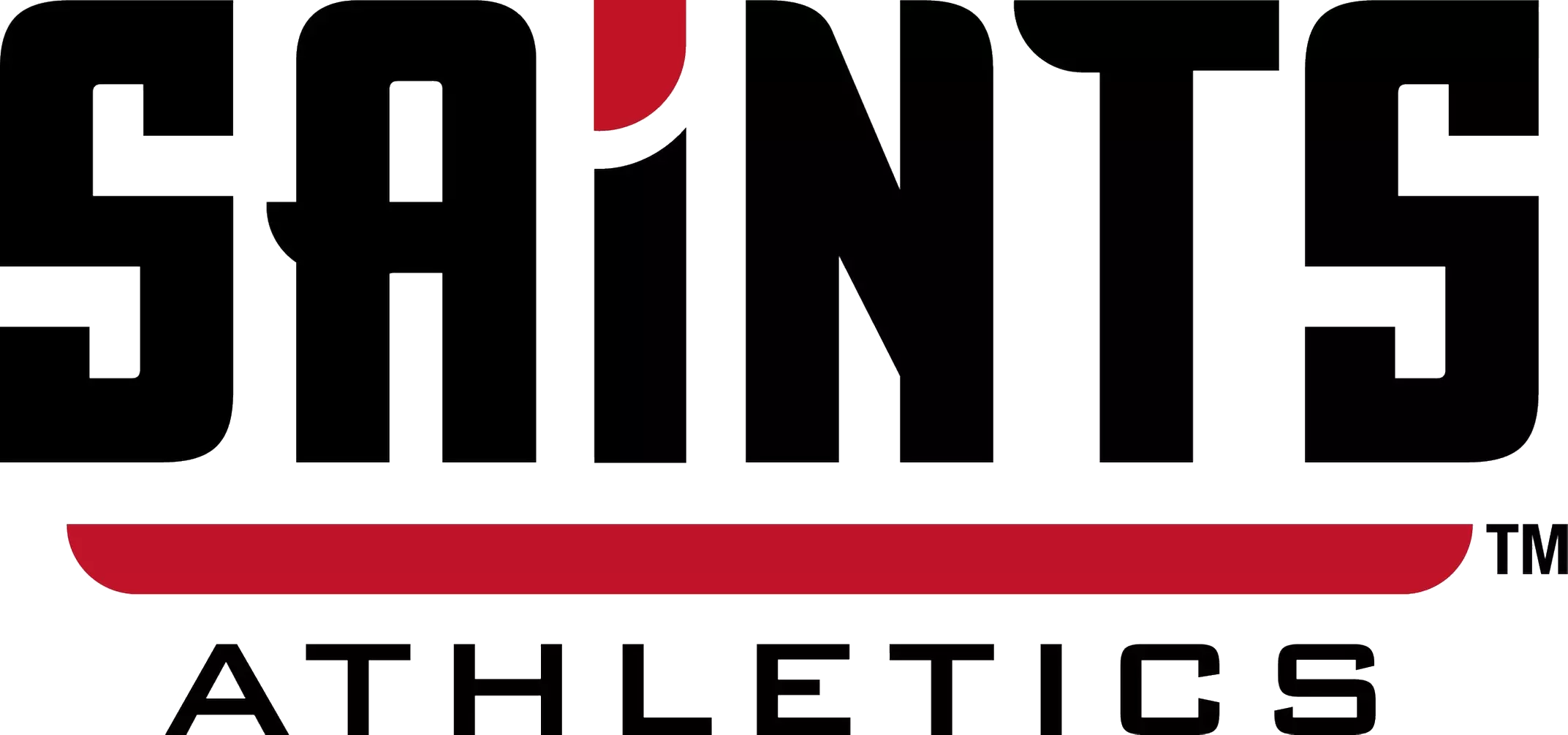
- Nickname: Saints
- NCAA: NCAA Division II; NCAA Division I (men's volleyball)
- Conference: East Coast Conference; Northeast Conference (men's volleyball)
- Athletic director: Ona Halladay
- Location: Buffalo, New York
- Varsity teams: 16
- Football stadium: Dobson Field
- Basketball arena: Saints Center Gym
- Baseball stadium: Sal Maglie Stadium
- Colors: D'Youville Red, Porter Gray, and West Ave White
- Mascot: "Saint" & "Maggie"
- Website: dyusaints.com

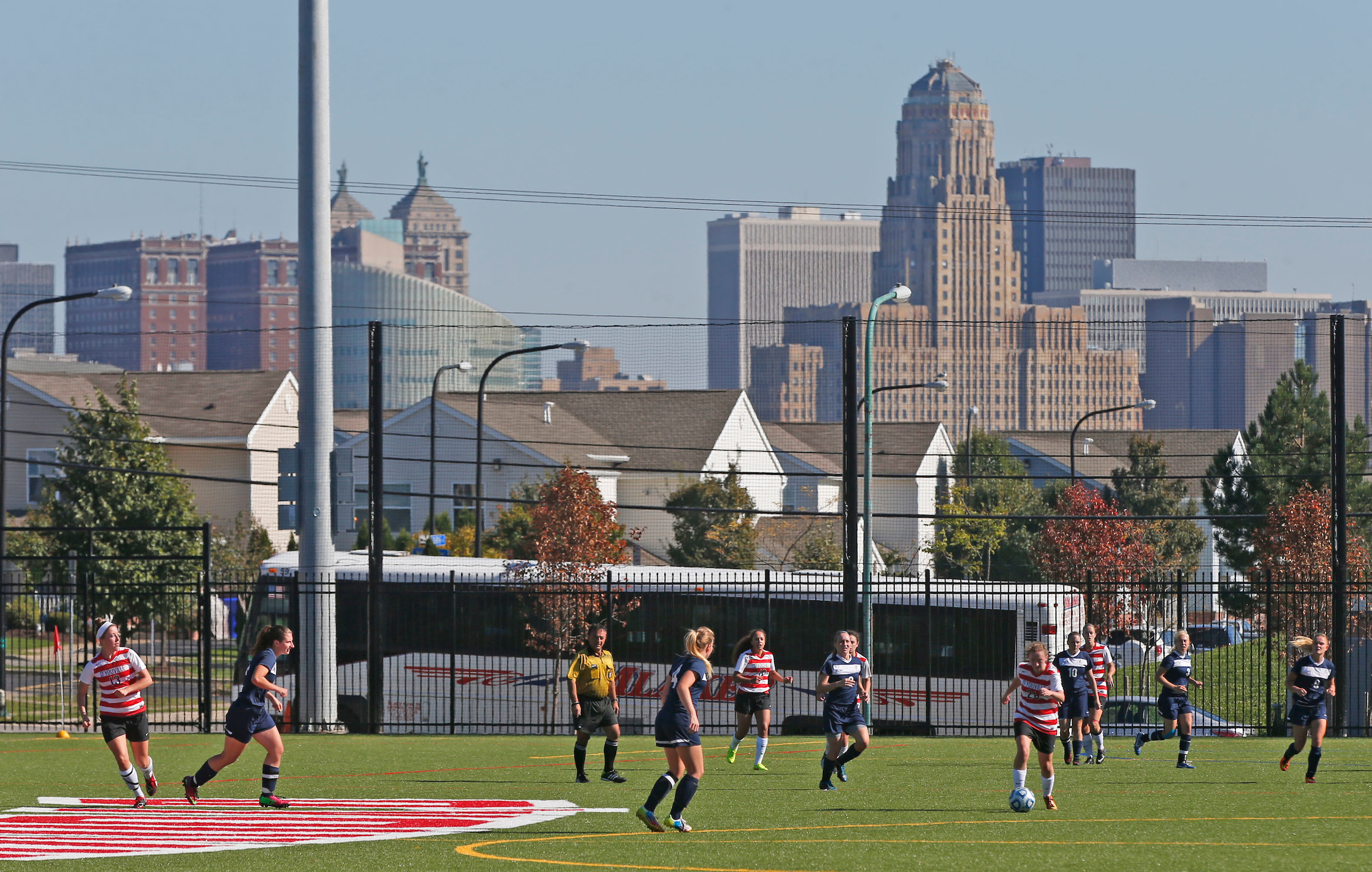
Soccer at Dobson Field Athletics Complex

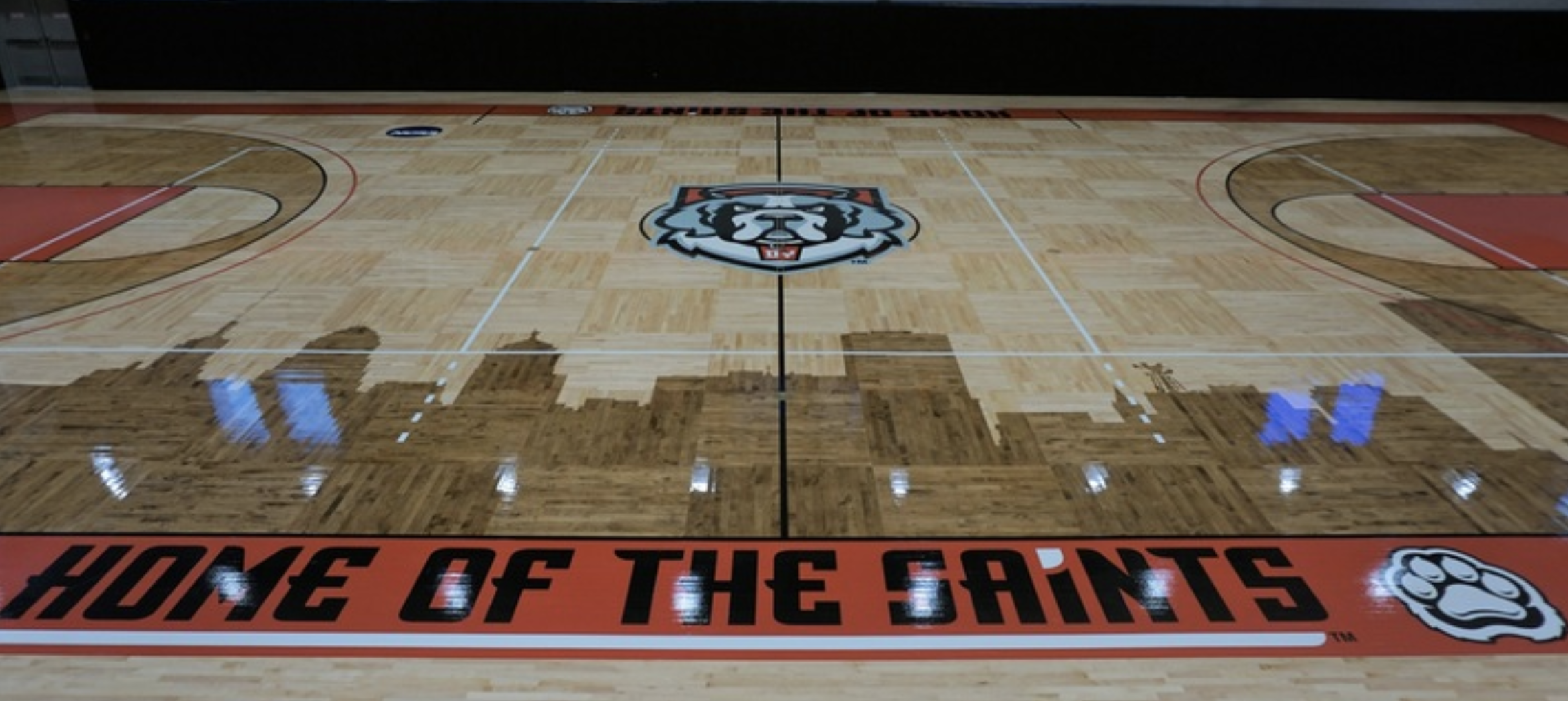
Saints Center Gym

D'Youville was approved July 2020 to compete at the NCAA Division II ranks, as a new provisional member of the East Coast Conference (ECC) beginning in the 2020–21 season.

D'Youville joined the Northeast Conference in Division I for men's volleyball in 2022.

D'Youville previously competed at the NCAA Division III ranks, as a member of the Allegheny Mountain Collegiate Conference (AMCC) from 2009–10 to 2019–20, and as a member of the North Eastern Athletic Conference (NEAC; now known as the United East Conference) from 2004–05 to 2008–09. D'Youville will become eligible for Division II national championships in 2023–24. Given that the NCAA operates a single bowling championship open to members of all NCAA divisions, bowling is the only sport that D'Youville will be eligible for a national championship during their provisional transition period.

As part of the transition to NCAA Division II, D'Youville announced a change of their mascot's identity from the Spartans to the Saints, giving symbolism to the patroness Saint Marie-Marguerite d'Youville. The new athletics mascot is depicted as a St. Bernard and as part of the rebranding campaign, D'Youville unveiled a pair of St. Bernard puppies, Maggie and Saint, which now roam the campus as their official mascots.

The athletic department announced the addition of men's lacrosse and esports as new sports beginning in 2021–22, bringing the institution to have 16 intercollegiate programs.

=== Student organizations ===
The Student Government Association of D'Youville consists of an elected senate and an executive council. The Senate is organized into 4 committees: public relations, student outreach, student action, and student engagement. D'Youville has over 45 campus clubs and organizations which sponsor events, activities and community service.

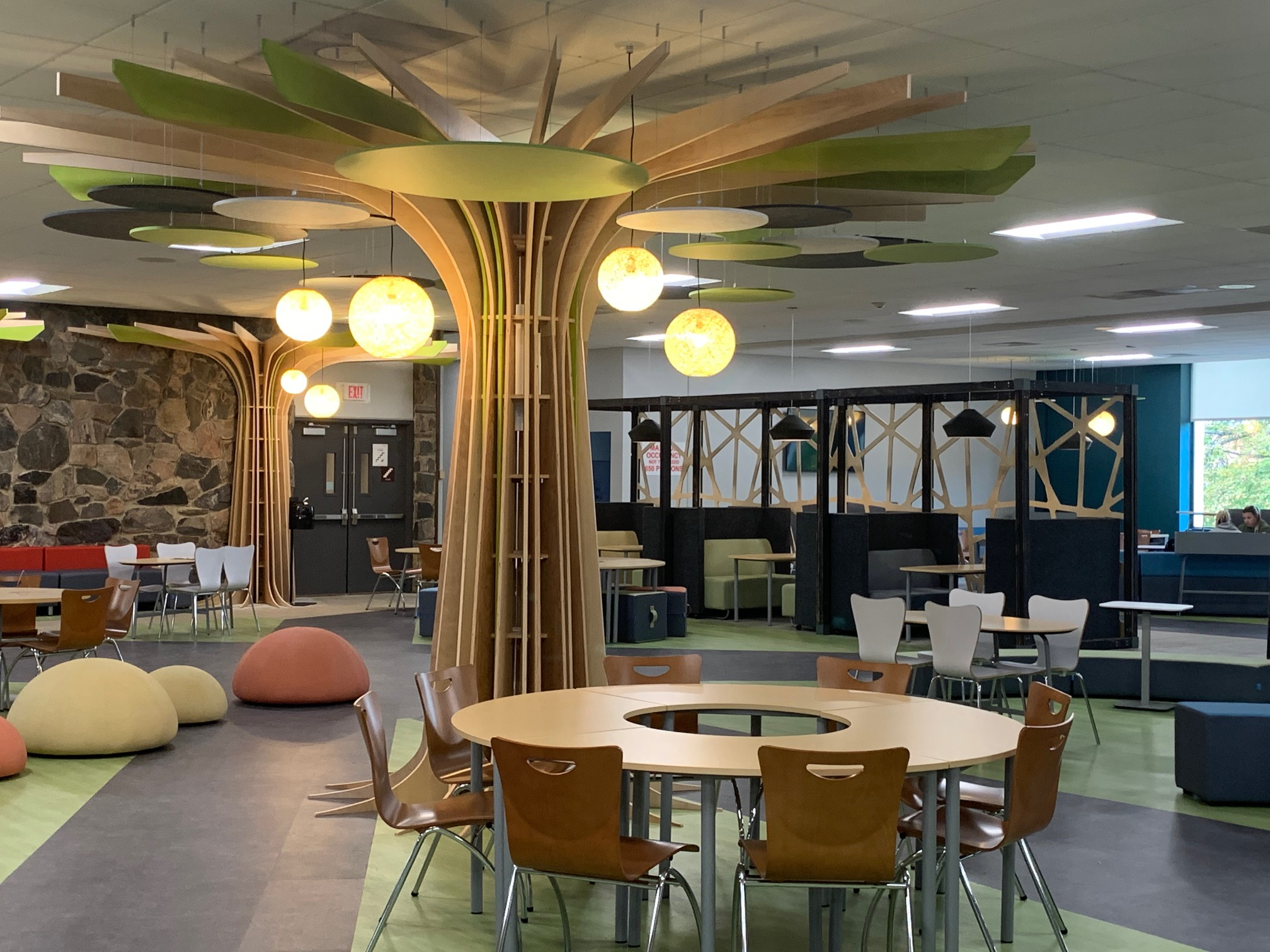
2020: Kurdt Dining Hall

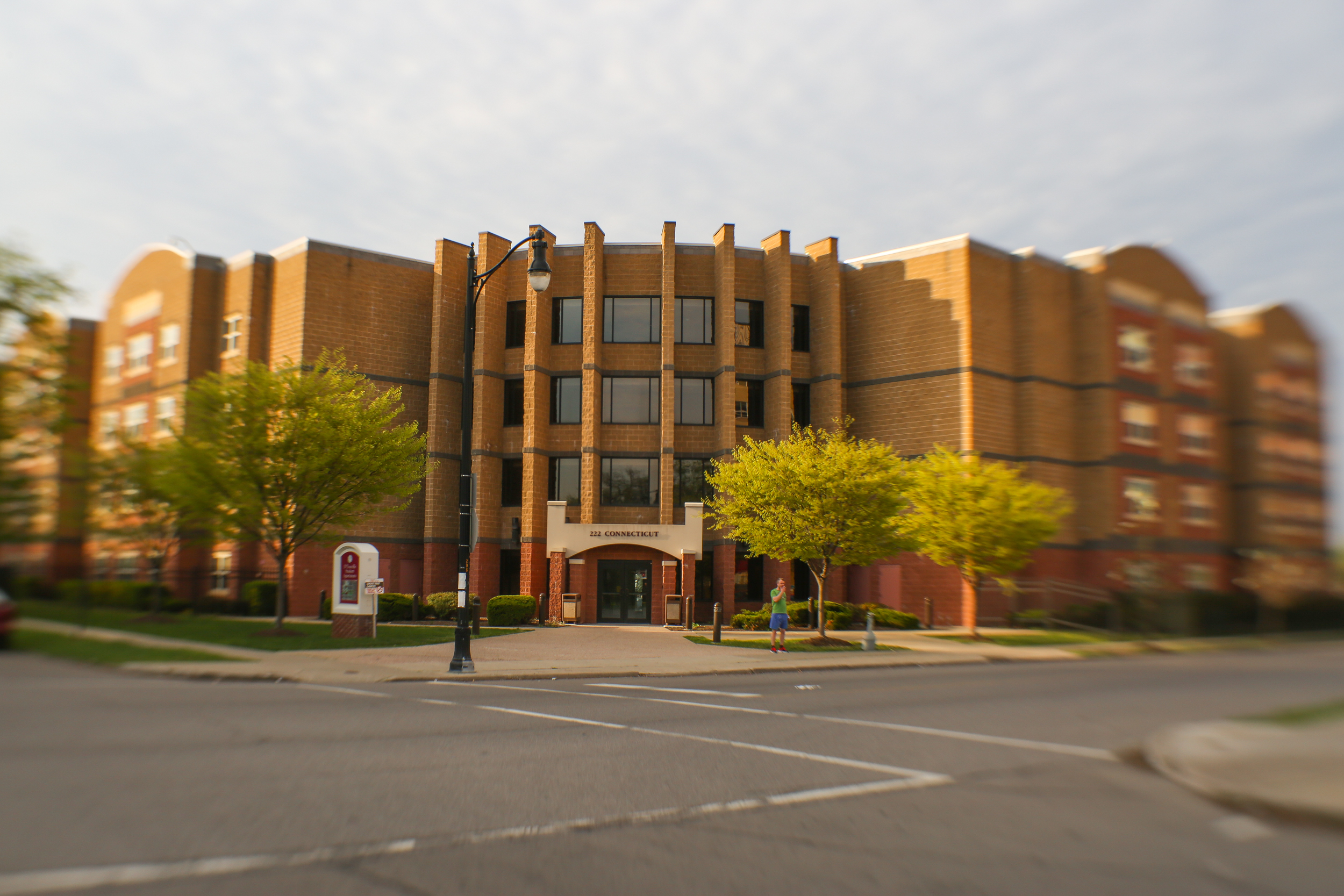
222 Connecticut St. Apartments

=== Housing ===
D'Youville has two student housing buildings. Marguerite Hall is a traditional 12-story housing building consisting primarily of traditional two-person dorm rooms. The 222 Apartment Complex is a four-story housing building primarily consisting of four-bedroom apartment suites each with two bathrooms and a shared kitchen and common room.

=== Media ===
A variety of student-sponsored and institutional-sponsored newspapers, magazines and periodicals have been published at D'Youville. The D'Youville Magazine was first published in 1910 and ran through the 1960s, primarily serving as an outlet for student papers as well as other literary publications and commentary. The D'Youvillian began in the 1930s and was published through the 1990s, primarily serving as a student yearbook. The D'Mensions Magazine is the alumni periodical that is currently being published.

=== Theatre ===
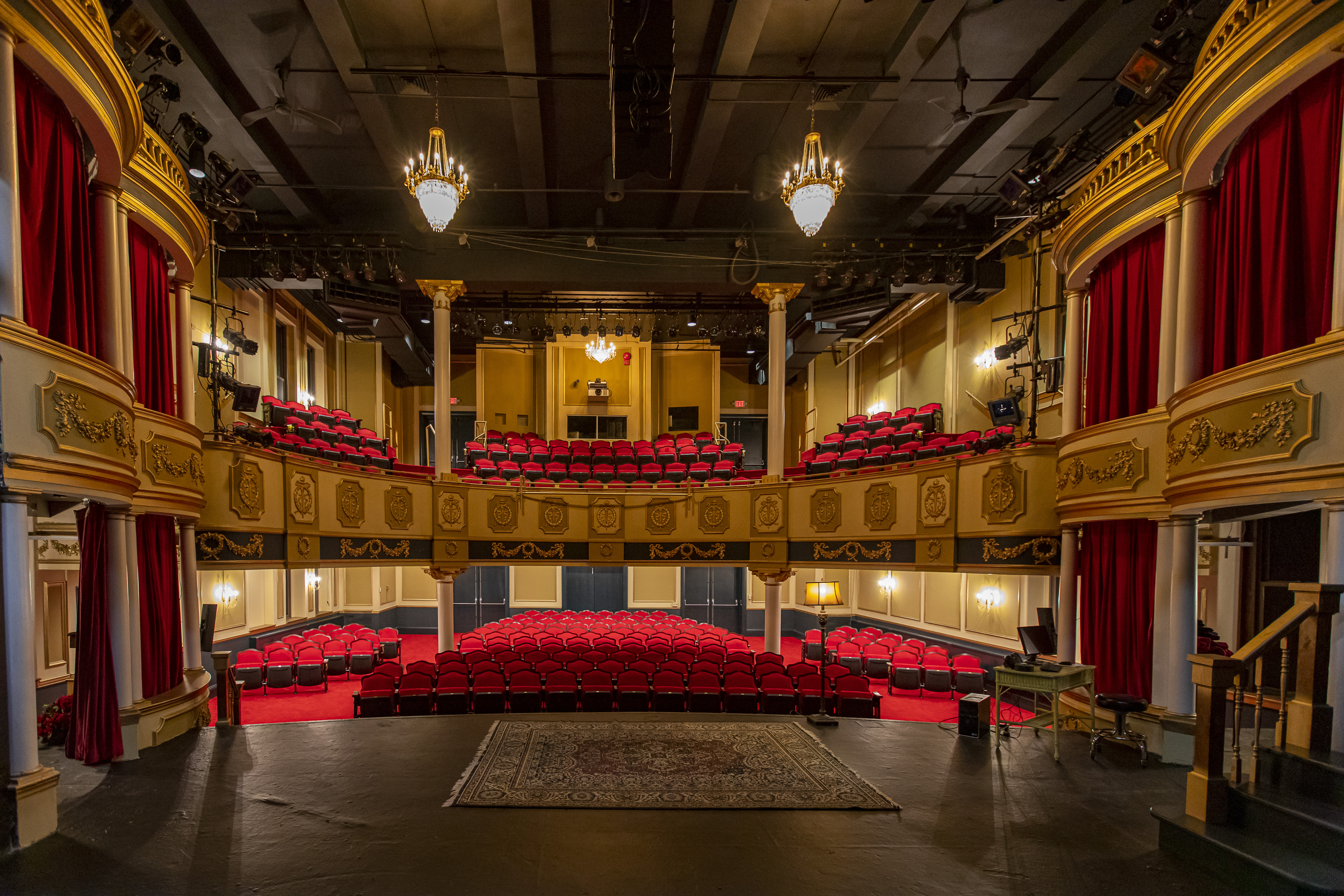
2020: D'Youville's Kavinoky Theatre

The 240-seat Kavinoky Theatre on D'Youville's campus was initially built in the early 1900s as an Edwardian recital hall designed for vocal performances, string quartets, and piano recitals. Music was an essential aspect of student life and coursework up until the 1950s, as choir and glee club were two of the most well attended student organizations.

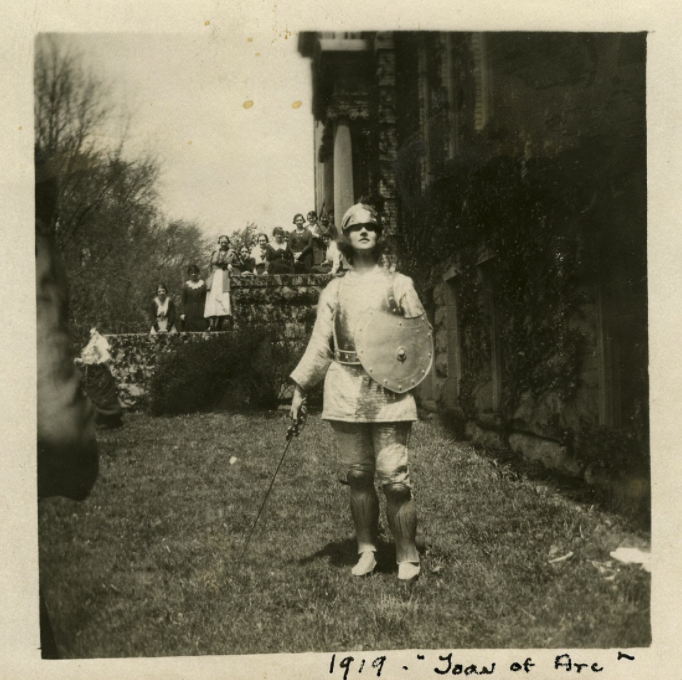
1919: Joan of Arc costume for Spring Play

In the mid-1970s, the recital hall was re-envisioned to become a fully functional professional theatre for plays and musicals. A capital campaign was led by Edward Kavinoky, the board of trustees chairman at the time, to renovate the space and extend the stage to support theatre productions. The theater was dedicated to Edward Kavinoky after his passing in 1977, and the renovations were completed in 1980. The Kavinoky Theatre was renovated again to have new paint, carpet and seating in 2020, partially sponsored by the New York State Council on the Arts. Recently, the Kavinoky Theatre has produced shows such as To Kill a Mocking Bird, Hairspray, 1984, Spamalot, and Sweeny Todd.

=== Public art ===
In 2008, D'Youville unveiled a 6 1/2-foot bronze statue of Marie-Marguerite d'Youville created by David Derner in front of the Koessler Administration Building. The statue depicts an orphan girl looking up at d'Youville, while a cat plays with a key that the girl had just dropped on the ground. The statue plaque highlights d'Youville's life span (1701–1771) and her title "Mother of Universal Charity," which was given to her by Pope John XXIII in 1959.

On October 11, 2019, in alignment to National Coming Out Day for the LGBTQ+ community, D'Youville host an inclusivity event named "From the closet to the sidewalk" and unveiled the As is mural by Casey Millbrand. According to Millbrand, the public art is intended to represent "individuality, acceptance, and inclusion".

On June 19, 2020, in alignment to the Juneteenth holiday celebration, D'Youville unveiled the Black Matter is Life mural by Maxx Moses. The mural was positioned adjacent to Millbrand's As is mural and was intended to address racial justice.

August 12, 2021, to finalize the Health Professions Hub building, the Tree of Y mural was painted on the facade by Maya Hayuk. The mural was organized in partnership with the Albright-Knox Art Gallery as part of their Public Art Initiative. The mural is 45 feet high, 95 wide, and used around 95 gallons of paint to complete.

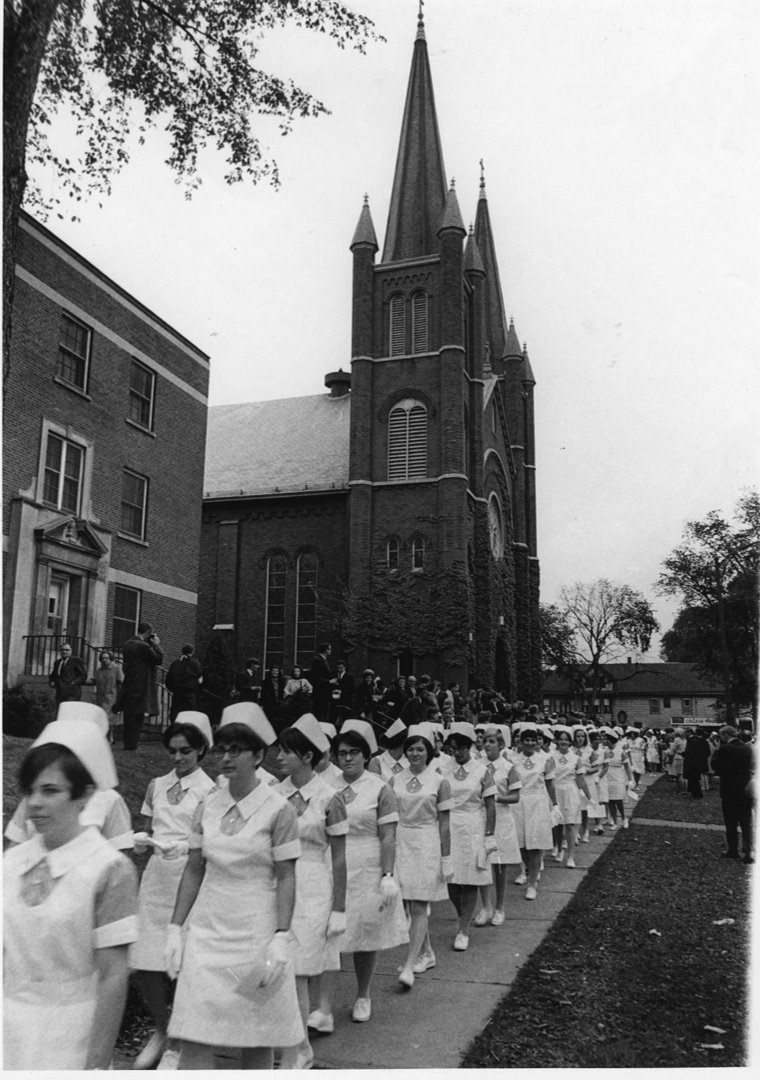
Capping ceremony 1950s–1960s

=== Traditions ===
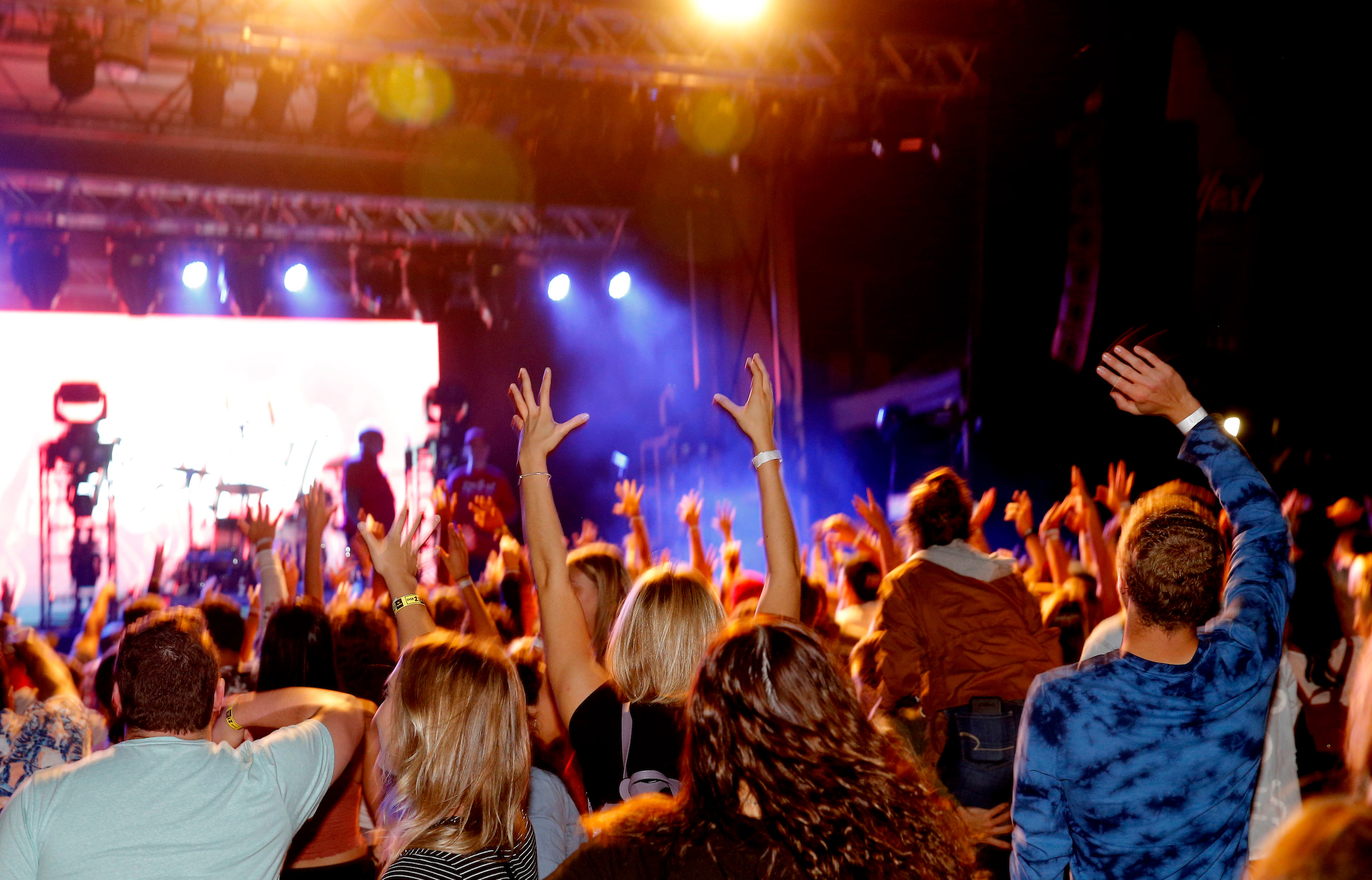
2019 Redfest

- Academic Milestones such as White Coat Ceremonies and Capping Ceremonies for health-related degrees.
- Redfest is an annual music festival hosted by the Student Government Organization at the Dobson Athletics Complex. Artists have included Jarred Neimann, MAX, Jon Langston, Russell Dickerson, Futuristic, Adam Barrett, Stanaj, and Jojo.
- Volunteerism takes place in multiple forms and is commonly referred to with Marie-Marguerite d'Youville's credo, "we never refuse to serve".
- Moving Up Day is an end of the semester event that celebrated the transition to next level. At this event many student would compete for their beauty, such as through "flip" hairstyles and the nomination of the "MUD" queen.

== People ==
=== Notable alumni ===
- Mary Margaret Anderson, philanthropist and spouse of entrepreneur Harry W. Anderson
- Rosalie Bertell, U.S./Canadian nun, physician, author, researcher, epidemiologist
- Eleonora Cecchini - San Marino youth international soccer player
- Marcella Farinelli Fierro, medical examiner and forensic pathologist
- Tara Hedican, Canadian wrestling champion, coach, and teacher
- Ann Wood-Kelly, the first and youngest female aviator during WW II
- Dorthy H. Rose, former member of the New York State Assembly
- John Tavares, Canadian lacrosse player and coach
- Soo Wong, member of the Legislative Assembly of Ontario
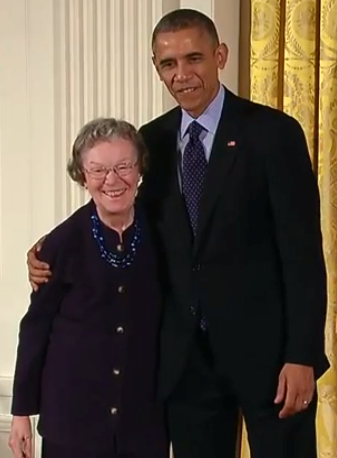
Edith M. Flanigen,
American Chemist

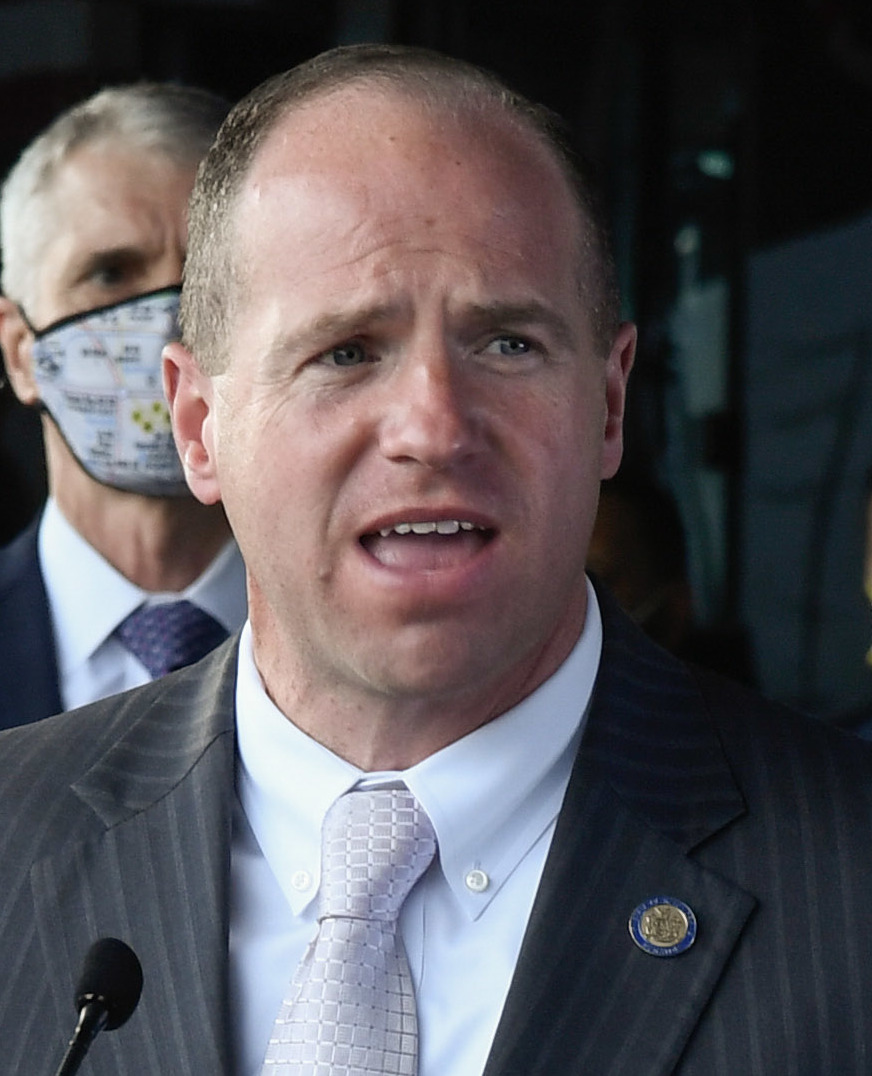
Timothy M. Kennedy,
U.S. Representative

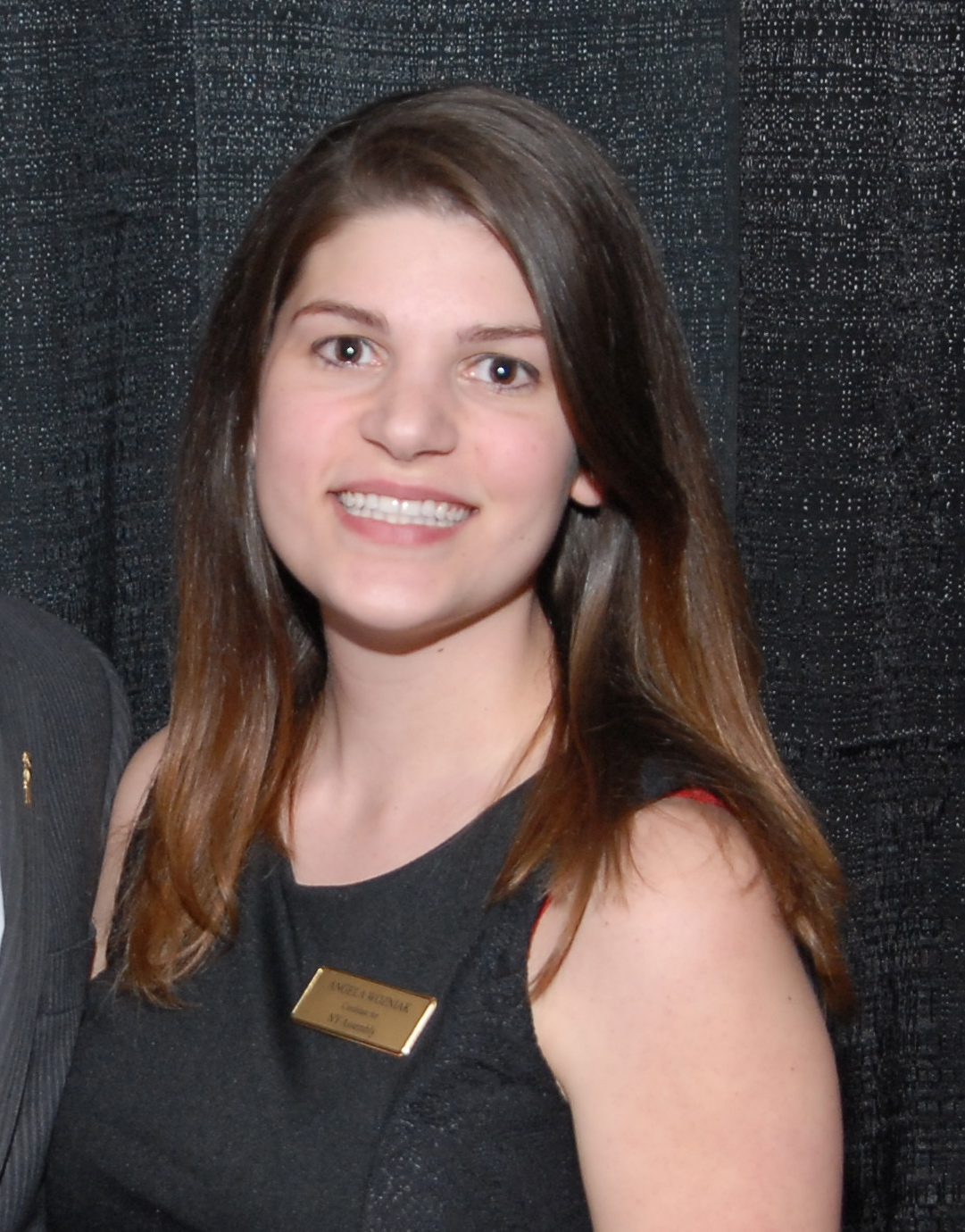
Angela Wozniak,
Former Member of New York State Assembly

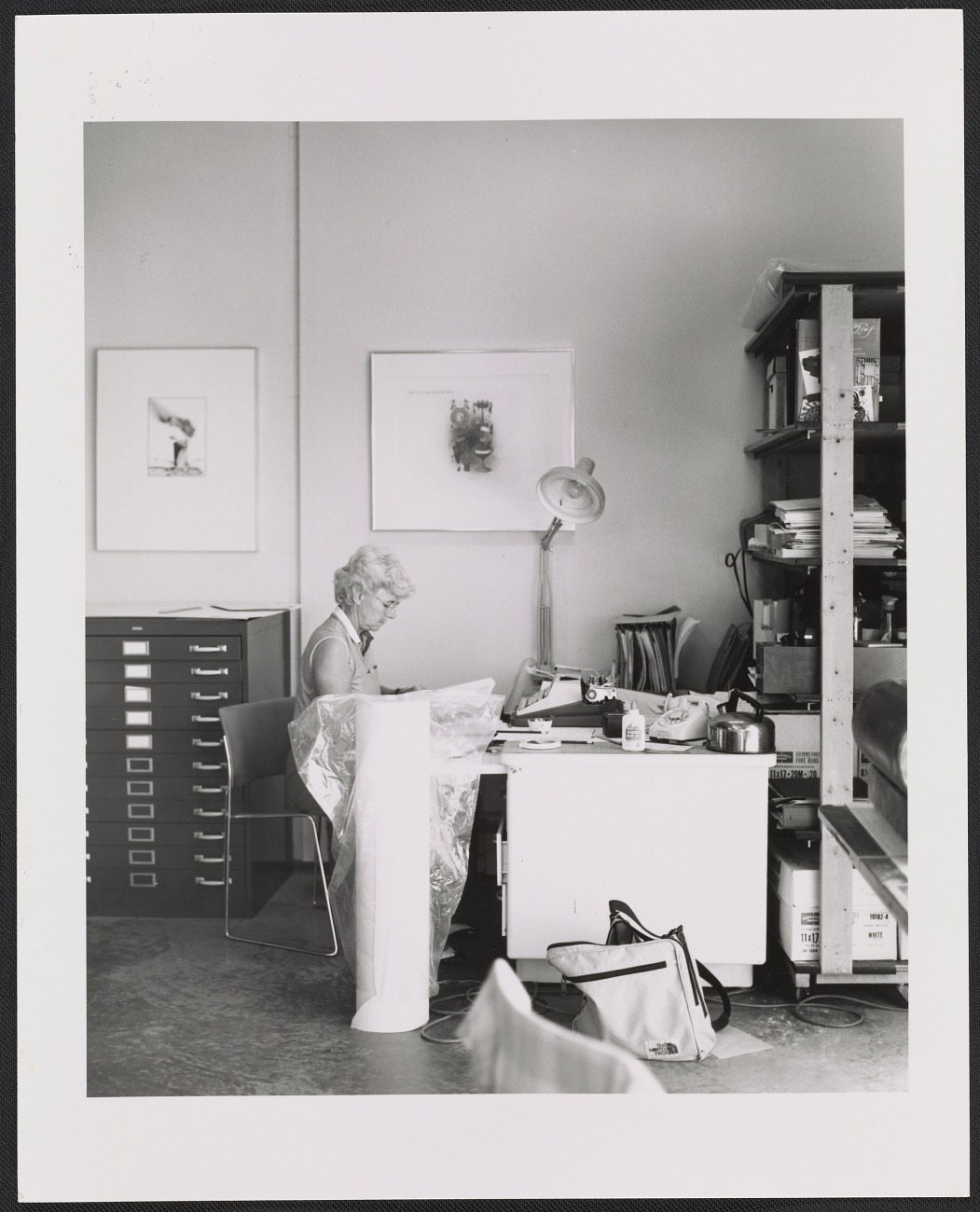
Mary Margaret Anderson
Philanthropist

== See also ==
- Marie–Marguerite d'Youville
- Grey Nuns
- Upward Bound
- Say Yes To Education
- Higher Education Opportunity Program
