= Lorrie Clemo =

American political scientist

Lorrie A. Clemo
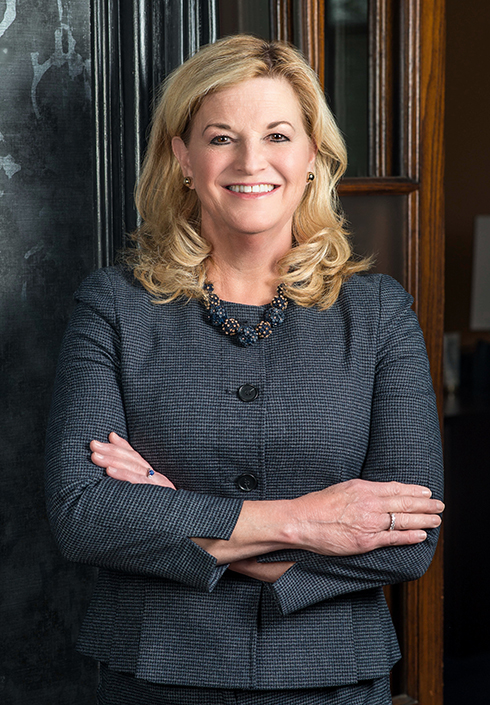

15th President of D'Youville University
- Incumbent
- Assumed office January 2017
- Preceded by: Sister Denise A. Roche

Provost and VP for Academic Affairs at State University of New York at Oswego
- In office June 2010 – December 2016
- Preceded by: Susan Coultrap-McQuin
- Succeeded by: Scott Furlong

Personal details
- Born: United States
- Education: Binghamton University; Le Moyne College
- Profession: Political Science; Policy Studies; Public Administration
- Website: www.dyc.edu/about/leadership/

Lorrie Ann Clemo (born January 1961) is an American political scientist who is the 15th president of D'Youville University, serving since January 2017. She also sits on the Board of Directors at Kaleida Health the Buffalo Niagara Partnership, the Commission on Independent Colleges and Universities in New York (CICU), and the Western New York Higher Education Consortium. Previously she served as Provost and Vice President for Academic Affairs at the State University of New York at Oswego since 2012.

== Education ==
Clemo completed her undergraduate studies in political science at LeMoyne College, graduating in 1983. She earned master's and doctoral degrees in political science, public administration, and policy analysis from Binghamton University, completing her Ph.D. in 1998.

== Career ==
Succeeding Sister Denise A. Roche, and interim President William Mariani, Clemo was formally inaugurated as President of D'Youville College September 29, 2017 after serving as president since January 2017. Her inaugural address entitled "The Purpose of Our Being" reflected on both the influence of her parents and the institution's history. Most recently, she held a press conference announcing the approval of a charter amendment for "D'Youville College" to become "D'Youville University" and has been focusing on the implementation of a four day, 32-hour work week at D'Youville College, which is described as a multifaceted health and wellness initiative for staff and administration.

She previously served as Provost and Vice President for Academic Affairs, Chief of Staff, Assistant to the President for Special Programs and Campus Communications, and Faculty Fellow to the President at the State University of New York at Oswego. Clemo was an American Council on Education Fellow in the class of 2007-2008. She was also a faculty member and Director of the Public Policy and Administration department at the State University of New York at Oswego.

== Professional involvement ==
She sits on the Board of Directors at Kaleida Health, the Commission on Independent Colleges and Universities in New York (CICU), the Buffalo Niagara Partnership, and the Western New York Higher Education Consortium. Previously, Clemo has held various leadership appointments including President of the NCAA Faculty Athletics Representative Association, Vice Chair of the New York State Sea Grant Institute and Board of Governors, World Association of Cooperative Education Board, American Council on Education Executive Council of Fellows Board, and On Point for College Executive Board.

== Personal life ==
Clemo is a resident of Buffalo, New York. She and her husband, Steve Nicolais, have four grown children.
