= Harry W. Anderson =

American businessman (1922–2018)

- Born: October 5, 1922; Corning, New York
- Died: February 7, 2018 (aged 95)
- Other name: Hunk Anderson
- Education: Hobart and William Smith Colleges
- Occupations: Businessman, art collector, philanthropist
- Spouse: Mary Margaret "Moo" Ransford (m. 1950–2018; death)
- Children: 1

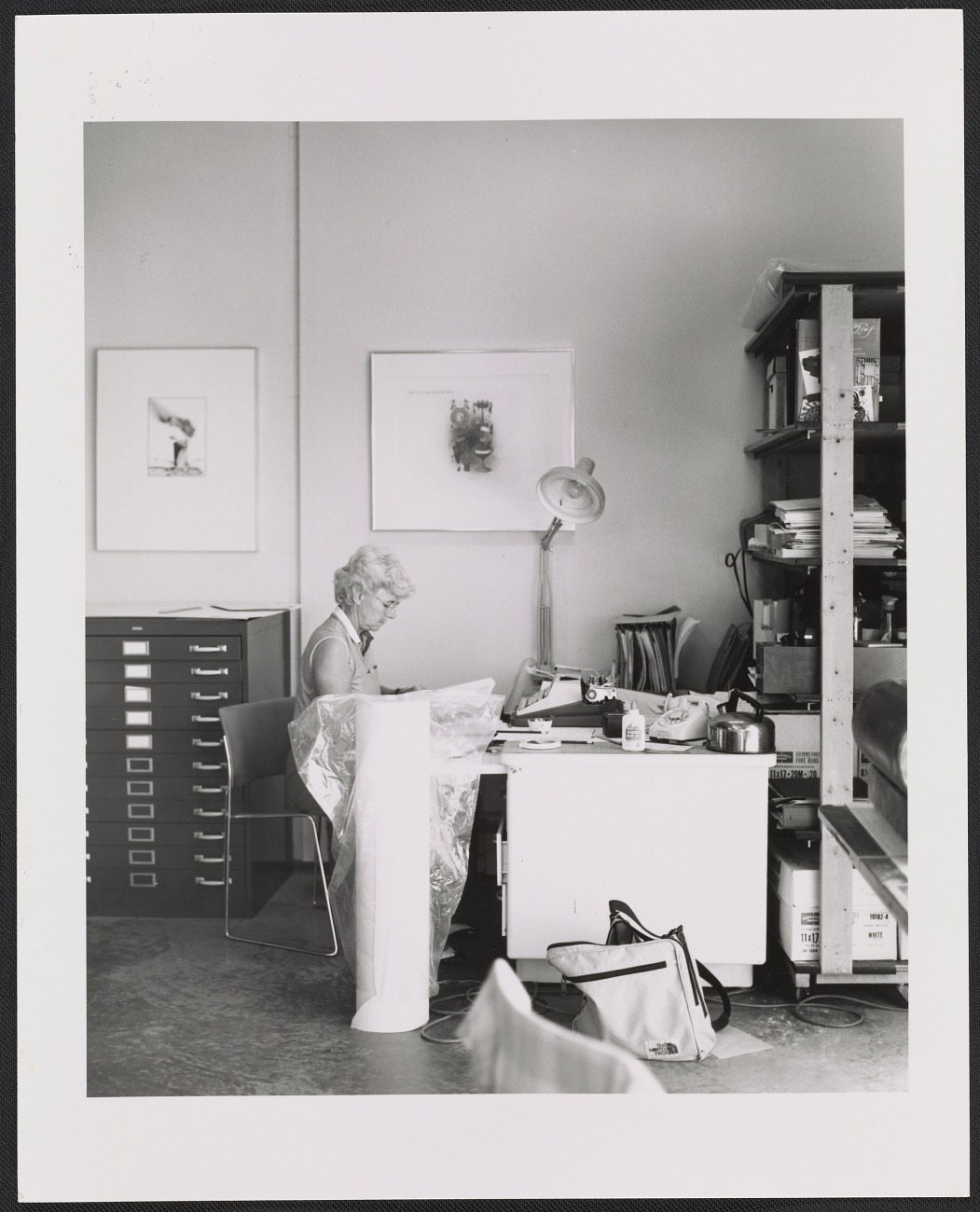
Harry W. Anderson's wife Mary Margaret "Moo" Anderson at 3EP Ltd. Press (June 1981)

Harry W. Anderson, also known as Hunk Anderson, (October 5, 1922 – February 7, 2018) was an American businessman, art collector and philanthropist. He was the co-founder of Saga Foods Co., a food company for college dormitories. With his wife, Mary Margaret Anderson, he donated works of art to the San Francisco Museum of Modern Art and to the Anderson Collection at Stanford University.

== Early life and career ==
Anderson was born on October 5, 1922, in Corning, New York. He was a first-generation American, as his father was born in Sweden and his mother in Norway. Anderson played football in high school, and it was then that he took the nickname "Hunk", after Heartley Anderson. He graduated from Hobart and William Smith Colleges.

Anderson co-founded Saga Foods Co., a food company for college dormitories, while he was still in college. The company moved into an office on Sand Hill Road. It made "more than 400 million meals a year across the United States" in 1973, and it became a public company in the same decade, until it merged with Marriott.

== Art collection and donations ==
With his wife, Anderson became a significant art collector in the 1960s. They first collected works of art by Claude Monet, Pablo Picasso, Camille Pissarro, Henri Matisse, Emile Nolde, Arthur Dove, Georgia O'Keeffe, and Marsden Hartley. They subsequently purchased works by Alexander Calder, Vija Celmins, Richard Diebenkorn, Jean Dubuffet, Sam Francis, Alberto Giacometti, Adolph Gottlieb, David Hockney, Jasper Johns, Willem de Kooning, Joan Mitchell, Jackson Pollock, Martin Puryear, Saul Steinberg, Clyfford Still and Wayne Thiebaud.

By 2000, the Andersons had donated works from their collection by Jim Dine, Roy Lichtenstein, Robert Rauschenberg, Frank Stella, and Andy Warhol to the San Francisco Museum of Modern Art. Between October 7, 2000, and January 15, 2001, the museum hosted Celebrating Modern Art: The Anderson Collection, an exhibition over three floors of "more than 300 paintings, sculptures and drawings by nearly 140 artists."

Other works donated by the Andersons went to the Oakland Museum of California, the San Jose Museum of Art, and the Fine Arts Museums of San Francisco. In 2014, the Andersons donated 121 works of art to the Anderson Collection at Stanford University. They included paintings by Philip Guston, Franz Kline, Mark Rothko, and David Smith. To house and display this collection, a new museum was built directly adjacent to the Cantor Arts Center.

== Personal life and death ==
Anderson married Mary Margaret "Moo" Ransford in July 1950. Moo Anderson was active in the local arts, and between 1978 and 1984, she was a co-owner of 3EP Ltd. Press in Palo Alto, California. They had a daughter, Mary Patricia (known as "Putter"), and they resided in Menlo Park, California. Harry Anderson died on February 7, 2018, and Moo died on October 22, 2019.
