= Health Sciences Charter School =

Coordinates: 42.909055°N 78.865258°W

Location
- 1140 Ellicott Street; Masten Park; Buffalo, Erie, New York 14209; United States

Information
- Established: 2009
- Principal: Nichole Y. Walls
- Asst. Principal: Christie Walker
- Asst. Principal: John Jones
- Head of school: Robert Baxter
- Grades: 9-12
- Website: Health Sciences Charter School

Health Sciences Charter School is a charter high school located in the City of Buffalo, New York. The school opened in 2010 and is located at 1140 Ellicott Street and is located in the East Side of Buffalo, a few blocks north of the Buffalo Niagara Medical Campus. The current principal is Ms. Nichole Walls.

== Academics ==
Health Sciences Charter School was founded by multiple healthcare organizations (including in response to the growing need of healthcare professionals in the Buffalo area. These organizations provide internships to HSCS students as part of their coursework.

Health Sciences Charter School's partners include:

- Blue Cross Blue Shield Association of WNY
- Catholic Health System
- Communications Workers of America
- Erie Community College
- Erie County Medical Center
- Independent Health Association
- Kaleida Health System
- Roswell Park Comprehensive Cancer Center
- Univera Healthcare

== History ==
The school was originally housed at 169 Sheridan Parkway Drive in Tonawanda, New York. In 2011, it moved into its current location at 1140 Ellicott Street, constructed in 1898 as St. Vincent's Female Orphan Asylum. The building was used as Bishop O'Hern High School from 1952-1971 and later Erie Community College until 1981.

Health Sciences began as a ninth grade only school, adding one grade per year until all four years of high school were housed. The first graduating class graduated in 2014.
