= 2019 Erie County, New York Executive election =

2019 Erie County Executive election
- November 5, 2019

Nominee	Mark Poloncarz	Lynne Dixon
Party	Democratic	Republican
Alliance	Working Families	Parties: Conservative; Independence; SAM
Popular vote	114,102	98,415
Percentage	53.69%	46.31%
County Executive before election
Mark Poloncarz
Democratic
Elected County Executive
Mark Poloncarz
Democratic

The 2019 Erie County, New York Executive election took place on November 3, 2019, to select the County Executive of Erie County, New York. Incumbent Democratic County Executive Mark Poloncarz ran for re-election to a third term. He was challenged by County Legislator Lynne Dixon, a member of the Independence Party who caucused won the Republican nomination.

Dixon won a contested primary for the Independence Party's nomination, and received the nomination of the Conservative Party, as well as the Serve America Movement, which was formed to support former Syracuse Mayor Stephanie Miner's 2018 third-party campaign for Governor.

The race was viewed by observers as indicative of voter attitudes in advance of the 2020 United States presidential election given that the area "is culturally, economically, and geographically closer to places like Ohio and Michigan than it is to New York City."

Poloncarz ultimately defeated Dixon, winning 54 percent of the vote, becoming the first County Executive to win a third term since Dennis Gorski in 1995.

== Democratic nomination ==
Poloncarz announced that he would seek a third term, and attorney Peter Reese, a supporter of Bernie Sanders's 2016 presidential campaign, announced that he would challenge him in the Democratic primary. However, the Erie County Board of Elections concluded that Reese had not submitted enough valid petitions, a decision that was affirmed by Supreme Court Justice Christopher Burns. Though Reese appealed the ruling, he ultimately did not appear on the ballot and Poloncarz won the nomination unopposed.

== Republican nomination ==
Republicans sought to recruit County Clerk Chris Jacobs to run against Poloncarz, despite his refusal to run in 2007 and 2015. Jacobs again declined to launch a campaign, and Independence Party County Legislator Lynne Dixon ultimately announced that she would seek the nomination. Dixon won the nomination unopposed.

== Independence Party primary ==
=== Candidates ===
- Lynne Dixon, County Legislator
- Grace Christiansen, registered nurse at John R. Oishei Children's Hospital

==== Dropped out ====
- Rachel Obenauer

=== Campaign ===
Dixon, a member of the Independence Party, sought the party's nomination for County Executive. The Erie County Democratic Committee sought to recruit a candidate to challenge Dixon in the primary, forcing Dixon to spend time and campaign funds winning the nomination. Activists connected to the party collected petitions for Rachel Obenauer, who subsequently declined the nomination, enabling a vacancy committee to select a replacement candidate.

Grace Christiansen, a nurse, was ultimately put forward as the replacement candidate, and appeared on the ballot with Dixon. Dixon won the primary in a landslide, receiving 84 percent of the vote.

=== Results ===
Independence Party primary results
Party	Candidate	Votes	%
Independence	Lynne Dixon	1,581	84.05%
Independence	Grace Christiansen	300	15.95%
Total votes		1,881	100.00%

== General election ==
=== Candidates ===
- Mark Poloncarz, Incumbent County Executive (Democratic, Working Families)
- Lynne Dixon, County Legislator (Republican, Conservative, Independence, SAM)

=== Polling ===
Poll source	Date(s) administered	Sample size (Note: Key: A – all adults RV – registered voters LV – likely voters CV – certain voters V – unclear)	Margin of error	Mark Poloncarz (D)	Lynne Dixon (R)	Other / Undecided
co/efficient	June 11–12, 2019	1,325 (LV)	± 3.5%	42%	40%	18%

=== Results ===
2019 Erie County Executive election
Party	Candidate	Votes	%
Democratic	Mark Poloncarz	105,177	49.49%
Working Families	Mark Poloncarz	8,925	4.20%
Total	Mark Poloncarz (inc.)	114,102	53.69%
Republican	Lynne Dixon	68,923	32.43%
Conservative	Lynne Dixon	23,613	11.11%
Independence	Lynne Dixon	5,661	2.66%
SAM	Lynne Dixon	218	0.10%
Total	Lynne Dixon	98,415	46.31%
Total votes		212,517	100.00%
Democratic hold			
