= David Harker =

American medical researcher

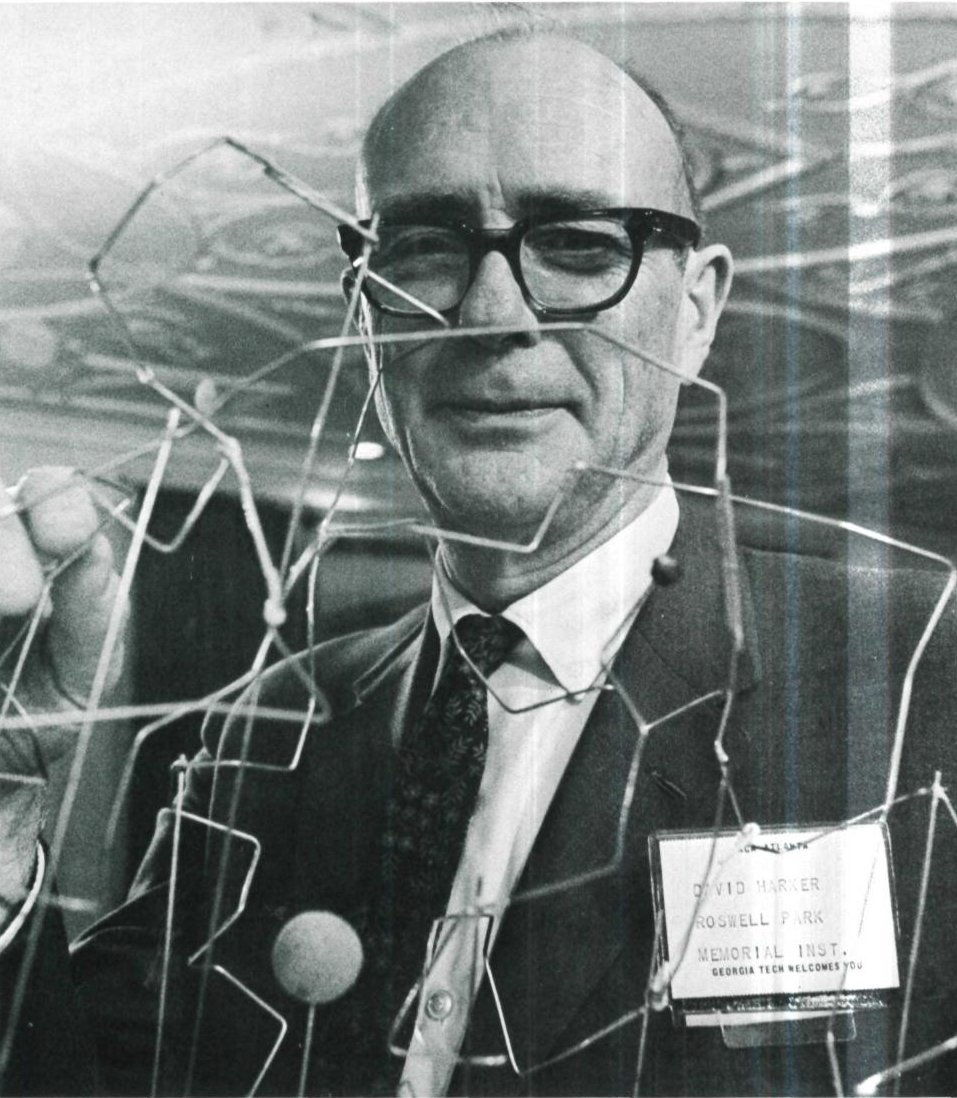
- Harker in 1967
- Born: October 19, 1906
- Died: February 27, 1991 (aged 84)
- Known for: Harker–Kasper inequalities
- Awards: Gregori Aminoff Prize, 1984
- Scientific career
- Fields: Chemical crystallography
- Institutions: Polytechnic Institute of Brooklyn, Roswell Park Comprehensive Cancer Center, General Electric, Hauptman-Woodward Medical Research Institute

David Harker (October 19, 1906 – February 27, 1991) was an American medical researcher who according to The New York Times was "a pioneer in the use of X-rays to decipher the structure of critical substances in the life process of cells".

He is also well known for Harker–Kasper inequalities (statistical relationships between the phases of structure factors), which he devised in collaboration with John S. Kasper. Harker made seminal discoveries in the field of chemical crystallography.

His lab solved the structure of the pancreatic enzyme ribonuclease A, the third protein structure ever solved by protein crystallography. Harker was a member of the National Academy of Sciences, director of the protein structure program at the Polytechnic Institute of Brooklyn, director of the Center for Crystallographic Research at Roswell Park Comprehensive Cancer Center, and the head of the crystallography division of General Electric. After retirement from Roswell Park in 1976, he joined the Hauptman-Woodward Medical Research Institute (HWI), then known as the Medical Foundation of Buffalo. He remained there until he died in 1991. His research interests while at HWI turned towards mathematical aspects of crystallography, including magnetic space groups and infinite polyhedra.

Harker was awarded the Gregori Aminoff Prize from the Swedish Academy in 1984. He was also elected president of the Electron Microscope Society of America.
