= Women and Children's Hospital of Buffalo =

- Kaleida Health
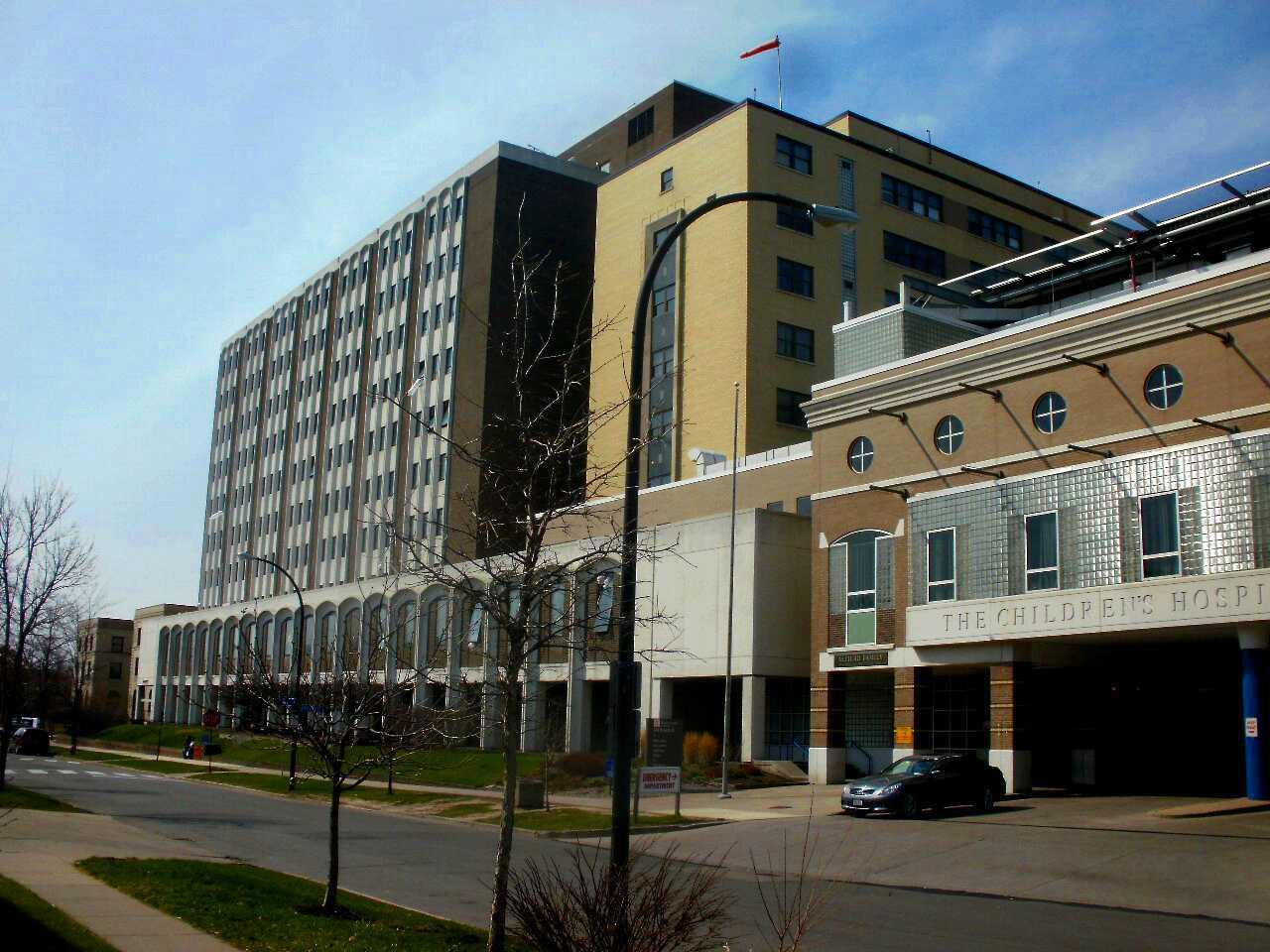

Geography
- Location: Buffalo, New York, United States
- Coordinates: 42.90927°N 78.87494°W

Organization
- Care system: Private
- Type: Teaching
- Affiliated university: State University of New York at Buffalo

Services
- Emergency department: Level I Pediatric Trauma Center
- Beds: 200 (pediatric); 75 (maternity & nursery)
- Speciality: Pediatrics and pediatric subspecialities

Helipads
- Helipad: Yes

History
- Founded: May 1892
- Closed: November 2017

Links
- Website: www.kaleidahealth.org/childrens/
- Lists: Hospitals in New York State

The Women and Children's Hospital of Buffalo was a children's hospital active from 1892 to 2017 in Buffalo, New York. It was a pediatric facility serving patients in Western New York and parts of Southern Ontario. It was a teaching hospital loosely affiliated with the State University of New York at Buffalo. The hospital treated infants, children, teens, and young adults aged 0–21 and also had extensive women's health facilities.

== History ==
Dr. Mahlon Bainbridge Folwell believed strongly that hospitalized children would recuperate more quickly if they were treated and housed separately from adults, and suggested that children should also be treated with different equipment and different medications. In 1891, Dr. Folwell convinced Mrs. Gibson T. Williams and her daughter Miss Martha Tenney Williams of this, and in turn they purchased a vacant property on Bryant Street in Buffalo, New York, and adapted the building to hospital use. "The Children’s Hospital of Buffalo" was incorporated in May of 1892, and opened in September of that year, with Dr. Folwell as the first attending physician. During the first year of operation, so many patients were turned away for lack of space that in 1893 the hospital was forced to increase the capacity by 40 beds. During the next few decades, the hospital renovated and added modern medical equipment, and by the 1950s, hospital had about 200 pediatric beds and 75 beds for women and bassinets. Over the years the hospital was recognized many times by U.S. News & World Report for its leading national pediatric programs. After a merger with Kaleida Health, the facility was renamed Women & Children's Hospital of Buffalo (WCHOB). The hospital was then closed in 2017 when the newly built Golisano Children's Hospital of Buffalo opened on the Buffalo Niagara Medical Campus (about one mile or 1.6 km from WCHOB).
