= Leonard Egede =

Nigerian American physician and scientist

Leonard E. Egede
- Born: Nigeria
- Education: University of Benin (MBBS); Medical University of South Carolina (MS)
- Occupations: Physician, researcher, academic administrator
- Employer: University at Buffalo
- Known for: Health equity and health disparities; structural drivers of health outcomes; behavioral interventions to address health inequalities
- Title: Charles and Mary Bauer Endowed Professor and Chair of Medicine; President and CEO of UBMD Internal Medicine; SUNY Distinguished Professor

Leonard E. Egede is a Nigerian-American physician-scientist and academic administrator. He is a State University of New York (SUNY) Distinguished Professor. He holds the Charles and Mary Bauer Endowed Chair and serves as the Chair of the Department of Medicine at the University at Buffalo Jacobs School of Medicine and Biomedical Sciences. He is also President and Chief Executive Officer of UBMD Internal Medicine. In 2024, he was selected by the National Institutes of Health (NIH) to deliver the Robert S. Gordon Jr. Lecture in Epidemiology. He was also elected as a member of the Association of American Physicians (AAP) in 2024. His research focuses on health equity, health disparities, the structural determinants of health outcomes, and behavioral interventions for diabetes and chronic conditions.

== Education and Training ==
Egede received his medical degree (MBBS) from the University of Benin Faculty of Medicine in Nigeria in 1990. He completed his residency training in internal medicine at the Greater Baltimore Medical Center in Maryland in 1999, where he also served as chief resident. He subsequently completed a Health Services Research Fellowship at the Medical University of South Carolina in 2001, where he also earned a Master of Science in Clinical Research.

== Career ==
=== Medical University of South Carolina ===
Egede joined the faculty of the Medical University of South Carolina (MUSC) in 1999. He served as Director of the Center for Health Disparities Research and held the Allen H. Johnson Endowed Chair. Egede also directed the Charleston Health Equity and Rural Outreach Innovation Center (HEROIC), a Veterans Health Administration Health Services Research and Development program. In addition, he served as deputy editor for the Journal of General Internal Medicine from 2004-2009.

=== Medical College of Wisconsin ===
In 2017, Egede transitioned to the Medical College of Wisconsin (MCW), where he was appointed Chief of the Division of General Internal Medicine and Director of the Center for Advancing Population Science (CAPS). He was also named the Inaugural Milwaukee Community Chair in Health Equity Research.

=== University at Buffalo ===
Egede relocated to the University at Buffalo Jacobs School of Medicine and Biomedical Sciences in 2024 to serve as Chair of the Department of Medicine. He also holds the Charles and Mary Bauer Endowed Chair and serves as President and Chief Executive Officer of the UBMD Internal Medicine physicians' group. In these roles, he directs the academic, clinical, and clinical research strategies of the department and practice plan. In 2026, the State University of New York system named Egede a SUNY Distinguished Professor, the highest academic rank within the system.

== Research ==
Egede's research centers on the mechanisms, outcomes, and interventions related to health disparities, utilizing diabetes and other chronic conditions as models to study how social, behavioral, and structural variables dictate health outcomes. His methodology integrates epidemiology, health services research, randomized clinical trials, and implementation science across the domains of health equity, structural drivers of health, and behavioral interventions.

=== Health Equity and Structural Drivers of Health ===
Egede's research examines how upstream structural factors influence downstream social determinants, healthcare access, and chronic disease outcomes. His work includes investigations into the relationship between historical systemic policies and modern health inequities, including studies linking historical residential redlining to contemporary food insecurity, housing instability, and mortality risks.

During the COVID-19 pandemic, Egede focused on the intersections of structural racism, social risk factors, and the burden of COVID-19 infection. In a 2020 New England Journal of Medicine perspective paper, he detailed how longstanding socio-economic inequities drove increased disease burdens among Black Americans. This framework was supported by subsequent empirical research analyzing racial and ethnic disparities in COVID-19 screening, hospitalization, and mortality rates within Southeast Wisconsin. In 2023, Egede and colleagues published a review in Diabetes Care outlining the pathways through which structural racism acts as an upstream driver of diabetes outcomes. His epidemiological work also tracks how food insecurity, financial hardship, and neighborhood conditions impact glycemic control and cardiovascular disease risk factors.

=== Behavioral and Healthcare Delivery Interventions ===
Egede's research evaluates behavioral and digital healthcare delivery models designed to mitigate disparities in chronic disease management. His research includes randomized controlled trials leveraging technology to bridge gaps in care for vulnerable populations. In a clinical trial published in The Lancet Psychiatry, Egede and colleagues evaluated the efficacy and feasibility of using telemedicine-delivered psychotherapy to treat depression among older military veterans.

In diabetes care, Egede has studied telephone-delivered behavioral skills training, technology-assisted case management, and multi-component interventions pairing clinical care with behavioral and social supports. His research incorporates behavioral economics to evaluate how concepts like delay discounting and delay aversion correlate with clinical diabetes outcomes. Furthermore, he has run trials evaluating the cost-effectiveness of combining financial incentives with nurse coaching to improve glycemic control. In 2022, Egede co-authored a review in Health Affairs evaluating the policy landscape of nonmedical interventions and systemic approaches designed to address the social and behavioral determinants of type 2 diabetes.

== Honors and Recognition ==
In 2024, Egede was selected by the National Institutes of Health (NIH) to deliver the Robert S. Gordon Lecture in Epidemiology as part of the NIH Director's Wednesday Afternoon Lecture Series. He was also elected as a member of the Association of American Physicians (AAP) in 2024. In 2026, the State University of New York (SUNY) Board of Trustees appointed Egede to the rank of SUNY Distinguished Professor, the highest academic title within the university system.

== Books ==
Egede is the editor of Structural Inequalities and Health Outcomes for Chronic Disease, an academic volume published by Elsevier in 2025. The text compiles research examining the intersections of structural inequities, socio-economic conditions, and chronic disease management.
