= Roswell Park =

American surgeon (1852–1914)

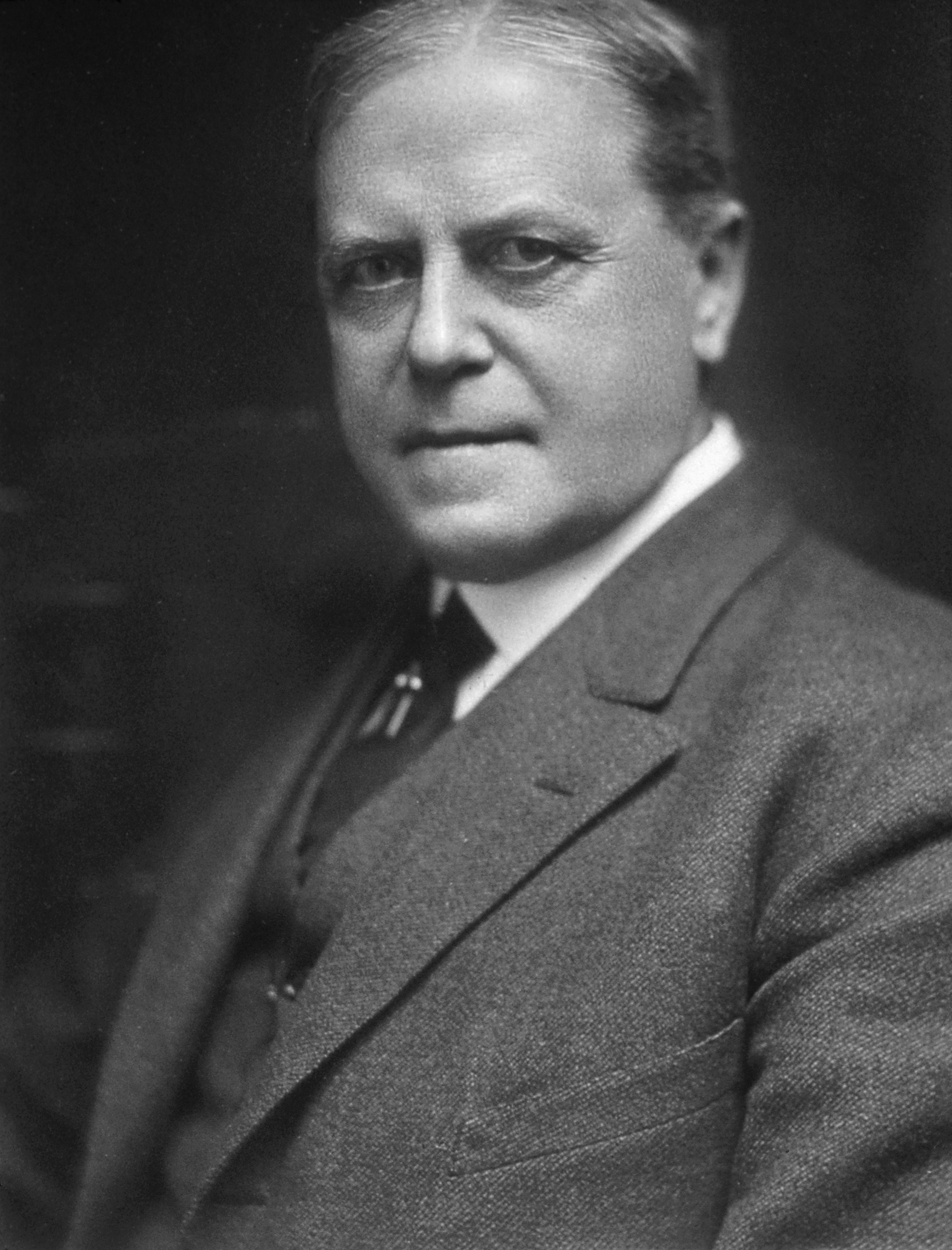
- Born: May 4, 1852; Pomfret, Connecticut, U.S.
- Died: February 15, 1914 (aged 61)
- Education: Northwestern University (MD); Harvard University (MA)

Roswell Park (May 4, 1852 – February 15, 1914) was an American physician and cancer researcher, best known for starting Gratwick Research Laboratory in 1898, which is now known as Roswell Park Comprehensive Cancer Center.

== Biography ==
Roswell Park was born on May 4, 1852, in Pomfret, Connecticut, to Rev. Roswell Park and Mary Brewster Baldwin, daughter of Colonel Benjamin Franklin Baldwin. His grandmother, Mary Carter Coolidge, was later married to manufacturer Burrage Yale after Col. Baldwin's death.

In 1883, when Park was thirty-one, he went to Buffalo, New York. He came from Chicago where he received his Doctor of Medicine degree from Northwestern University in 1876. He received his B.A. in 1872 and M.A. in 1875 from Racine College in Racine, Wisconsin.

He then went on to finish his Doctor of Medicine studies at the Northwestern University School of Medicine in 1876. Park received an honorary M.A. from Harvard University in 1895 and an honorary LL.D. from Yale University. Over the years he served on many boards, both national and international. By 1914, the total number of textbooks, articles, and monographs that he wrote reached 167.

In 1900, the Gratwick family of Buffalo helped to finance Park's laboratory with a $25,000 donation in memory of William Henry Gratwick, a patient of Park's. Park was also a professor of surgery at the University at Buffalo Medical School and a surgeon at Buffalo General Hospital.

Park was an advocate of the parasitic theory of cancer and claimed that it was the only theory "which satisfies the needs of both the pathologist and the clinician". However, most of the medical community were unconvinced of the parasitic theory as no cancer parasite was detected.

== President McKinley assassination ==
Buffalo was the host of the Pan-American Exposition in 1901. That September, President William McKinley, less than a year into his second term, was giving a speech at the Temple of Music on the Exposition grounds when Leon Czolgosz came from the crowd and shot him twice at point-blank range. McKinley was taken to a hospital on the fairgrounds.

It took nearly 40 minutes for the first surgeon to show up. Herman Mynter, a general surgeon from Buffalo, was the first to diagnose the president. Not long after Mynter's examination was finished, Matthew Derbyshire Mann arrived. After the two talked, it was agreed upon to perform the abdominal exploration. President McKinley agreed to the exploration. Work was done by Mann to try to find the bullet and treat the wounds.

Efforts were made to contact Park, but he was in the middle of a neck dissection at Niagara Falls Memorial Hospital. As described years later by Park's son, the messenger ran into the operation room and told Park that he was needed immediately. Park is claimed to have replied "Don't you see, I can't leave. I am in the middle of a case even if it were for the President of the United States?"; the messenger replied, "Doctor, it is for the President of the United States." Park proceeded to finish the operation.

Despite the importance of the situation, Park was only able to get to the exposition hospital via a train. The train engine and coal car sent to Niagara Falls to pick him up and return to Buffalo held the record time between the two points at that time. The train was driven by Charles Meyers and was the only train allowed into the Pan Am. Meyers was known after that as Pan American Charlie.

Once Park arrived, Mann was about to close up McKinley and asked Park if there should be any placement of drains. Park told Mann that he was the best man to make that decision given the scenario. Mann decided not to drain the abdomen since there was no excess blood or fluid around to be drained.

Park arranged for some nurses from the exposition to look over McKinley at the Milburn home until nurses from the army could arrive. Despite some promising results McKinley died in the Milburn home.

== Selected publications ==
- An Inquiry into the Etiology of Cancer (1898)
- Parasitic Theory of Cancer (1899)
- Again the Question of Cancer (1900)
- The principles and practice of modern surgery (1907)
