= Great Lakes Health System =

Healthcare system for Western New York

Great Lakes Health System is a healthcare system for Western New York and it includes Kaleida Health, the University at Buffalo, Erie County Medical Center and physicians throughout the community. It was primarily created as a result of the merger between Kaleida Health and the Erie County Medical Center.
