= Hauptman-Woodward Medical Research Institute =

Biomedical research facility in Buffalo, New York

- Abbreviation: HWI
- Formation: 1956
- Founder: Dr. George F. Koepf, Helen Woodward Rivas
- Type: Non-profit
- Location: Buffalo, New York
- Key people: Edward H. Snell (CSO)
- Staff: 75 (approx.)
- Website: http://www.hwi.buffalo.edu/
- Formerly called: Medical Foundation of Buffalo

The Hauptman-Woodward Medical Research Institute (HWI) was an independent, not-for-profit, biomedical research facility located in the Buffalo Niagara Medical Campus affiliated with the University at Buffalo. Its focus is on structural biology with a strong history in methods development and the application of X-ray crystallography in fundamental studies.. In 2025 it merged with the University at Buffalo.

== Medical research ==
HWI scientists work to find the fundamental causes of many diseases. For example, cancer is being attacked by identifying new classes of anti-tumor agents including new inhibitors for hormone-dependent breast tumors. Other projects include:

- Finding new ways to fight opportunistic infections in AIDS patients
- Combating inflammation in arthritis and cardiovascular disease
- Preventing bronchial infections in cystic fibrosis patients

HWI scientists use a methodology known as structural biology, which allows them to create 3D models of the molecules that build up cells. The investigation results provide many insights into how these molecular machines work, including the starting points for the design of better drugs. HWI is also focused to developing highly trained researchers and in its role as the Department of Structural and Computational Biology for the University at Buffalo, the Institute typically trains about a dozen PhD students and sponsors internship programs for high school and college students.

== History ==
The Hauptman-Woodward Medical Research Institute was founded in 1956 as the "Medical Foundation of Buffalo" and came into existence through the combined efforts of Dr. George F. Koepf, who provided the vision, and Helen Woodward Rivas, who provided generous financial support. Koepf was a physician and endocrinologist whose interest in research began during his second year at medical school and continued at Johns Hopkins University. After leaving Johns Hopkins, he returned to practice medicine in Buffalo and became a founding member of the Buffalo Medical Group. One of his patients, Helen Woodward Rivas, expressed great interest in funding a medical research effort in Buffalo. Through her $3 million (equivalent to $35,526,000 in 2025) gift, the Medical Foundation (MFB) came into being.

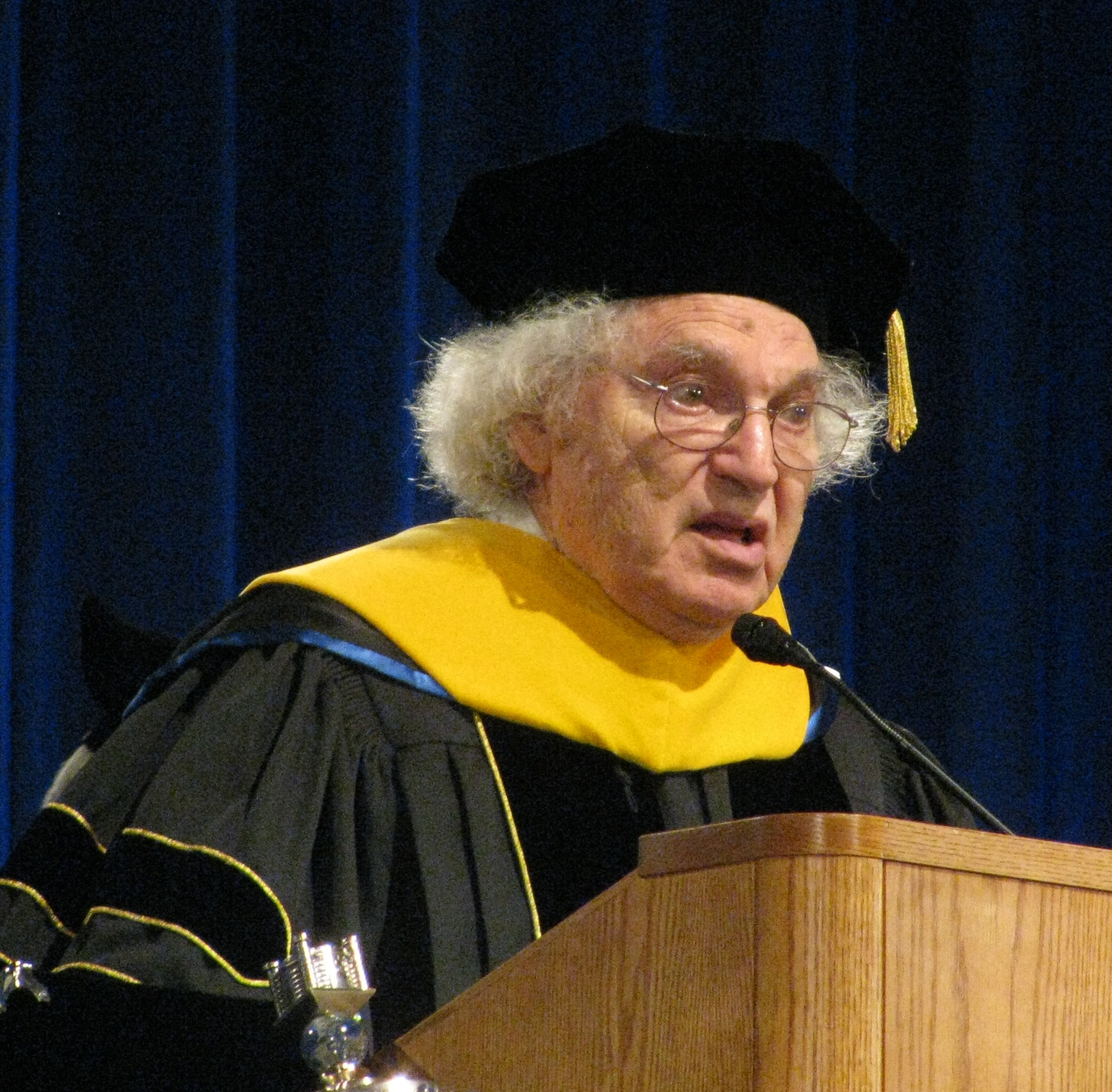
Herbert Hauptman at University of Buffalo graduation in 2009

An example of the basic research carried out includes studying disease processes at the molecular scale. For example, it was reported that a researcher at the Hauptman-Woodward Medical Research Institute had moved a step closer to a cure, and possibly the prevention, of the most common type of breast cancer.

In 1994, the Medical Foundation was renamed the Hauptman-Woodward Medical Research Institute. The name "Hauptman" comes from Herbert A. Hauptman, who pioneered mathematical techniques for determining atomic structure from X-ray diffraction. For this discovery, Hauptman and Jerome Karle were awarded the Nobel prize in chemistry in 1985.

In 1999, the Institute received a three-year $1.5 million (equivalent to $2,899,000 in 2025) challenge grant from the John R. Oishei Foundation along with a $750,000 (equivalent to $1,450,000 in 2025) award from the Margaret L. Wendt Foundation that established a Structural Biology Center at HWI. All aspects of structural research from isolating the gene that codes for a protein of interest to applying the latest crystallographic methods are now possible here. Through this Center, HWI scientists were able to create new and improved crystal growth methods including the development of a novel and patented high-throughput robotic crystallization technique for expediting and optimizing the crystallization process.

In 2001, BWI became a founding partner of the Buffalo Niagara Medical Campus "BNMC," and created the University at Buffalo Department of Structural Biology. Dr. George DeTitta was appointed Executive Director and CEO and Dr. Walter Pangborn was appointed to Executive Vice President. Shortly thereafter, four new scientists were added. As the University at Buffalo and Roswell Park Comprehensive Cancer Center, both members of BNMC, began plans to construct new facilities, HWI joined to form the Buffalo Life Sciences Complex which is located in the heart of the BNMC adjacent to the UB and Roswell Park sites. CannonDesign was retained along with architect Mehrdad Yazdani to design a research and office complex and construction of the Structural Biology Research Center began in August 2003, through the support of New York State, the Federal Government, local foundations, community leaders, and individuals, as well as financing through KeyBank. BWI moved into the new facility in April 2005, and have since recruited four additional scientists to the facility. In 2025 the Institute merged with the University at Buffalo to become the University at Buffalo Hauptman-Woodward Institute.

=== Leadership ===
On April 1, 2008, George DeTitta stepped down as CEO to return to full-time work in the lab and on July 1, 2008, Eaton E. (Ed) Lattman, formerly a Professor of Biophysics at Johns Hopkins University became HWI's new CEO. Ed was previously the dean of research and graduate education at Hopkins.

On December 1, 2014, Dr. Edward H. Snell was appointed CEO following eight years of service to HWI as a senior research scientist. In 2024, after almost a decade in the position, he transitioned to Chief Scientific Officer. Before joining HWI, Dr. Snell was a staff scientist in NASA’s Structural Biology Laboratory at the Marshall Space Flight Center in Huntsville, Alabama.

=== Awards ===
The institute has sponsored the award "Pioneer of Science". It also runs a popular annual wine tasting event where Riedel glassware is coupled with quality wines and champagne and the influence of the shape of the glass on the taste demonstrated. The link between the glass, wine and research, comes from the use of crystals in the research and the rich information they supply when examined in detail.

== See also ==
- Buffalo Niagara Medical Campus
- Herbert A. Hauptman
