= Gates Vascular Institute =

High-rise medical building in Buffalo, New York, U.S.

- Kaleida Health

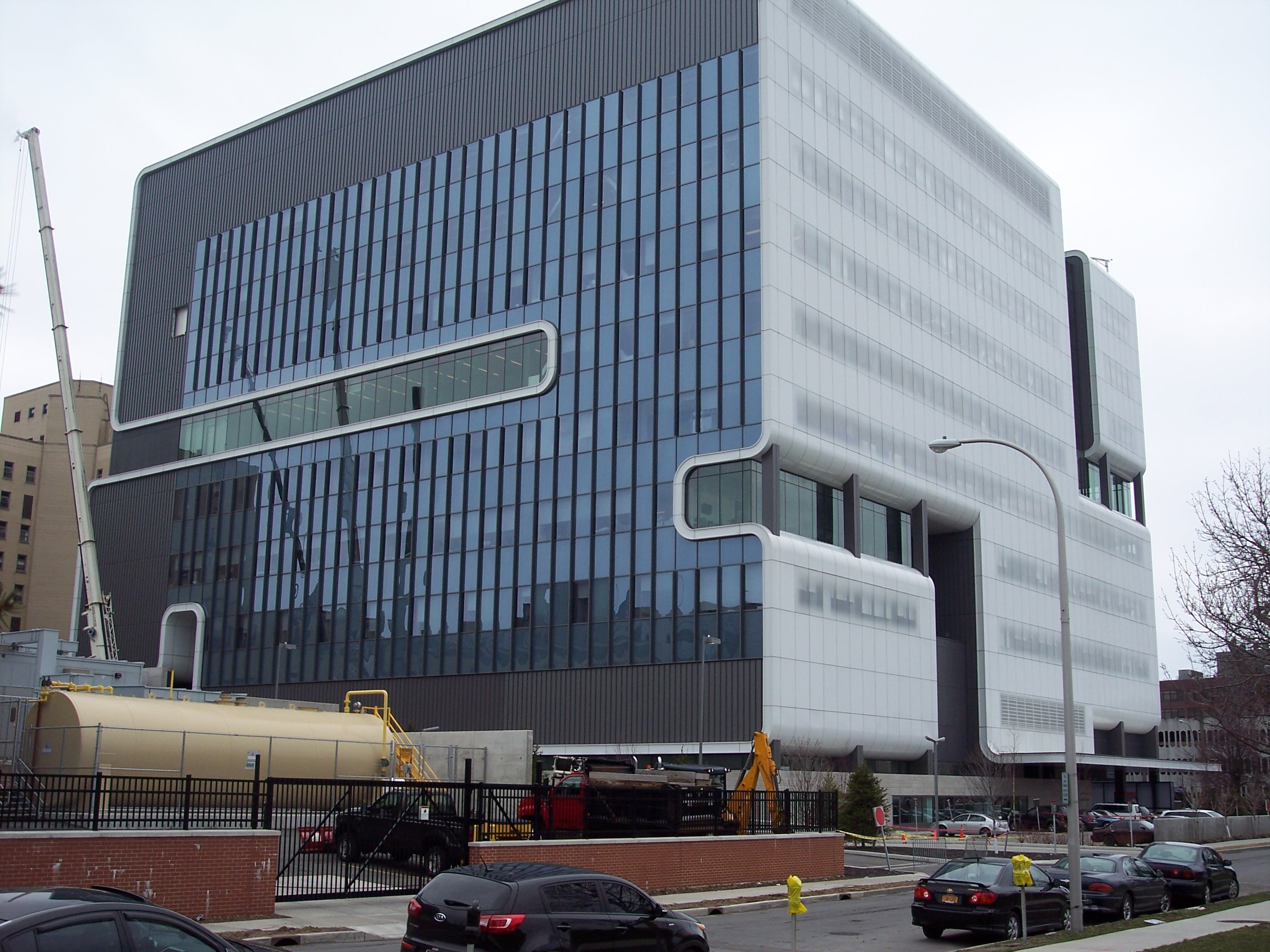
- The newly constructed building.

Geography
- Location: 875 Ellicott Street, Buffalo, New York, United States
- Coordinates: 42.901561°N 78.865970°W

Organization
- Type: stroke care, cardiac surgery, and vascular services
- Affiliated university: Jacobs School of Medicine and Biomedical Sciences

Services
- Emergency department: Yes (With Buffalo General)

History
- Constructed: 2009
- Opened: 2012

Links
- Website: www.kaleidahealth.org/gvi
- Lists: Hospitals in New York State

The Gates Vascular Institute and the University at Buffalo's Clinical and Translational Research Center is a 10-story building at 875 Ellicott St, Buffalo, New York. The Institute is next to Buffalo General Medical Center and opened on May 24, 2012. The building was designed by Mehrdad Yazdani of CannonDesign and offers services for stroke care, cardiac surgery, and vascular services. Project costs were approximately $290,000,000.

== Building design ==
The first four floors of this 10-story 476,000 square feet vertical campus, house the Gates Vascular Institute, with the Clinical and Translational Research Center occupying the top half of the building. The facility's structure and its engineering systems are based on the "Universal Grid," a minimally invasive approach to future modifications built into the building fabric intended to accommodate future changes. By adopting the Universal Grid approach, different spaces throughout the facility become capable of supporting a variety of functions.

The Universal Grid consists of three 10'6" building modules that create a 31'6" x 31'6" structural grid—in conjunction with an 18' floor-to-floor height. The Universal Grid's open plan is easily adaptable to changing equipment and service offerings. This approach facilities the installation of new technologies and conversion of building zones, as future needs determine, to entirely different functions without the modification of core infrastructure systems (mechanical, electrical and plumbing systems).

The combined buildings of the Gates Vascular Institute and Buffalo General Medical Center house a new emergency department, a new helipad, 610 beds, 28 operating rooms, 17 interventional labs, four CT scanners and four MRIs.

== Awards ==
The Gates Vascular Institute designed by Mehrdad Yazdani and the Yazdani Studio of CannonDesign won the 2013 AIA Healthcare Design Award Recipient from the American Institute of Architects. The jury stated the building "possesses unique design and planning concepts that demonstrate a great deal of innovation. It is really well integrated, highly thoughtful design. The forms are expressive of the collaboration that is to take place here. It clearly expresses an idea. This project begins to push the boundaries of hospital programming and the isolation of function based spaces. By appropriating some lessons from an activity based workplace the team creates overlapping and shared spaces to challenge conventional hierarchies in health center planning."

== See also ==
- Architecture of Buffalo, New York
- Buffalo Niagara Medical Campus
- Kaleida Health
- CannonDesign
- List of tallest buildings in Buffalo, New York
