= Jacobs School of Medicine and Biomedical Sciences =

Medical school of the University of Buffalo, New York, US

Coordinates: 42.953168°N 78.815655°W

University at Buffalo School of Medicine and Biomedical Sciences
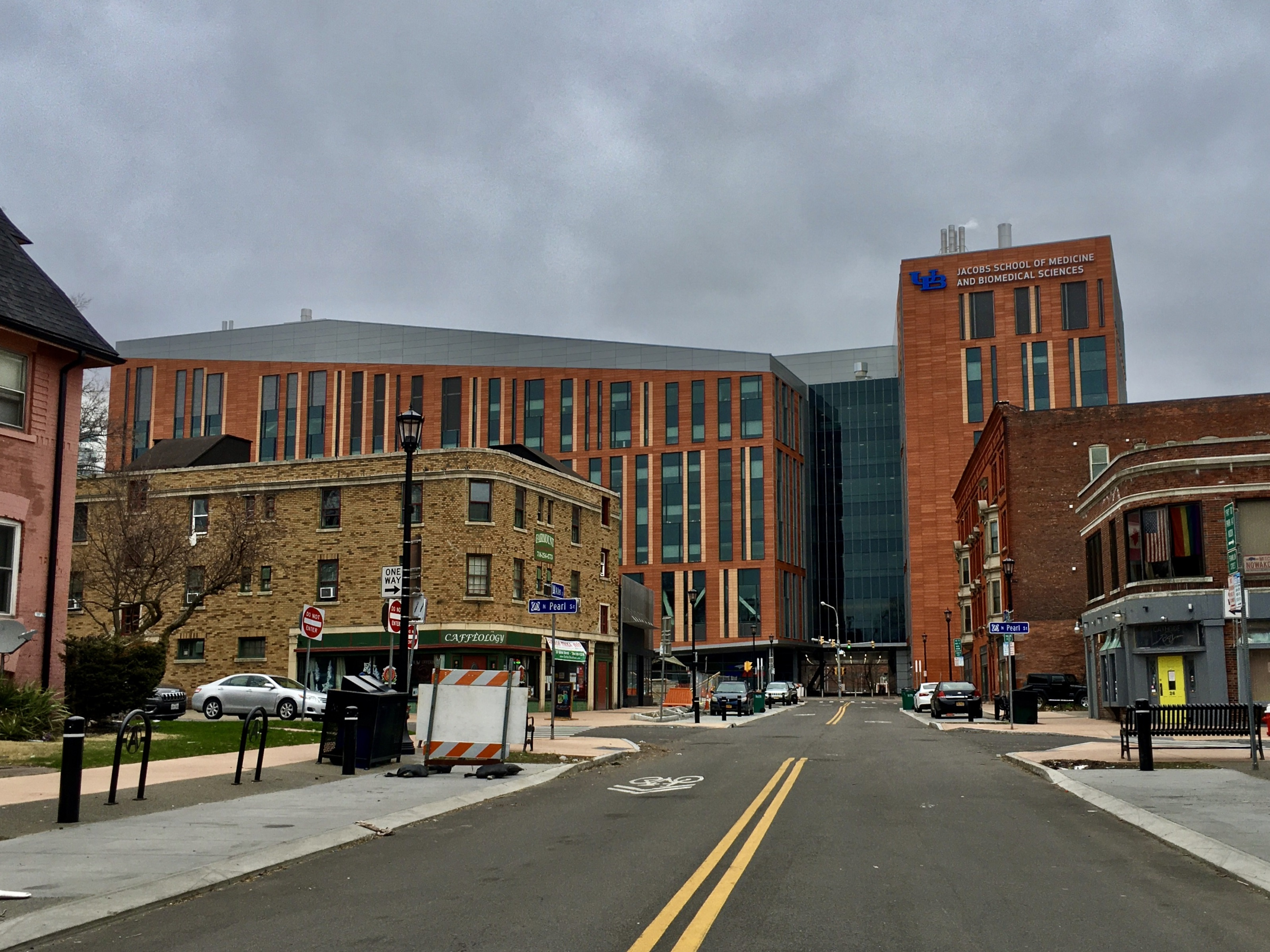
- Jacobs School of Medicine
- Type: Public Medical school
- Established: 1846; 180 years ago
- Parent institution: University at Buffalo, State University of New York
- Location: Buffalo, NY, U.S.
- Website: medicine.buffalo.edu

University at Buffalo School of Medicine and Biomedical Sciences, also known as Jacobs School of Medicine and Biomedical Sciences, is a public medical school in the city of Buffalo, New York, at the University at Buffalo. Founded in 1846, it is one of the oldest medical schools in the United States and is the only medical school in Buffalo. It is part of the State University of New York (SUNY) system.

It offers degrees in various field such as Biomedical Sciences undergraduate majors, Biotechnical and Clinical, Laboratory Sciences, Master's programs in Biomedical Sciences, PhD programs in Biomedical Sciences, MD program, Graduate Medical Education residency program, Continuing Medical Education, postdoctoral programs, as well as dual-degree programs.

== History ==
The school was established by U.S. President Millard Fillmore in 1846. Buffalo was a boomtown on the Erie Canal and the gateway to the West. Leading citizens — primarily physicians and lawyers — proposed that an institution of higher learning be established, which led to the founding of the private, nonsectarian University of Buffalo. The Medical School, or Medical Department, as it was called, was the first decanal unit within the university, and 40 years passed before other departments were added. Medical classes began February 24, 1847, with an enrollment of 66 students. The medical school's first permanent location was next to Buffalo General Hospital in downtown Buffalo. In 1893, the school relocated to High Street in the city, where it remained until 1953, when it moved to the university's South Campus. It moved in 2017 to a new campus on High and Main Streets, again adjacent to the Buffalo General Hospital complex.

In 1962, University of Buffalo merged with the State University of New York (SUNY) system. The Medical School then became the School of Medicine, State University of New York at Buffalo.

Throughout its history, the university has not owned or operated a teaching hospital, but instead has instructed students in affiliated hospitals throughout the city. Today's network of teaching affiliations was formalized in 1983 as the Graduate Medical Dental Education Consortium of Buffalo.

In 2015, the school's name was changed to Jacobs School of Medicine and Biomedical Sciences at the University at Buffalo in response to a $30 million donation by the Jacobs family. The Jacobs family includes Jeremy Jacobs, the owner of the Boston Bruins. Before that, in 1987, the school's name was changed to the School of Medicine and Biomedical Sciences in recognition of the basic sciences underpinning medical knowledge. Today, the school enrolls 180 medical students each year, 133 PhD students, 28 MD/PhD students, 71 master's students and 435 undergraduates.

Currently, the school is located at the Buffalo Niagara Medical Campus/University at Buffalo's downtown campus as of the Spring of 2018.

In 2025, the school partnered with Rochester Institute of Technology (RIT) to offer a pre-admission program to the Jacobs school for eligible RIT students to gain medical training during their undergraduate at RIT.

== Hospital and research affiliations ==
UB has affiliations with almost every major hospital in the city of Buffalo for its educational and research objectives. These include:

- Buffalo General Medical Center-Located on the Buffalo Niagara Medical Campus, Buffalo General Medical Center offers a wide spectrum of clinical inpatient and outpatient treatment programs.
- John R. Oishei Children's Hospital-This regional center for specialized pediatric and women's health care has achieved national recognition and is ranked among the top 20 pediatric hospitals in the nation by U.S. News & World Report.
- Millard Fillmore Suburban Hospital- this 200-bed community hospital supports residency training programs in anesthesiology, emergency medicine, general surgery, urology, obstetrics and gynecology, and family practice.
- DeGraff Memorial Hospital-A 70-bed community hospital primarily serving the needs of patients in towns north of Buffalo.
- Erie County Medical Center-This 550-bed medical center serves as a regional center for trauma, burns, rehabilitation and cardiac care.
- Veterans Affairs Western New York Healthcare System-The Buffalo VA Medical Center provides inpatient and outpatient programs. It is the main referral center for cardiac surgery, cardiology and comprehensive cancer care for Western New York and northern Pennsylvania.
- Sisters of Charity Hospital- Buffalo's first hospital and a Designated Stroke Center, Sisters of Charity Hospital serves patients in its inpatient and outpatient facilities.
- Mercy Hospital of Buffalo-Mercy Hospital is a Center of Excellence for Stroke and Cardiac Care. It recently revamped emergency department is a model for emergency health-care treatment.
- Roswell Park Comprehensive Cancer Center - A National Cancer Institute-designated comprehensive cancer center.

== Rankings and selectivity ==
U.S. News & World Report ranked the School of Medicine 74th (2022–23) in the Best Research category and 90th (2022–23) in the Primary Care category nationally.

In 2020, the MD program received over 6,100 applications for 182 seats. The incoming class had an average GPA of 3.75 and MCAT score of 512, which is the 85th percentile nationally. Over 87.4% matriculants were NYS residents, the remaining 12.6% were "out of state".
