= Erie County Medical Center =

- Erie County Medical Center Corporation
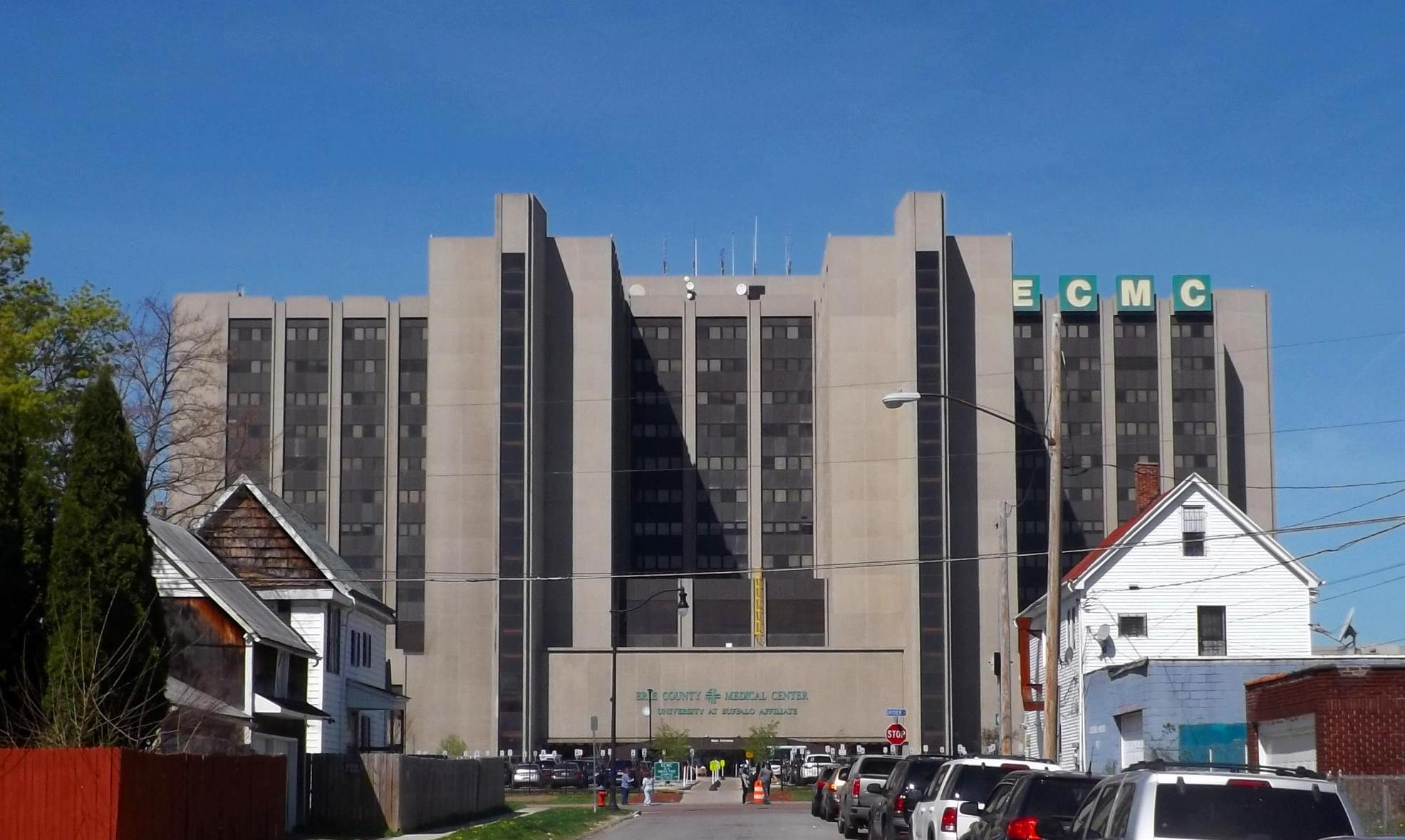

Geography
- Location: 462 Grider Street; Buffalo, New York, U.S.
- Coordinates: 42.925776°N 78.831646°W

Organisation
- Affiliated university: University at Buffalo
- Network: Great Lakes Health System of New York

Services
- Emergency department: Level I trauma center
- Beds: 550 inpatient

Helipads
- Helipad: (FAA LID: 6NK5)
Number	Length		Surface
Number	ft	m	Surface
H1	45x45	14x14	mats

History
- Founded: 1912

Links
- Website: http://www.ecmc.edu/
- Lists: Hospitals in U.S.

Erie County Medical Center (ECMC) is a hospital with 550 beds located in the East Side of Buffalo, New York and a member of the Great Lakes Health System. It is the primary teaching hospital for the University at Buffalo. It is also a New York State public-benefit corporation.

== Organization ==
The Erie County Medical Center Corporation, as it is known when filing financial reports to the New York State Comptroller and the New York State Authorities Budget Office, is guided by a 19-member board of directors, 4 of whom are non-voting. There are eight voting members who are appointed by the New York State Governor and there are seven voting members who are appointed by the Erie County Executive. The management team is headed by CEO Thomas J. Quatroche Jr. In 2017, it had operating expenses of $636.03 million, an outstanding debt of $272.51 million, and a staffing level of 4,023 people.

== History ==
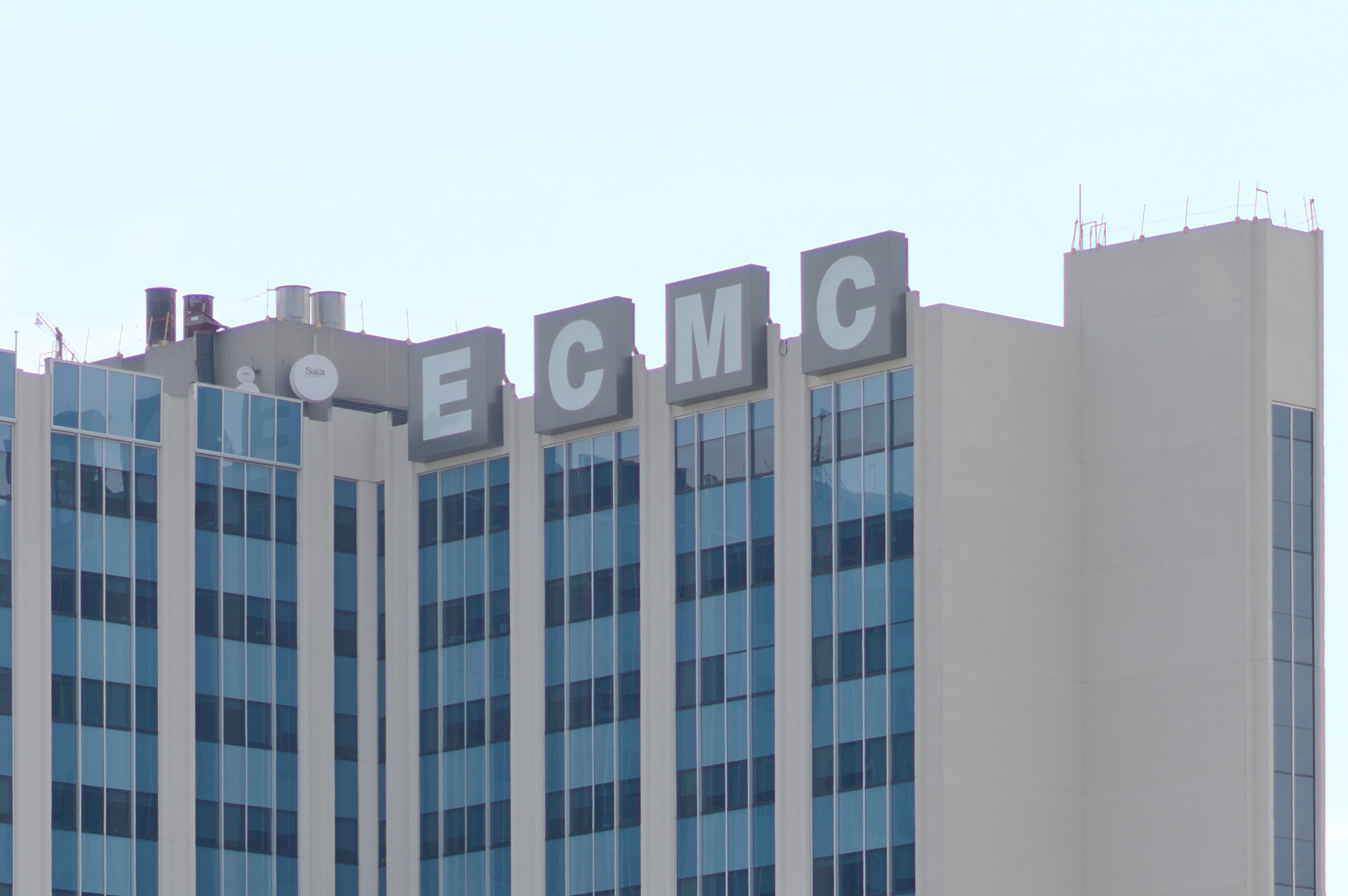
A sign atop ECMC

Erie County Medical Center (then known as Buffalo City Hospital) was formed in 1912 when the nearby Municipal Hospital on East Ferry Street had become overcrowded due to outbreaks in scarlet fever and tuberculosis and opened in 1918. In 1921, ECMC opened its first medical library, and, in 1922, a social services department. The hospital would be named for Dr. Edward J. Meyer, its first chairman, in 1939. The current hospital facility would be opened in 1978 and was renamed Erie County Medical Center. In 1989, it would open its burn treatment center.

== Care and services ==
ECMC is designated as Western New York's designated trauma and HIV/AIDS treatment center. It also features the Roger W. Seibel Burn Treatment Center, which is the regional burn center for Western New York. Buffalo Public Schools' P.S. 84 (Health Care Center for Children @ ECMC), the designated school in the district for students with severe disabilities/illnesses, is housed at ECMC.

In 2024, the hospital opened its new trauma recovery center called Buffalo Rising Against Violence or BRAVE.

== Cafeteria and patient menu controversies ==
On January 19, 2015, the Buffalo Evening News indicated that a report by the Physicians Committee for Responsible Medicine criticized ECMC for "serving some of the least-healthy food options of any public hospital in the country. The hospital received the fourth-lowest score, out of 200 hospitals reviewed, because it is home to three fast-food restaurants and because its cardiac patient menu has some items that aren’t heart-friendly." In 2019, ECMC replaced the previous food provider, Morrison Healthcare, with Metz Culinary Management. In 2021, ECMC pursued legal action in an attempt to terminate a lease with Benderson Development, and remove the fast-food restaurants from their lobby, in order to replace them with healthier options.

== Relations with other hospitals ==
Under the Great Lakes Health System, ECMC has a vital alliance with Kaleida Health that operates hospitals like Buffalo General Medical Center and Golisano Children's Hospital of Buffalo which is the only level I pediatric trauma center in Western New York. ECMC is the Level I Adult Trauma Center for Western New York so emergency trauma cases from all around the region get sent to ECMC, even ones at different hospitals around the region like Kaleida Health and Catholic Health's facilities around Buffalo and the Southern Tier. Strong Memorial Hospital is the Level I Trauma center for Rochester and the Finger Lakes region, which makes it the closest facility to ECMC that can handle the same stuff at a similar capacity.

== See also ==
- Nassau University Medical Center
- Roswell Park Comprehensive Cancer Center
- Westchester Medical Center University Hospital
- Kaleida Health
- Strong Memorial Hospital
