= 2007 Erie County, New York Executive election =

2007 Erie County Executive election
- November 4, 2007
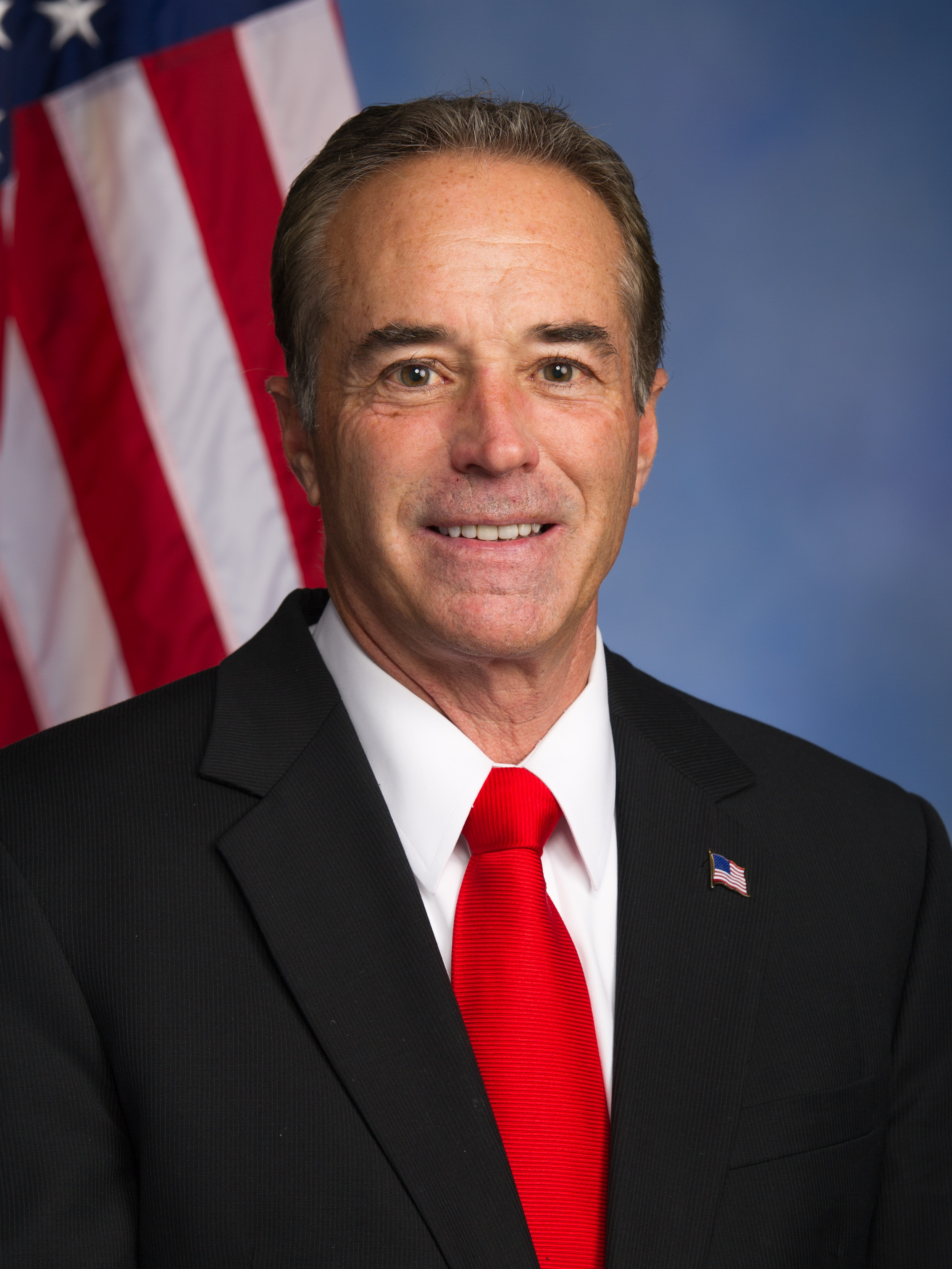

Nominee	Chris Collins	Jim Keane
Party	Republican	Democratic
Alliance	Taxpayers First	Parties: Working Families Party; Conservative
Popular vote	150,767	81,442
Percentage	63.69%	34.41%
County Executive before election
Joel Giambra
Republican
Elected County Executive
Chris Collins
Republican

The 2007 Erie County, New York Executive election took place on November 6, 2007, to select the County Executive of Erie County, New York. Incumbent Republican County Executive Joel Giambra, who faced low approval ratings, declined to seek re-election to a third term.

Both parties sought a "fresh face," and Republicans ultimately nominated businessman Chris Collins. Leonard Lenihan, the Chairman of the Erie County Democratic Party, ultimately endorsed former Deputy County Executive Jim Keane, who served in the administration of former County Executive Dennis Gorski, enabling Keane to win the Democratic primary in a landslide over former Buffalo Mayor James D. Griffin and West Seneca Town Supervisor Paul T. Clark. In the general election, Clark continued his campaign as the Independence Party nominee and Griffin endorsed Collins.

Collins ultimately won in a landslide, receiving 64 percent of the vote to Keane's 34 percent and Clark's 2 percent.

== Democratic primary ==
=== Candidates ===
- Jim Keane, former Deputy County Executive
- James D. Griffin, former Mayor of Buffalo
- Paul T. Clark, West Seneca Town Supervisor

==== Dropped out ====
- Lynn Martinelli, County Legislature Chairwoman
- Dan Ward, Amherst Town Councilman, 2003 Democratic nominee for County Executive

==== Declined ====
- Mark Poloncarz, County Controller

=== Results ===
Democratic primary results
Party	Candidate	Votes	%
Democratic	Jim Keane	30,750	53.38%
Democratic	James D. Griffin	12,516	21.73%
Democratic	Paul T. Clark	14,342	24.90%
Total votes		57,608	100.00%

== Republican nomination ==
Three candidates were considered for the Republican Party nomination: Amherst Town Councilman Bill O'Loughlin, Secretary of State Chris Jacobs, and businessman Chris Collins. Jacobs announced that he would not seek the nomination, and O'Laughlin announced that he would drop his campaign to instead seek the nomination for County Clerk, leaving Collins as the nominee.

== General election ==
=== Candidates ===
- Chris Collins, businessman (Republican, Taxpayers First)
- Jim Keane, former Deputy County Executive (Democratic, Working Families, Conservative)
- Paul T. Clark, West Seneca Town Supervisor (Independence)

=== Results ===
2007 Erie County Executive election
Party	Candidate	Votes	%
Republican	Chris Collins	139,655	59.00%
Taxpayers First	Chris Collins	11,112	4.69%
Total	Chris Collins	150,767	63.69%
Democratic	Jim Keane	71,354	30.15%
Conservative	Jim Keane	3,460	1.46%
Working Families	Jim Keane	6,628	2.80%
Total	Jim Keane	81,442	34.41%
Independence	Paul T. Clark	4,487	1.90%
Total votes		236,696	100.00%
Republican hold			
