= 2003 Erie County, New York Executive election =

2003 Erie County Executive election
- November 4, 2003

Nominee	Joel Giambra	Daniel J. Ward
Party	Republican	Democratic
Alliance	Parties: Conservative; Independence	Working Families
Popular vote	134,305	107,773
Percentage	55.47%	44.53%
County Executive before election
Joel Giambra
Republican
Elected County Executive
Joel Giambra
Republican

The 2003 Erie County, New York Executive election took place on November 4, 2003, to select the County Executive of Erie County, New York. Incumbent Republican County Executive Joel Giambra ran for re-election to a second term, and he was challenged by Amherst Town Councilman Daniel Ward, the Democratic nominee. Gambia ultimately defeated Ward in a landslide, winning 55 percent of the vote to Ward's 45 percent.

== General election ==
=== Candidates ===
- Joel Giambra, incumbent County Executive (Republican, Independence, Conservative)
- Daniel J. Ward, Amherst Town Councilman (Democratic, Working Families)

=== Campaign ===
Giambra, who was viewed as a potential Republican candidate for Governor in 2006, announced his campaign for re-election on March 20, 2003, calling for the November election to "be a referendum on regionalism," "hope," and "opportunity."

Local Democrats struggled to attract a candidate, and eventually recruited Amherst Town Councilman Daniel Ward, who referred to the Giambra administration administration as "brain dead."

Giambra remained the frontrunner throughout the campaign, raising and spending significantly more than Ward. Ward ran an aggressive campaign against Giambra, accusing him of favoritism in county contracts and political patronage in hiring, which Gambia denied.

=== Polling ===
Poll source	Date(s) administered	Sample size (Note: Key: A – all adults RV – registered voters LV – likely voters CV – certain voters V – unclear)	Margin of error	Daniel J. Ward (D)	Joel Giambra (R)	Other / Undecided
Fingerhut Granados Opinion Research	September 16–18, 2003	450 (V)	± 5.0%	37%	42%	21%
Goldhaber Research Associates	October 5–7, 2003	504 (LV)	± 4.4%	25%	47%	23%
SurveyUSA	October 28–30, 2003	465 (CV)	± 4.7%	42%	53%	5%

=== Results ===
2003 Erie County Executive election
Party	Candidate	Votes	%
Republican	Joel Giambra	111,555	46.08%
Independence	Joel Giambra	13,128	5.42%
Conservative	Joel Giambra	9,622	3.97%
Total	Joel Giambra	134,305	55.47%
Democratic	Daniel J. Ward	98,371	40.64%
Working Families	Daniel J. Ward	9,402	3.88%
Total	Daniel J. Ward	107,773	44.53%
Total votes		242,078	100.00%
Republican hold			
