= Buffalo Niagara Medical Campus =

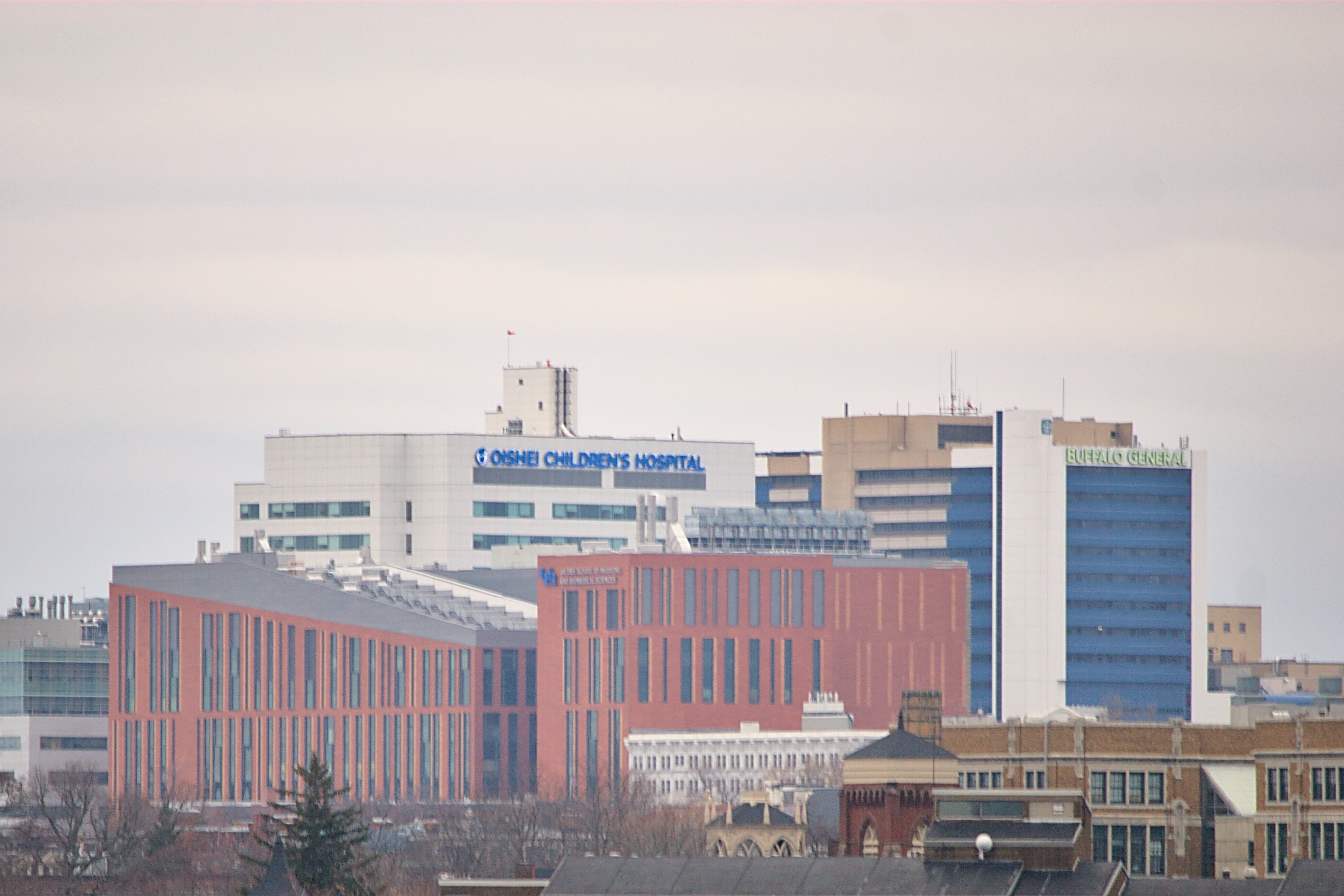
- Abbreviation: BNMC
- Formation: 2001
- Type: Non-profit
- Location: Buffalo, New York
- Coordinates: 42°53′45″N 78°52′10″W
- Key people: Matthew Enstice (President & CEO); Patrick J. Kilcullen (CFO)
- Staff: 17,000+
- Website: http://www.bnmc.org

The Buffalo Niagara Medical Campus (BNMC) is a medical center of health care, life sciences research and medical education institutions, co-located on 120 acres (49 ha) in Buffalo, New York. The BNMC was founded in 2001 by a consortium (including the University at Buffalo School of Medicine and Roswell Park Comprehensive Cancer Center). This project comprises one of the five "Strategic Investment Areas" that make up Buffalo, NY's Queen City Hub Plan, the city's strategic plan for urban redevelopment.

== History ==
The Buffalo Niagara Medical Campus, Inc. (BNMC, Inc.) is the umbrella organization created in 2001 by the institutions within the Medical Campus in Buffalo, New York. Since then, the campus has grown to over seven institutions, including Roswell Park Comprehensive Cancer Center, Buffalo General Hospital and the University at Buffalo School of Medicine. The not-for-profit organization was created to foster conversation and collaboration among member institutions, their employees, and the community. It also coordinates activities related to sustainable planning, development and enhancement of the 120-acre space.

The Medical Campus encompasses 6.5 million square feet of existing clinical, research, and support space today. There is more than two million square feet under construction totaling an investment of more than $750 million in private and public funding. Some 12,000 people work on the Medical Campus today, and that number is expected to rise to nearly 17,000 by 2017. On an annual basis, more than 1.5 million patients and visitors go through BNMC's doors.

In January 2016, The Buffalo News reported the Buffalo-Niagara region's unemployment in December 2015 was only 4.9 percent, the lowest level in nine years according to the New York State Department of Labor. The low unemployment was attributed to large building projects such as SolarCity and the Buffalo Niagara Medical Campus which fueled a hiring boom for construction workers with job growth running at an average pace of 1.6 percent which is more than double the rate of hiring during 2014 and nearly three times stronger than the employment gains during both 2012 and 2013.

As of the beginning of February 2016, minority and women-owned businesses have been awarded more than $55 million in contracts for work on the UB Medical School building under construction on the Buffalo Niagara Medical Campus.

=== Future ===
It is estimated that by 2017, combined with the initiatives of Roswell Park Comprehensive Cancer Center and UB 2020, employment on the Buffalo Niagara Medical Campus could exceed 17,000, close to that of the Bethlehem Steel plant in Lackawanna, NY before its closure.

With the completion of John R. Oishei Children's Hospital and the Jacobs School of Medicine, the next building planned for the campus is 33 High Street, an 11-story, 300,000 square foot building by Ciminelli Real Estate.

A pedestrian bridge linking the Conventus office building with the Jacobs School of Medicine is scheduled to open in 2018. This bridge will provide the Medical Campus with coatless access to the Allen/Medical Campus station of the Buffalo Metro Rail.

== Campus institutions ==
- Buffalo Hearing & Speech Center
- Buffalo Medical Group
- Center for Hospice and Palliative Care
- Hauptman-Woodward Medical Research Institute
- Kaleida Health
- Olmsted Center for Sight
- Ross Eye Institute
- Roswell Park Comprehensive Cancer Center
- University at Buffalo School of Medicine and Biomedical Sciences
- Upstate New York Transplant Services "Unyts"
- Fruit Belt Neighborhood (Medical Park)
- Allentown Neighborhood
- City of Buffalo
- County of Erie
- 43 North
- Innovation Center Buffalo
- z80 Labs

== Funders ==
- Buffalo Renaissance Foundation
- Community Foundation of Greater Buffalo
- FB Heron Foundation
- First Niagara
- Independent Health
- John R. Oishei Foundation
- National Grid
- New York State
- NYSERDA
- The Robert Wood Johnson Foundation
- U.S. Department of Transportation, Federal Transit Administration
- U.S. Small Business Administration
- Margaret L. Wendt Foundation

== Gallery ==
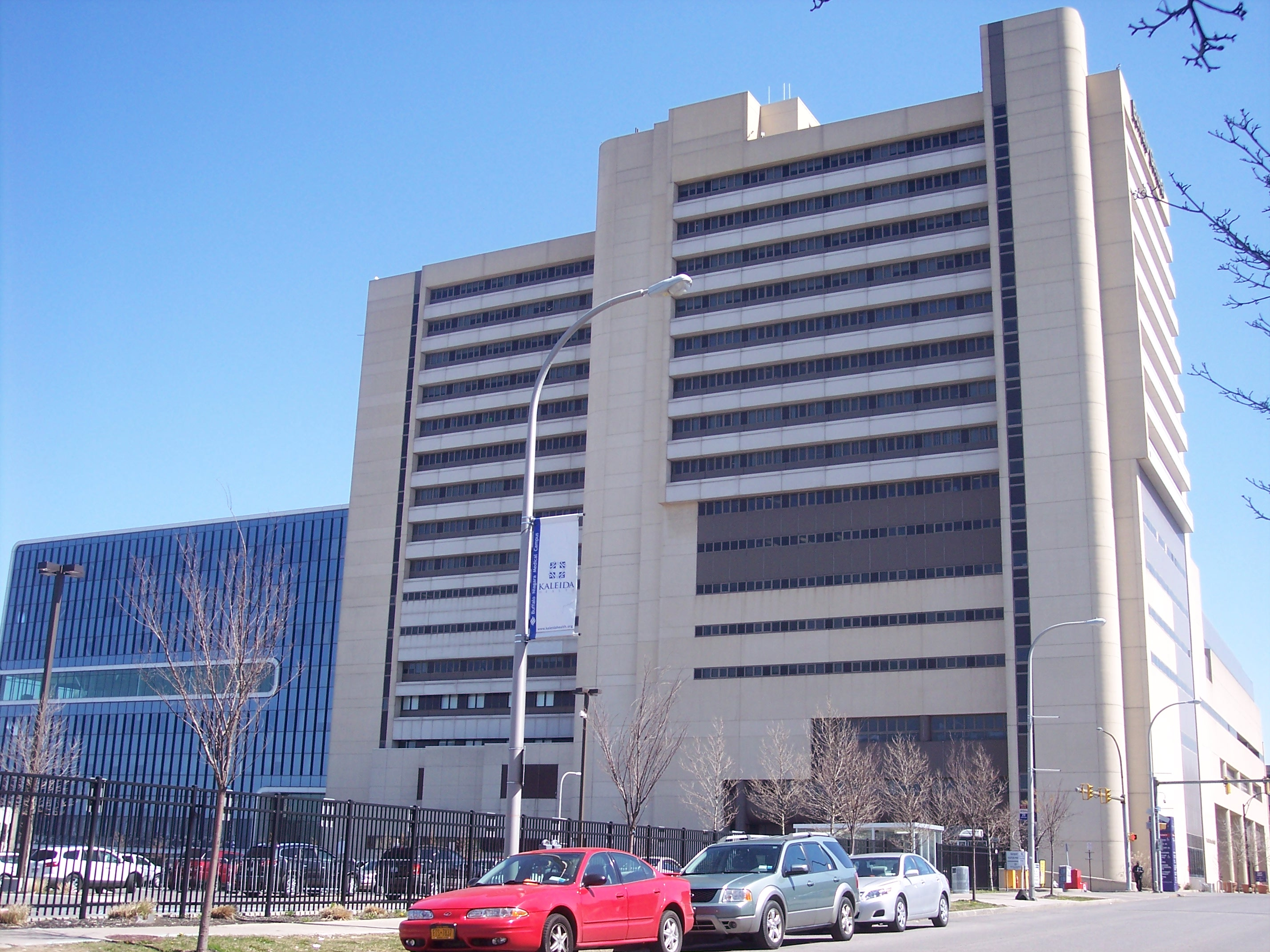
Buffalo General Medical Center

Golisano Children's Hospital of Buffalo

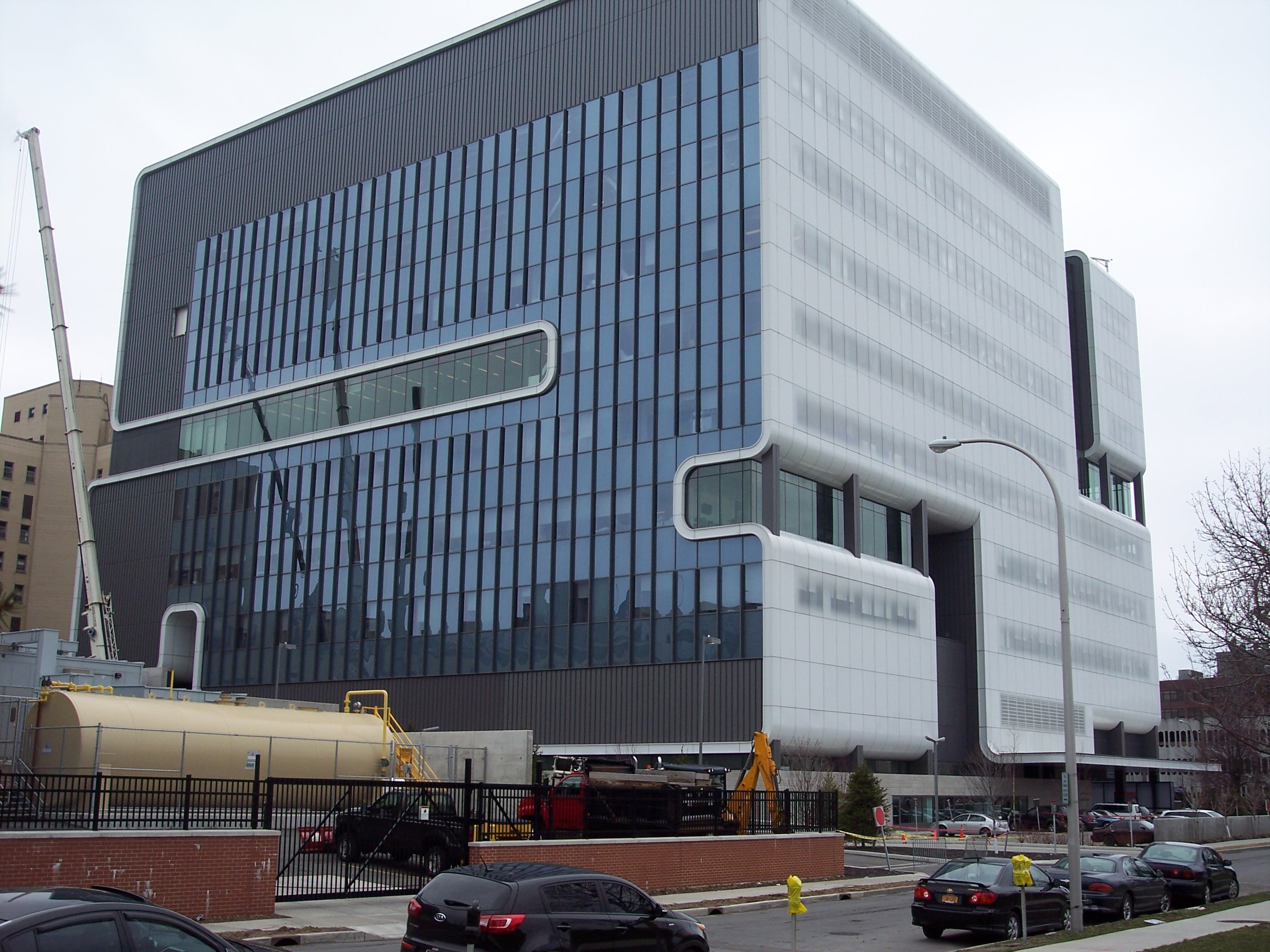
Gates Vascular Institute

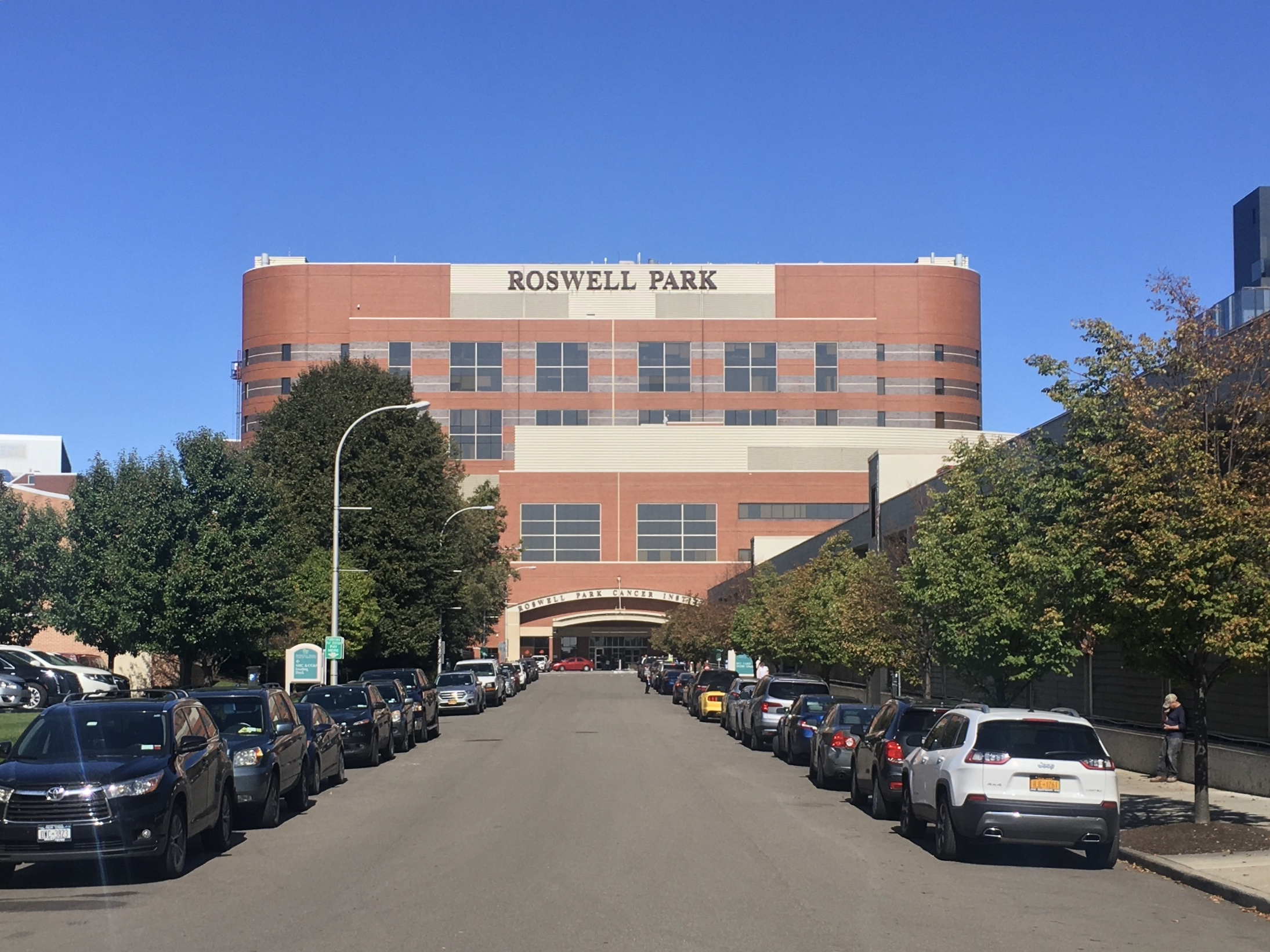
Roswell Park Comprehensive Cancer Center

== Awards and recognition ==
- 2013 - Chairman's Award for Innovation, National Grid – energizeBNMC Team
- 2012 - Outstanding Research/Science Park Award, Association of University Research Parks
- 2012 - Innovative Design Award, Global Workspace Association – Thomas R. Beecher Jr. Innovation Center
- 2012 - Outstanding Planning Award for Comprehensive Planning, Western New York Section of the American Planning Association – Four Neighborhoods, One Community
- 2012 - Americas Award, Alliance to Save Energy and the Southeast Energy Efficiency Alliance – BNMC Five-year Energy Innovation and Economic Development Plan
- 2012 - Meritorious Service Award, New York State Commercial Association of Realtors (NYSCAR) WNY Chapter – Buffalo Niagara Medical Campus team of Patrick J. Whalen and Matthew K. Enstice
- 2007 - Program of the Year Award, Northeastern Economic Developers Association – Buffalo Niagara Medical Campus Economic Development Achievements Amongst Northeastern States

== See also ==
- M. Wile and Company Factory Building: Now part of the BNMC campus
