= Independent Health =

American health insurance company

Independent Health Association, Inc. doing business as Independent Health, is a regional health insurance company headquartered in Williamsville, New York and serving Western New York; specifically, Allegany, Cattaraugus, Chautauqua, Erie, Genesee, Niagara, Orleans, and Wyoming Counties.

== Description ==
Independent Health is a 501(c)(4) nonprofit that reported a net income of $13.59 million on revenues of $1.57 billion in 2022. The company employees about 1,600 people. As of February 2024, Jim Dunlop Jr. is the president, and Michael Cropp is the CEO.

== History ==
Independent Health has collaborated since 2016 with Social Mobility, Inc. on the Reddy Bike program, providing bikeshare service to the City of Buffalo, the University at Buffalo, and Niagara Falls, New York.

== Legal Issues and Settlements ==
In 2021, the U.S. Attorney's office for the Western District of New York filed suit under the False Claims Act against Independent Health and its subsidiary DxID in federal court, alleging that the two had submitted, or caused to be submitted, unsupported diagnoses for inflated Medicare Advantage payments. On January 3, 2023, the United States District Court, Western District of New York issued an opinion dismissing the conspiracy claim, but allowing the U.S. Attorney to file an amended complaint.

In December 2024, Independent Health agreed to pay up to $98 million to settle allegations of possible fraud. The settlement was related to claims of improper practices that resulted in overcharging the government. Key points of the settlement include:

- The total settlement amount could reach up to $98 million depending on a number of factors.
- The allegations involved fraudulent activities that led to overcharging government programs.
- This case represents a significant financial and reputational impact on Independent Health.
