= 2015 Erie County, New York Executive election =

2015 Erie County Executive election
- November 8, 2015

Nominee	Mark Poloncarz	Raymond Walter
Party	Democratic	Republican
Alliance	Parties: Working Families; Women's Equality	Parties: Conservative; Independence; Reform
Popular vote	96,629	49,141
Percentage	65.63%	33.38%
County Executive before election
Mark Poloncarz
Democratic
Elected County Executive
Mark Poloncarz
Democratic

The 2015 Erie County, New York Executive election took place on November 3, 2015, to select the County Executive of Erie County, New York. Incumbent Democratic County Executive Mark Poloncarz, who remained popular following his response to the November winter storm, ran for re-election to a second term.

Poloncarz was challenged by State Assemblyman Raymond Walter, the Republican nominee, who argued that Poloncarz focused too much on economic development in Buffalo while "too many areas of the city and the county have been forgotten." Poloncarz declined to seek the nomination of the Conservative Party, saying, "It's not a party or a statewide platform that matches up with my beliefs," enabling Raymond to win the nomination unopposed.

Poloncarz entered the campaign as the frontrunner, significantly outraising Walter's campaign, and was seen as likely to win re-election. He ultimately won re-election in a landslide, receiving 66 percent of the vote to Walter's 33 percent, while Green Party candidate Eric Jones received 1 percent.

== Republican nomination ==
County Clerk Chris Jacobs emerged as the frontrunner for the Republican nomination, with State Senator Patrick Gallivan and County Controller Stefan I. Mychajliw Jr. both declining to run, with Mychajliw encouraging Jacobs to run. However, Jacobs ultimately decided not to run, and attention shifted to State Assemblyman Raymond Walter.

Walter announced that he would run, and won the Republican nomination unopposed.

== General election ==
=== Candidates ===
- Mark Poloncarz, incumbent County Executive (Democratic, Working Families, Women's Equality)
- Raymond Walter, State Assemblyman (Republican, Conservative, Independence, Reform)
- Eric Jones, party activist (Green)

=== Results ===
2015 Erie County Executive election
Party	Candidate	Votes	%
Democratic	Mark Poloncarz	88,157	59.87%
Working Families	Mark Poloncarz	6,488	4.41%
Women's Equality	Mark Poloncarz	1,984	1.35%
Total	Mark Poloncarz (inc.)	96,629	65.63%
Republican	Raymond Walter	33,393	22.68%
Conservative	Raymond Walter	12,968	8.81%
Independence	Raymond Walter	2,337	1.59%
Reform	Raymond Walter	443	0.30%
Total	Raymond Walter	49,141	33.38%
Green	Eric Jones	1,489	1.01%
Total votes		147,259	100.00%
Democratic hold			
