= Golisano Children's Hospital of Buffalo =

- Kaleida Health

- A photo of the facade in early August 2019 under the previous Oishei Children's Hospital name.

Geography
- Location: Buffalo, New York, United States
- Coordinates: 42.900623°N 78.867444°W

Organization
- Type: Specialist
- Affiliated university: Jacobs School of Medicine and Biomedical Sciences

Services
- Emergency department: Level I Pediatric Trauma Center
- Beds: 197
- Speciality: Children's hospital

Helipads
- Helipad: FAA LID: 1NY2
Number	Length		Surface
Number	ft	m	Surface
H1	45 x 45	14 × 14	rooftop

History
- Constructed: 2014; 12 years ago
- Founded: November 10, 2017; 9 years ago (replacing a hospital founded in 1892)

Links
- Website: www.ochbuffalo.org
- Lists: Hospitals in New York State

Golisano Children's Hospital of Buffalo, formerly known as John R. Oishei Children's Hospital, is a women's and children's hospital in Buffalo, New York, that opened on November 10, 2017. It provides pediatric specialties and subspecialties to infants, children, teens, and young adults up to age 21, and maternity services for expectant mothers. It is located at the Buffalo Niagara Medical Campus and has 185 inpatient beds. It is a pediatric facility serving patients in Western New York and parts of Southern Ontario. The hospital is one of the only freestanding children's hospitals in New York State. Golisano Children's Hospital is a teaching hospital affiliated with the State University of New York at Buffalo and is affiliated with the Kaleida Health System.

The hospital contains an ACS verified level 1 pediatric trauma center, one of the few in the region. Golisano Children's Hospital also has a rooftop helipad to transport critically ill patients to and from the hospital.

The hospital was originally named after the John R. Oishei Foundation, which donated $10 million for the development of the hospital.

In January 2026, the hospital was renamed Golisano Children's Hospital of Buffalo.

== History ==
Pediatrics in Buffalo dates back to 1892 when the original Children's Hospital of Buffalo (later renamed to Women and Children's Hospital of Buffalo) opened on Bryant Street.

The push for a new children's hospital in Buffalo dates back to 1999 when plans for a new children's hospital to replace the old Women and Children's Hospital of Buffalo were created due to aging facilities and a lack of modern amenities. The plans from Kaleida Health included moving the children's hospital to the downtown Buffalo Niagara Medical Campus to better consolidate their facilities. Residents of Buffalo did not support the planned move and launched a campaign against the movement and Kaleida Health called "save our children's hospital," which included many celebrities from Buffalo including Jim Kelly and Pat LaFontaine.

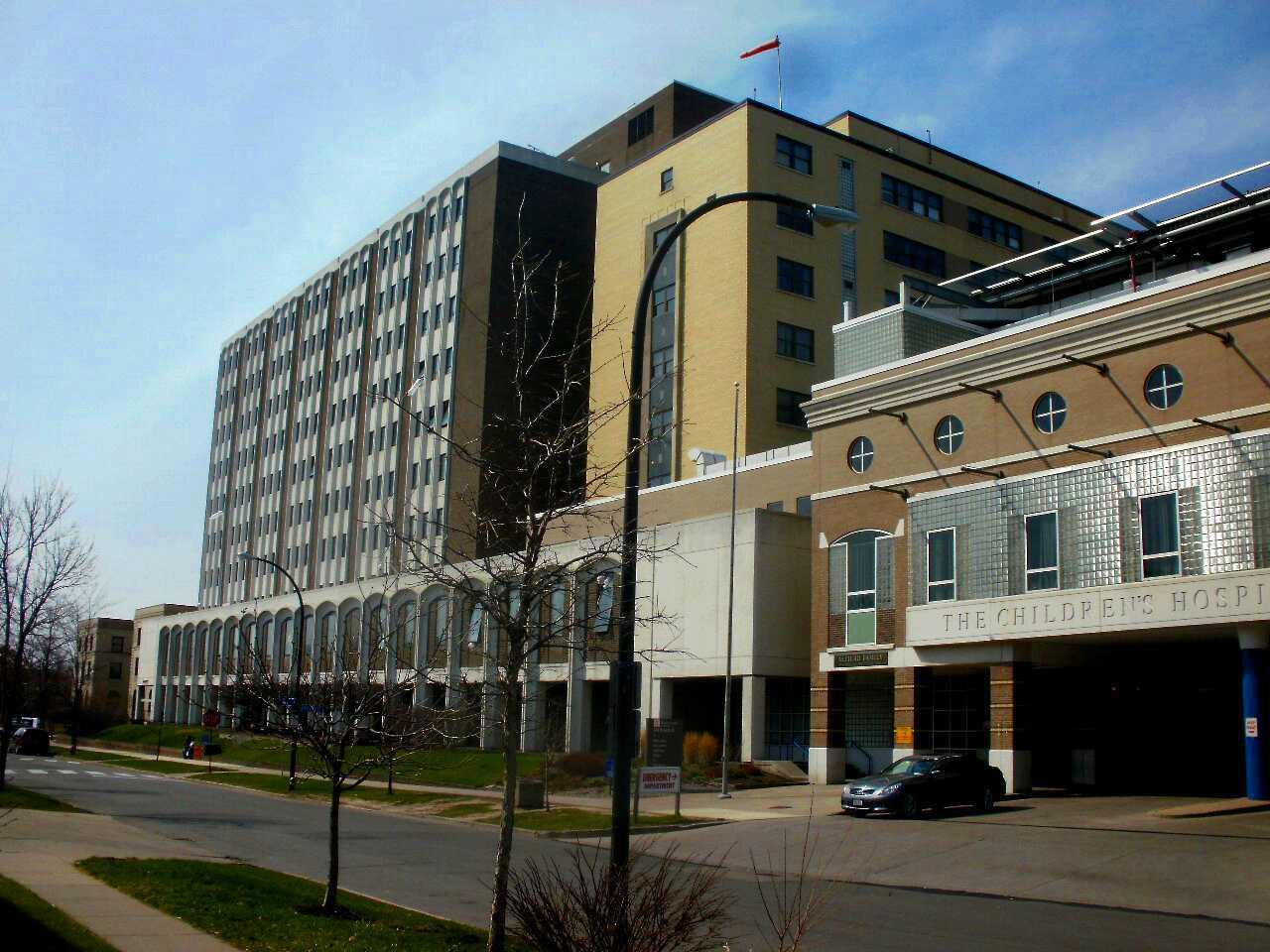
The Women's and Children's Hospital of Buffalo, which was closed in 2017

In 2007 new proposals from Kaleida Health to renovate the hospital at the existing site angered many residents who were concerned that renovations of the hospital would ruin the character of the neighborhood. Kaleida then returned to the original proposal to move the hospital downtown. This renewed proposal met with much less resistance from the general public than their previous attempts.

Construction on the hospital started in 2014 at an estimated cost of $350 million, $35 million of which was provided by the state of New York and $10 million from the John R. Oishei Foundation. The hospital was built by Turner Construction and designed by the acclaimed architectural firm, Shepley Bulfinch. The design included 12 floors and 400,000 square feet of space.

On November 10, 2017, 125 patients were moved from the old Women & Children's Hospital of Buffalo to the new hospital by a team of doctors, nurses, and volunteers. American Medical Response provided the transport services including specialized Critical Care Transport for patients in the multiple Intensive Care Units at the old hospital.

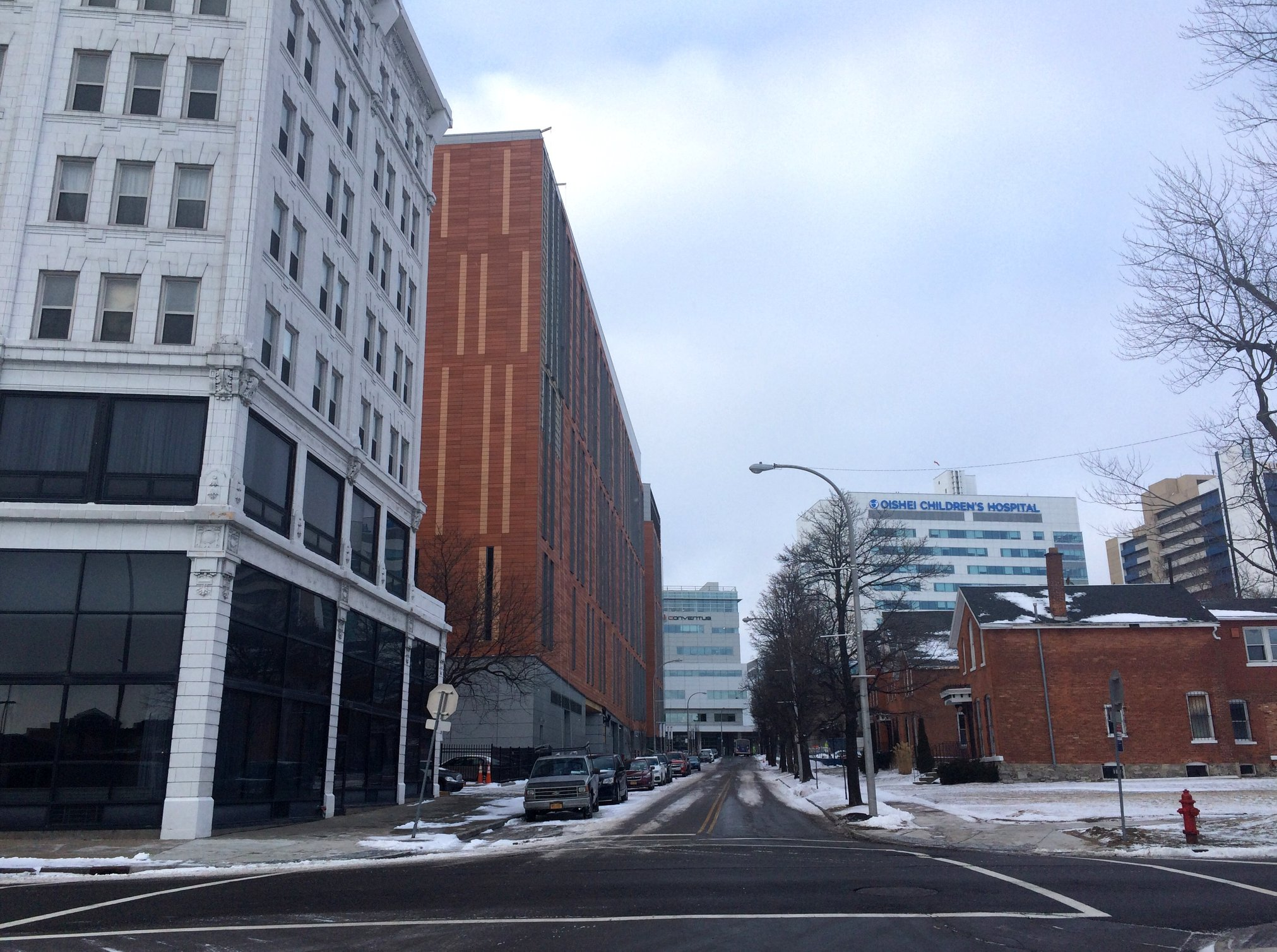
(left to right) in the distance are the Conventus building, Golisano Children's Hospital (formerly known as Oishei Children's Hospital), and Buffalo General Hospital Building A.

In 2020, following the advice of the CDC, the hospital limited the amount of visitors, in response to the COVID-19 pandemic. The hospital limited visitors to only 2 parents or guardians for children, and one significant other for pregnant women. Also in the wake of the 2020 COVID-19 pandemic, the hospital added ICU beds and placed NICU patients in the same room as their mother. The hospital also created a plan to host adult patients in the case of a patient surge. Buffalo Bills quarterback Josh Allen has done charity work with Golisano Children's Hospital. On November 8, 2020, Allen led the Bills to a 44–34 upset win over the Seattle Seahawks. After the game, it was revealed that Allen's grandmother, Patricia Allen, had died the night before the game. In response, fans of the Buffalo Bills (colloquially known as 'Bills Mafia') began to donate to the hospital in $17 increments (17 being Allen's jersey number). As of November 17, 2020, the total amount donated had exceeded $300,000. On November 21, 2020, the hospital announced that they would be naming a new wing on the 10th floor as the "Patricia Allen Pediatric Recovery Wing" to honor the donations received by the Bills fans.

In November, 2020 the hospital announced that they had expanded their age limit from 21 to 25 to better handle COVID-19 surge capacity.

In January 2026, the hospital was renamed Golisano Children's Hospital of Buffalo. This was due to a $50 million donation that was made by B. Thomas Golisano in August 2025. This is the fourth children's hospital to be named after Golisano, following facilities in Rochester and Syracuse in New York and Fort Myers, Florida. Since that time, six additional children's hospitals have received a total of $253 million in donations from Golisano and all are being renamed in recognition. The ten hospitals will collaborate together to advance pediatric care.

== Features ==
The hospital contains an ACS verified level 1 pediatric trauma center, one of the few in the region, and a rooftop helipad to transport critically ill patients to and from the hospital.

The hospital has an American Academy of Pediatrics level IV neonatal intensive care unit with a capacity of 64 beds for critically ill newborn babies. Overall, the facility has 185 inpatient beds.

The new construction includes amenities commonly seen in modern children's hospitals, including an open airy lobby, colorful spaces, playrooms, and places for parents and children to relax.

== Awards ==
During its first two years of operation, Oishei Children's Hospital was named as a top children's hospital by The Leapfrog Group, an independent organization dedicated to providing transparency and safety in hospital environments.

== Controversy ==
In 2019 it was revealed that a hospital physician, Kathryn Bass, made gross surgical mistakes on several patients and did not report them to state or hospital officials. Bass reached a settlement with the state medical board and pleaded no contest and was put on probation.

== See also ==
- List of children's hospitals in the United States
- Kaleida Health
- SUNY Buffalo
- Buffalo General Hospital
