= Roswell Park Comprehensive Cancer Center =

- National Comprehensive Cancer Network

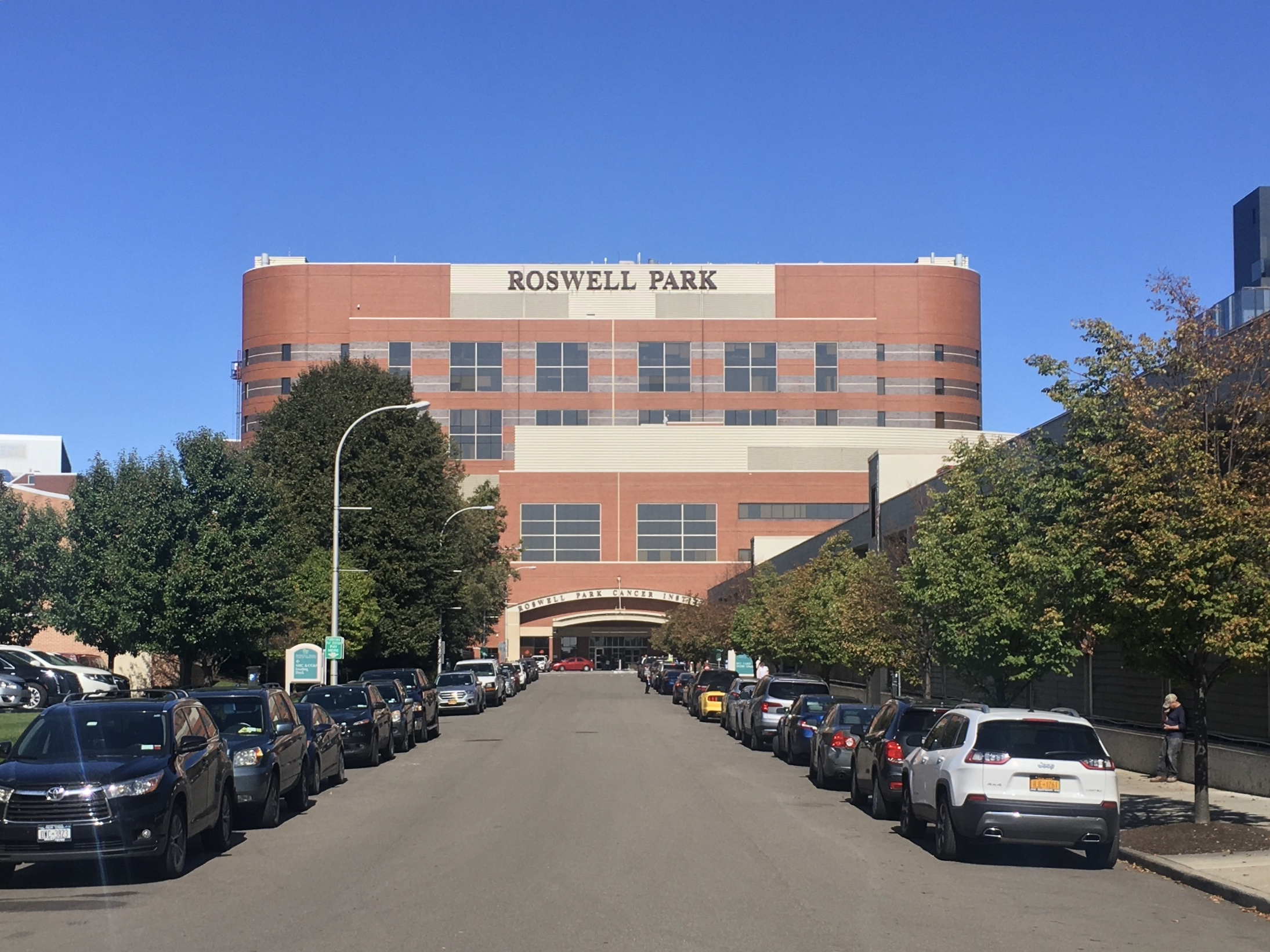

Geography
- Location: Buffalo, New York, United States
- Coordinates: 42.897185°N 78.866852°W

Organization
- Care system: Medicare
- Type: Specialist
- Affiliated university: University at Buffalo, the State University of New York

Services
- Standards: NCI-designated Cancer Center
- Beds: 133 (licensed)
- Speciality: Oncology, Teaching hospital

History
- Former names: The Pathological Laboratory of the University of Buffalo (1898 - 1899); The Gratwick Research Laboratory (1900 - 1911); New York State Institute for the Study of Malignant Disease (1912-1945); Roswell Park Memorial Institute (1946 - 1991); Roswell Park Cancer Institute (1992 - 2017)
- Founded: 1898; 128 years ago

Links
- Website: www.roswellpark.org
- Lists: Hospitals in New York State
- Other links: List of NYS Public Benefit Corporations

Roswell Park Comprehensive Cancer Center is a cancer research and treatment center located in Buffalo, New York. Founded by surgeon Roswell Park in 1898, the center was the first in the United States to specifically focus on cancer research. The center is usually called Roswell Park in short. The center, which conducts clinical research on cancer as well as the development new drugs, provides advanced treatment for all forms of adult and pediatric cancer, and serves as a member of the National Comprehensive Cancer Network. Until 2025, Roswell Park Comprehensive Cancer Center was the only Western New York facility to hold the National Cancer Institute designation of "comprehensive cancer center".

The Roswell Park campus, spread out in 15 separate buildings of approximately two million square feet, occupies 28 acres (11 ha) on the 100-acre (40 ha) Buffalo Niagara Medical Campus in downtown Buffalo, and includes 1,500,000 square feet (140,000 m^{2}) of space equally distributed between clinical programs and research/education functions. A separate hospital building, completed in 1998, houses a diagnostic and treatment center. The campus also includes a medical research complex as well as research and education focused spaces.

== History ==
In 1898, the program that would later become the cancer center was established by Roswell Park, who was a professor of surgery at the University of Buffalo School of Medicine. Park said that "Only through a deliberate well-planned, combined attack from various directions by means fitted for such work could real advances be made and further the relationship of laboratory work, clinical study and education must be closely associated."

Research started in three rooms in the University of Buffalo School of Medicine but not long thereafter, it outgrew the rooms. Seeing the importance of dedicated cancer research, select Buffalo citizens donated funds to purchase land and construct a new building. The largest contributor was Mrs. William Gratwick (wife of William H. Gratwick, the founder of Gratwick, Smith & Fryer Lumber Co.), who donated $25,000. The Gratwick Research Laboratory of the University of Buffalo was constructed in 1901 and was located at High and Elm streets.

Park wrote books, gave lectures, and was the administrator at the cancer research center. In 1904, Park stepped down and Harvey R. Gaylord took over as the center's second director. Park remained as the chairman of the board of trustees.

In coming decades the center was renamed the Roswell Park Cancer Institute, a name it retained for decades until 2018, when its current name was implemented. The Roswell Park Cancer Institute was usually called Roswell Park or RPCI for short.

=== Notable facts ===
- Founded in 1898 as the world's first institute devoted exclusively to cancer research 1884 – On May 31, Memorial Sloan Kettering Cancer Center is founded as New York Cancer Hospital at 106th Street and Central Park West in Manhattan. New York Cancer Hospital is the first institution in the United States devoted exclusively to the treatment and research of cancer.
- Gerty Cori was the first woman to receive the Nobel Prize in Physiology or Medicine.
- The center's first female leader, Candace S. Johnson was named President & CEO in February 2015.
- Leads New York State in the number of robotic cystectomies performed
- Established one of the nation's first long-term survivors clinics for childhood cancer patients

== Discoveries and advancements in cancer care ==
=== Discovery of how the human body converts glucose to glycogen ===
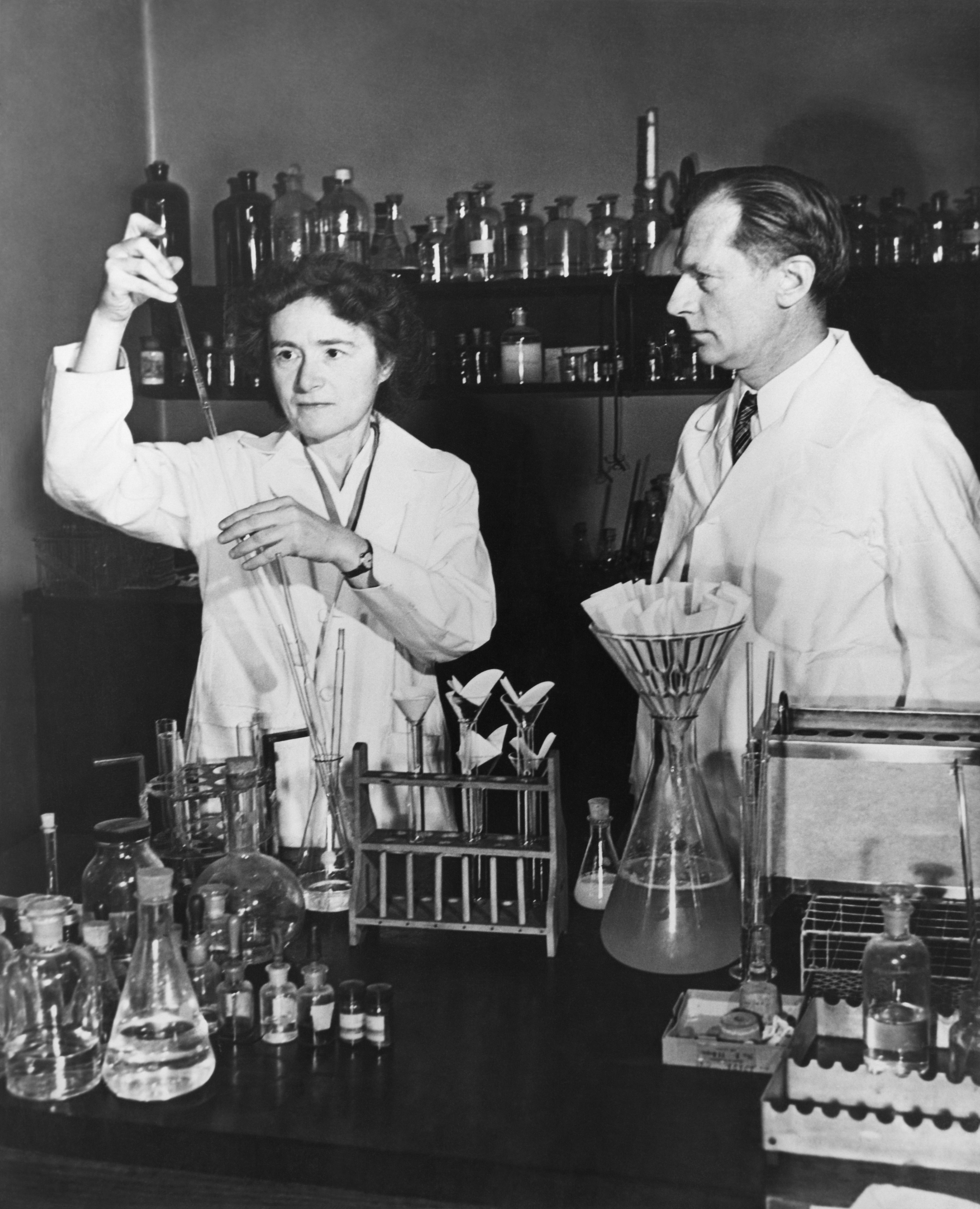
Gerty Cori and Carl Cori jointly won the 1947 Nobel Prize in Physiology or Medicine for their discovery of the way in which the body converts glucose to glycogen.

Drs. Gerty and Carl Cori jointly won the 1947 Nobel Prize in Physiology or Medicine, "for their discovery of the course of the catalytic conversion of glycogen." Their research leading to the discovery began during their tenure at Roswell Park (then called the New York State Institute for the Study of Malignant Diseases), from 1922 to 1931.

=== Alternative breast cancer treatments ===
Thomas Dao (1921–2009), served as director of the breast surgery department from 1957 to 1988, where he developed breast cancer treatment alternatives.

=== Development of photodynamic therapy ===
In 1975, Thomas Dougherty successfully treated preclinical models of cancer using photodynamic therapy (PDT) techniques for the first time. In 1978, he conducted the first PDT clinical trial. Today, PDT is an FDA-approved method for treating specific kinds of cancer, and is used around the world.

=== Discovery of PSA ===
Research resulting in the discovery of the prostate-specific antigen (PSA) was led by T. Ming Chu in the 1970s. His team subsequently developed a way to detect the PSA protein in blood as a simple diagnostic test. Since its FDA approvals in 1986 and 1994, an estimated one billion PSA tests have been given.

=== Research on 5-fluorouracil + leucovorin ===
Biochemist Marie Hakala, PhD first observed that 5-fluorouracil becomes more effective in treating cancer cells when calcium leucovorin is added. This discovery paved the way for the development of 5-FU + leucovorin therapy, which was for many years the gold standard of chemotherapy for colorectal cancer.

=== Research on SurVaxM ===
SurVaxM, a cancer immunotherapy vaccine, was awarded orphan drug status by the United States Food and Drug Administration in 2017. A phase II clinical trial of SurVaxM has shown that the vaccine, when combined with standard therapy, is more effective than standard therapies alone.

== Organization ==
=== Education ===
Roswell Park offers both Master's and PhD programs in Cancer Sciences. These programs are offered in collaboration with the University at Buffalo Jacobs School of Medicine.

=== Reputation ===
Roswell Park Comprehensive Cancer Center has received numerous accolades for the quality of healthcare provided.

- In 2020, Roswell Park ranked #14 on U.S. News & World Report's list of the best cancer hospitals in the country, and was ranked High Performing in the areas of colon cancer surgery and lung cancer surgery.
- Roswell Park has received recognition from Blue Cross Blue Shield as a Blue Distinction Center for Cancer Care, Blood and Marrow Transplants, and Cellular Immunotherapy.
- Roswell Park is recognized as an Age-Friendly Health System by the Institute for Healthcare Improvement.
- The American College of Radiology has recognized Roswell Park as a Breast Cancer Center of Excellence.
- Roswell Park is recognized as an Optum Cancer Center of Excellence.
- The Lung Cancer Alliance has recognized Roswell Park as a Screening Center of Excellence.
- Roswell Park is certified as a Quality Oncology Practice Initiative by the American Society of Clinical Oncology.

=== Accreditation ===
- Accreditation Council for Continuing Medical Education
- Accreditation Council for Graduate Medical Education
- American Dental Association - Dentistry and Maxillofacial Prosthetics
- Association for the Accreditation of Human Research Protection Programs
- Association for Assessment and Accreditation of Laboratory Animal Care International (AAALAC International)
- Association of American Blood Banks
- Cancer Immunotherapy Trials Network Member (CITN)
- Commission on Cancer Accredited Program - American College of Surgeons
- Foundation for the Accreditation of Cellular Therapy (FACT)
- Gold Seal of Approval - Joint Commission on Accreditation of Healthcare Organizations
- Palliative Care Certification - Joint Commission on Accreditation of Healthcare Organizations
- Laboratory Accreditation - Joint Commission on Accreditation of Healthcare Organizations
- National Cancer Institute-designated Comprehensive Cancer Center
- National Comprehensive Cancer Network Member Institution
- National Marrow Donor Program
- Society of Surgical Oncology - Surgical Oncology Training Program
- National Accreditation Program for Breast Cancers

== Patient care ==
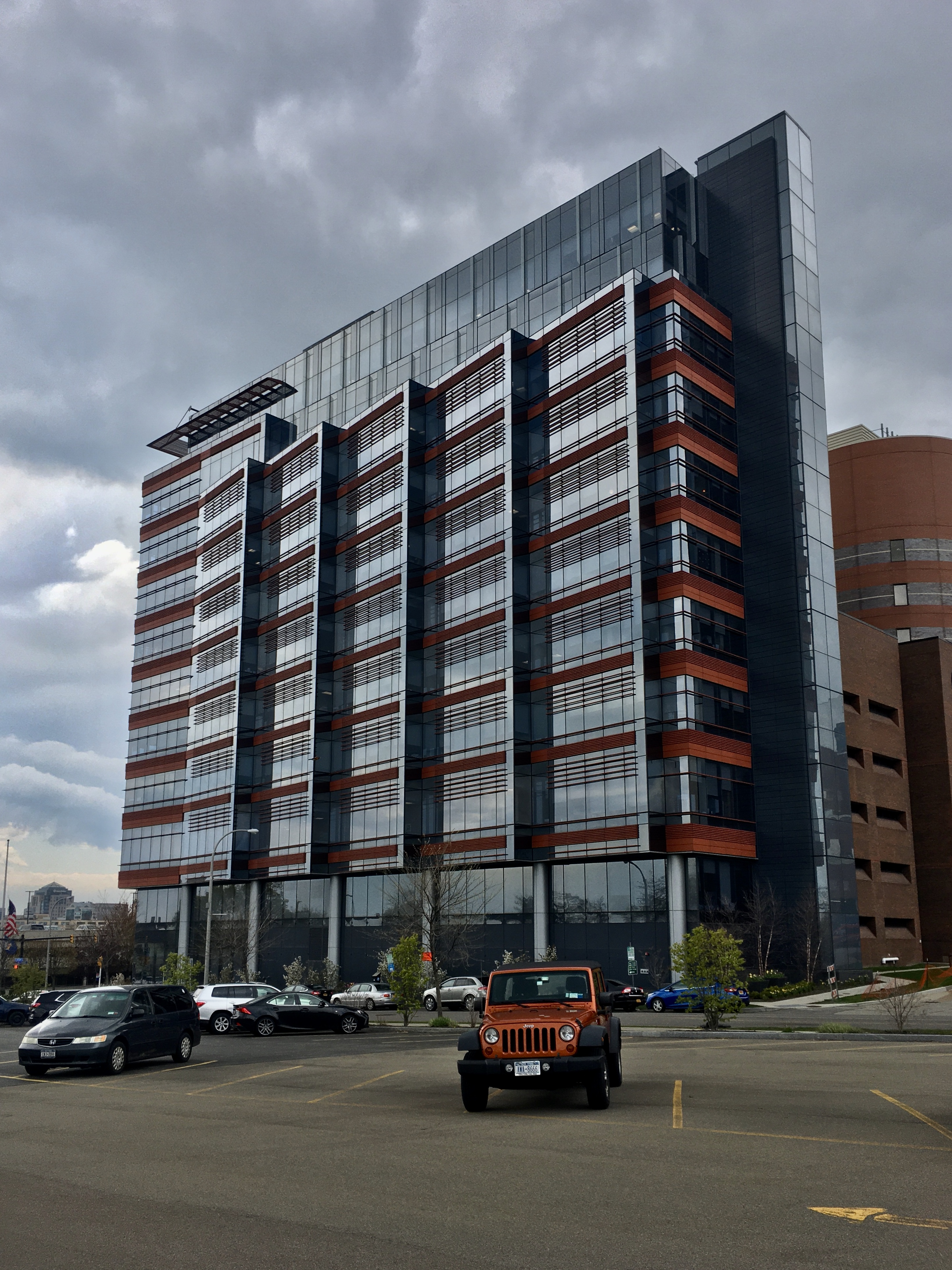
Scott Bieler Clinical Sciences Center

Roswell Park provides comprehensive care for a wide range of cancers.

- Adrenal Cancer
- Anal Cancer
- Bladder Cancer
- Brain Cancer
- Breast Cancer
- Cervical Cancer
- Chronic Lymphocytic Leukemia (CLL)
- Colon & Rectal Cancer
- Esophageal Cancer
- Fallopian Tube Cancer
- Gallbladder & Bile Duct Cancers
- Head & Neck Cancer
- Kidney Cancer
- Leukemia & Other Blood Disorders
- Liver Cancer
- Lung Cancer
- Lymphoma
- Mediastinal Tumors
- Melanoma
- Mesothelioma
- Multiple Myeloma
- Myelodysplastic Syndromes
- Neuroendocrine Tumors
- Ovarian Cancer
- Pancreatic Cancer
- Pediatric Cancer & Blood Disorders
- Penile Cancer
- Prostate Cancer
- Sarcoma & Other Soft Tissue Tumors
- Skin Cancers other than Melanoma
- Spinal Tumors
- Stomach Cancer
- Testicular Cancer
- Thymus Cancer
- Thyroid & Parathyroid Cancer
- Undiagnosed Cancers
- Urethral Cancer
- Uterine & Endometrial Cancer
- Vaginal Cancer
- Vulvar Cancer

=== Specialized treatments ===
Roswell Park offers specialized treatments, services and therapies to treat cancer, as well as services to support patients undergoing cancer treatment.

- Advanced Endoscopy
- Anesthesiology & Critical Care Medicine
- Balloon Kyphoplasty
- Blood Bank/Plateletpheresis
- BMT & Cellular Therapy
- 3-D Brain Mapping
- Cancer Pain Management Service
- Dentistry and Maxillofacial Prosthetics
- Experimental Therapeutics
- Follow-up Clinic for Long-term Survivors of Childhood Cancer
- Genetic Screening, Counseling, and DNA Banking
- Clinical Trials
- Community Cancer Resource Center
- Diagnostic Radiology
- Gamma Knife
- High-Risk Breast Cancer Program
- High-Risk Lung Cancer Program
- High-Risk Ovarian Cancer Program
- High-Risk Pancreas Cancer Program
- Minimally Invasive Surgical Suite
- Immunotherapy
- Integrative Medicine
- Interventional Pulmonology
- Interventional Radiology
- Mohs Surgery
- Nuclear Medicine
- Nursing
- Pathology & Laboratory Medicine
- Patient Advocates & Social Workers
- Personalized Medicine
- Photodynamic Therapy
- Psychosocial Support
- Radiation Oncology
- Rehabilitation Services including physical, occupational and speech therapy
- Robotic Surgery
- Tobacco Cessation Resources
- Women's and Men's Sexual Health Clinics for Cancer Survivors

== Collaborations ==
=== CIMAvax ===
Roswell Park was the first American institution to receive FDA permission to conduct clinical trials of CIMAvax, a Cuban medical therapy developed by Centro de Immunologica Molecular, La Habana, Cuba.

=== Ovarian Cancer SPORE ===
The Ovarian Cancer SPORE is a collaboration between Roswell Park and University of Pittsburgh Cancer Institute (UPCI). The SPORE project includes multiple research projects, core supportive structures, and career development programs.

=== Cancer Registries ===
==== Stacey Scott Lung Cancer Registry ====
Together with the British Columbia Cancer Agency, Vancouver, Canada and Vrije Universiteit, Amsterdam, the Netherlands, Roswell Park manages the Stacey Scott Lung Cancer Registry.

==== Familial Ovarian Cancer Registry ====
Founded in 1990 by Steven Piver, the Familial Ovarian Cancer Registry houses information relating to family history and lifestyle of patients and families with histories of ovarian cancer.

=== Research and training collaborations ===
Roswell Park collaborates with institutions around the world to strengthen cancer training and research programs.

- Centro de Immunologia Molecular (CIM), Playa, La Habana, Cuba
- Debrecen Medical University, Debrecen, Hungary
- Children’s Cancer Institute in Australia, Sydney, Australia
- Institute of Materia Medica of Nanyang Normal University, China
- Jagiellonian University (JU), Kraków, Poland
- King Fahad Specialist Hospital, Dammam, Saudi Arabia
- Lakeshore Cancer Center (LCC), Lagos, Nigeria
- Maccabi Healthcare Services and University of Haifa, Israel
- National Research Center for Hematology, Moscow, Russia
- Pecs Medical University, Pecs, Hungary
- Queen Mary University of London, United Kingdom
- Semmelweis University, Budapest, Hungary
- University of Szeged Medical School, Szeged, Hungary
- University of Waterloo, Canada

== See also ==
- Erie County Medical Center
- Nassau University Medical Center
- Westchester Medical Center University Hospital
