= Kaleida Health =

Non-profit healthcare network in Buffalo, New York, US

Coordinates: 42.9008896°N 78.8679687°W

- Industry: Health care
- Predecessor: CFG Health System
- Founded: Buffalo, New York, United States; 1998; 28 years ago
- Headquarters: Buffalo, New York, United States
- Area served: Western New York
- Key people: Jody L. Lomeo
- Services: Hospital network
- Number of employees: 9,675
- Divisions: See prose
- Website: kaleidahealth.org

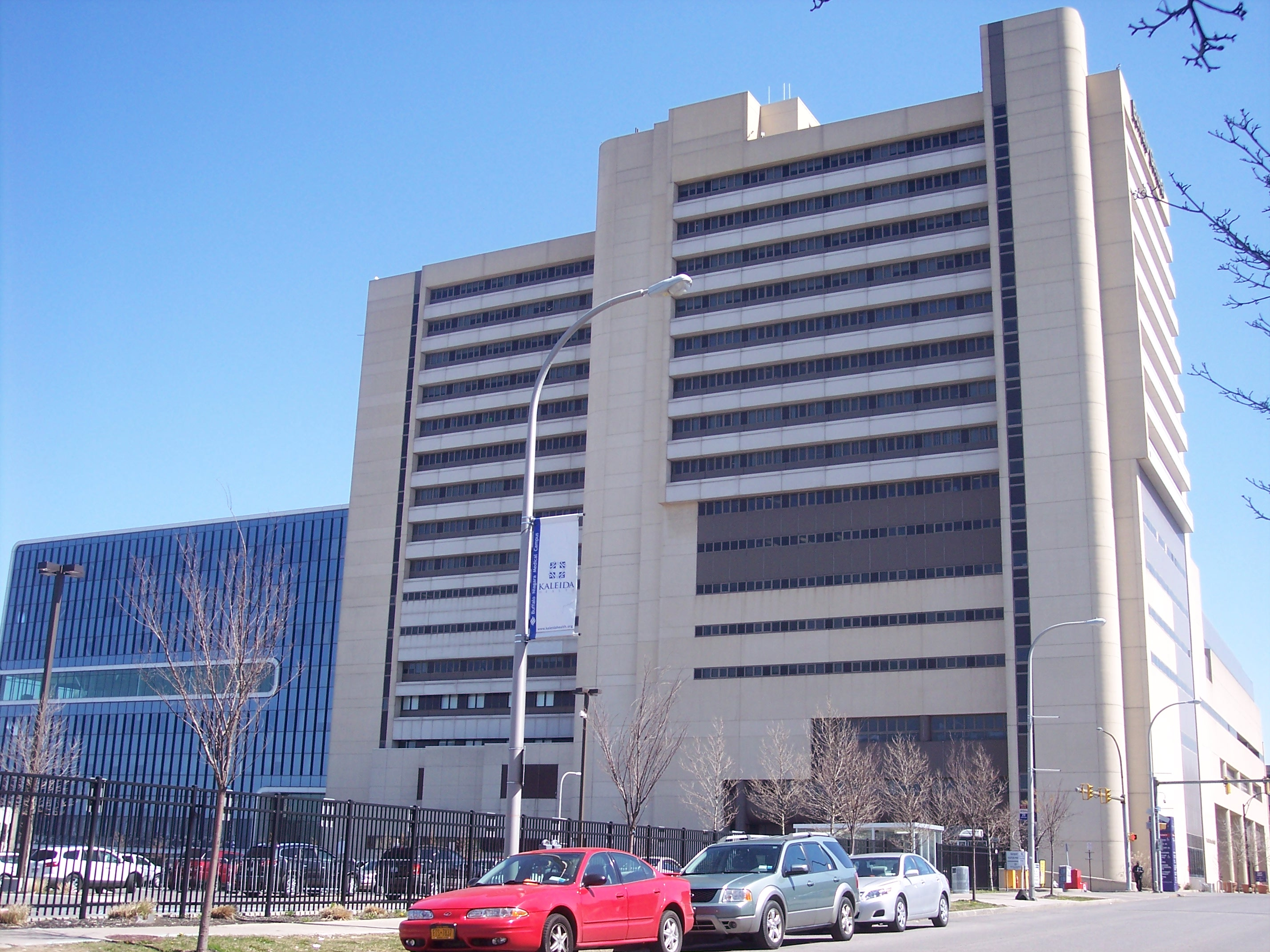
Buffalo General Medical Center (viewed from High Street in 2012)

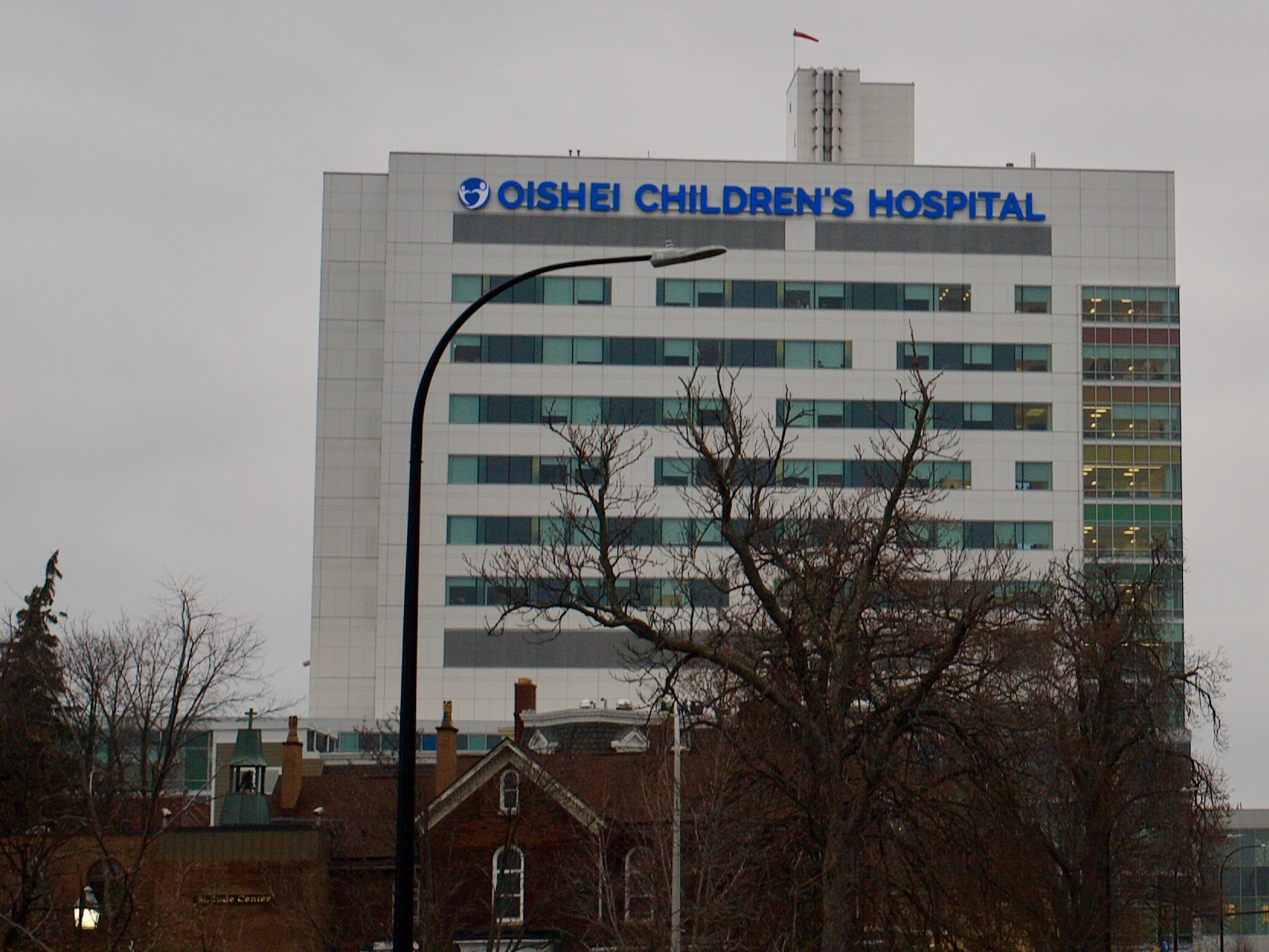
Golisano Children's Hospital of Buffalo (viewed from Ellicott Street in 2017)

Kaleida Health, founded in 1998, is a not-for-profit healthcare network that manages five hospitals in the Buffalo–Niagara Falls metropolitan area. Prior to the merger of member hospitals into the network, it was known as the Millard Fillmore Health System.

== Facilities ==
Kaleida Health runs the Buffalo General Medical Center, a hospital on the premises of the Buffalo Niagara Medical Campus. It was founded on its current site in the mid-19th century and has undergone multiple expansions, including one in 1986, that added a 16-story tower to the main complex. The hospital had 24,000 inpatient visits in 2016. The interior lobby was remodeled and the exterior of the building was repainted in 2018, to match the color scheme of newer facilities on the campus, at a cost of $2 million.

Kaleida also runs the Golisano Children's Hospital of Buffalo, a children's hospital that opened in November 2017. It cost $270 million and took nearly three years to build. It replaced Women and Children's Hospital of Buffalo. There are 185 beds, including 64 neonatal units, 14 operating rooms, an indoor garden, and skyway connections to both Buffalo General Medical Center and Conventus. The hospital broke ground in early 2015 and was designed by Shepley Bulfinch and built by Turner Construction.

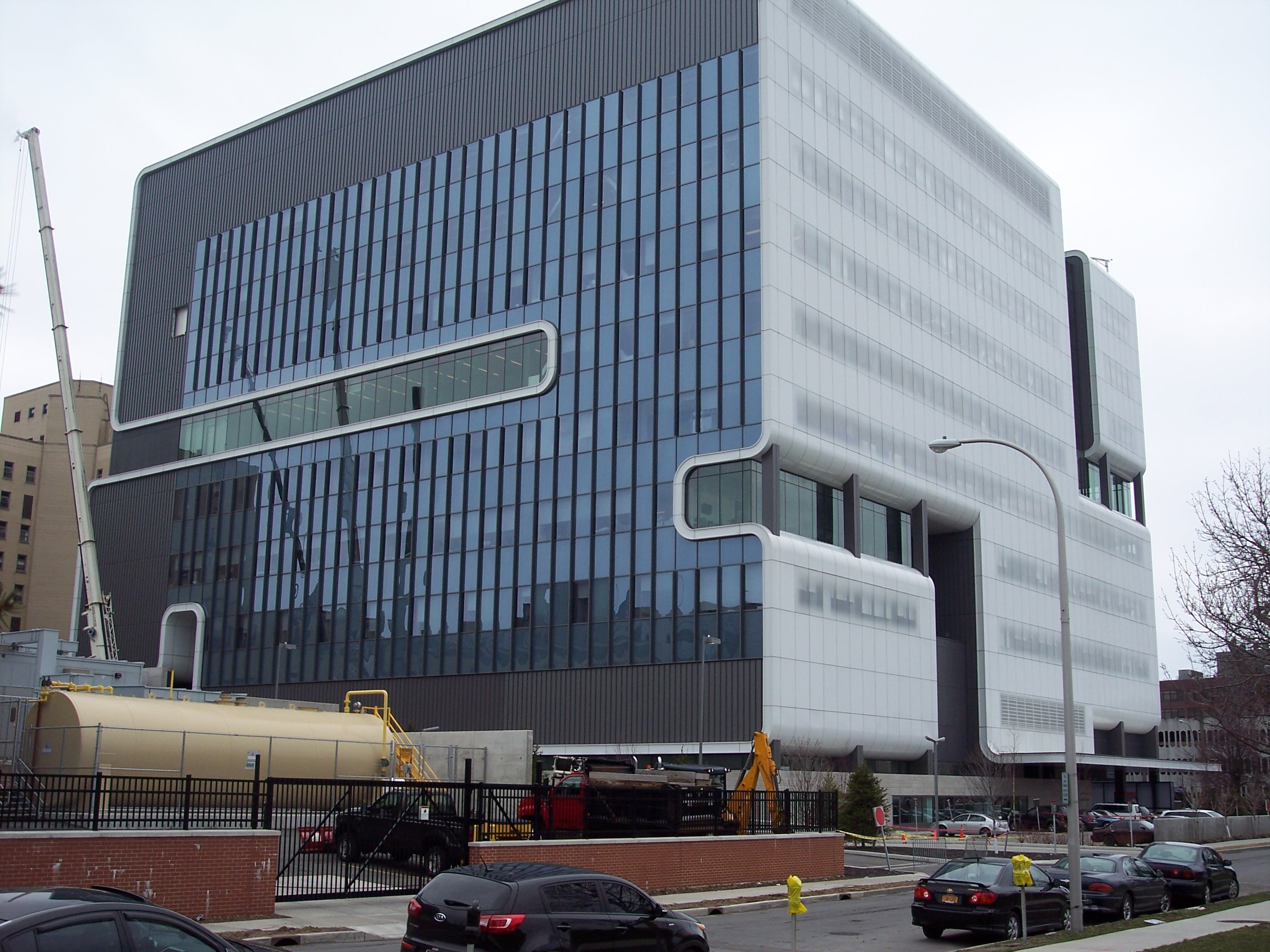
Gates Vascular Institute (viewed from East North Street)

In 2012, Kaleida and the State University of New York at Buffalo jointly built the Gates Vascular Institute building. It replaced Millard Fillmore Gates Circle Hospital, which was demolished in October 2015. The lower floors house a clinical facility run by Kaleida that includes an emergency room, outpatient, inpatient and medical imaging facilities. As of 2017, Kaleida Health oversees Upper Allegheny Health System, which comprises Brooks Memorial Hospital, Olean General, and Cuba Memorial Hospital.

== Patient safety concerns ==
In July 2015, Consumer Reports produced a report on the prevalence of hospital-acquired infections and gave Kaleida hospitals a below average ranking in all but one category. The ranking was based on hospital-reported data provided to federal Centers for Disease Control and Prevention between October 2013 and September 2014. Kaleida Health was also cited by Medicare for having high rates of infections and other patient-safety problems. The Hospital Acquired Conditions Reduction Program, which was created as part of the Affordable Care Act, seeks to incentivize hospitals to improve patient safety by measuring rates of hospital-acquired infection and other patient safety metrics, and then penalizing hospitals that perform poorly. As a result of this program, Kaleida Health was penalized more than $1 million in 2016 through reduced Medicare payments.
