= Economy of Buffalo, New York =

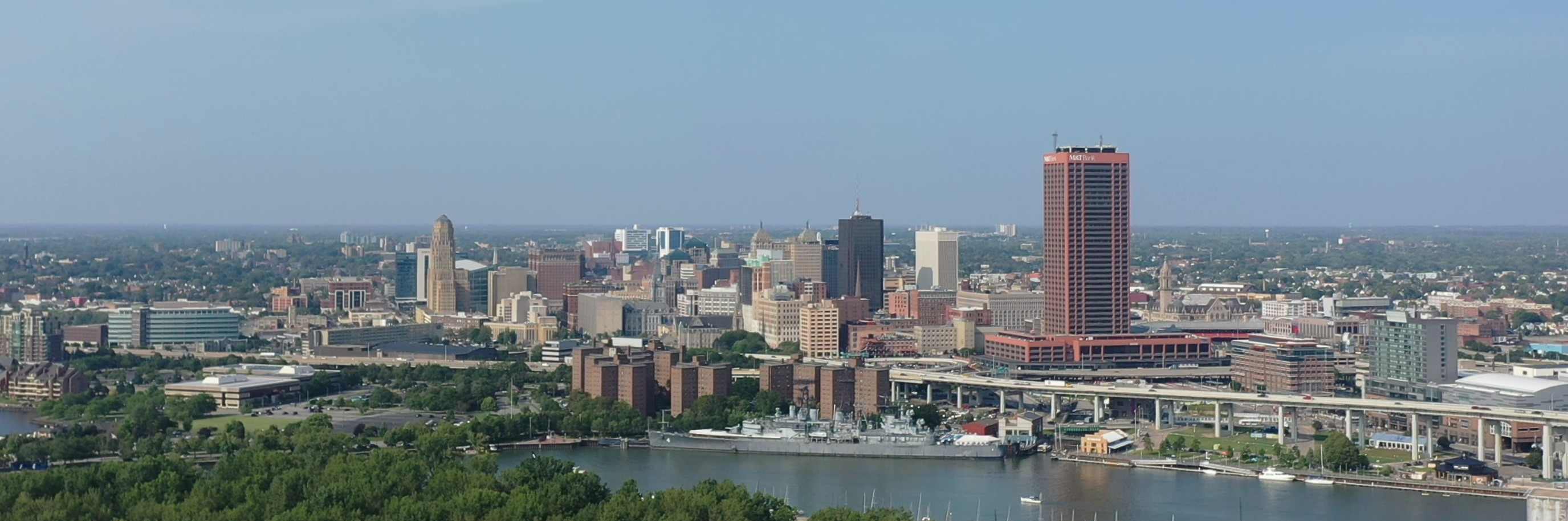
Downtown Skyline of Buffalo

"Elevator Alley", the stretch of the Buffalo River immediately adjacent to the harbor that is lined with historic grain elevators

The economy of Buffalo, New York mostly consists of industrial, light manufacturing, high-tech, and service-oriented private sector companies. The region’s economy has diversified across multiple industries.

== History ==
Since the early 1820s, especially following the construction of the Erie Canal from 1817-1825, Buffalo and the surrounding region were involved in railroad commerce, steel manufacturing, automobile production, aircraft design and production, Great Lakes shipping, and grain storage. Over the years, many of these industries left the city. Major steel production has ceased in the area, although several smaller steel mills remain in operation. As of the 1950 United States census, Buffalo was the 15th largest city in the country, the nation's largest inland port (12th overall), second-largest rail center, sixth-largest steel producer, and eighth-largest manufacturer.

== Employment ==
Employment in Buffalo shifted as its population declined and manufacturing diminished. Buffalo's 2005 unemployment rate was 6.6%, in contrast to New York State's 5.0% rate. From the fourth quarter of 2005 to the fourth quarter of 2006, Erie County had no net job growth, ranking it 271st among the 326 largest counties in the country. The area has recently seen an upswing in job growth; unemployment has dropped to only 4.9% in July 2007 from 5.2% in 2006 and 6.6% in 2005. The area's manufacturing sector has continued to show the largest losses in jobs, with over 17,000 fewer than at the start of 2006. In contrast, educational and health services added over 30,400 jobs in 2006, and over 20,500 jobs have been added in the business and finance sectors.

== Life sciences ==
Buffalo has become a center for bioinformatics and human genome research, such as that done by researchers at the University at Buffalo and Roswell Park Comprehensive Cancer Center. This consortium is known as the Buffalo Niagara Medical Campus. It also includes: Buffalo Hearing & Speech Center, Buffalo Medical Group Foundation, Hauptman-Woodward Medical Research Institute, Kaleida Health, Olmsted Center for the Visually Impaired, Cleveland BioLabs, and Upstate New York Transplant Services. The DNA samples used in The Human Genome Project were also collected from anonymous donors from Buffalo.

Entrepreneurial resources and life science business consultants accelerate the growth and development of emerging companies found within the Buffalo Niagara Medical Campus and Upstate New York Region. For example, Buffalo BioSciences is a technology commercialization partner to the New York State Center of Excellence in Bioinformatics & Life Sciences and contributed to the launch and early success of Empire Genomics - a firm based on research conducted at Roswell Park Comprehensive Cancer Center by Dr. Norma Nowak enabling the delivery of personalized medicine.

== Banking ==
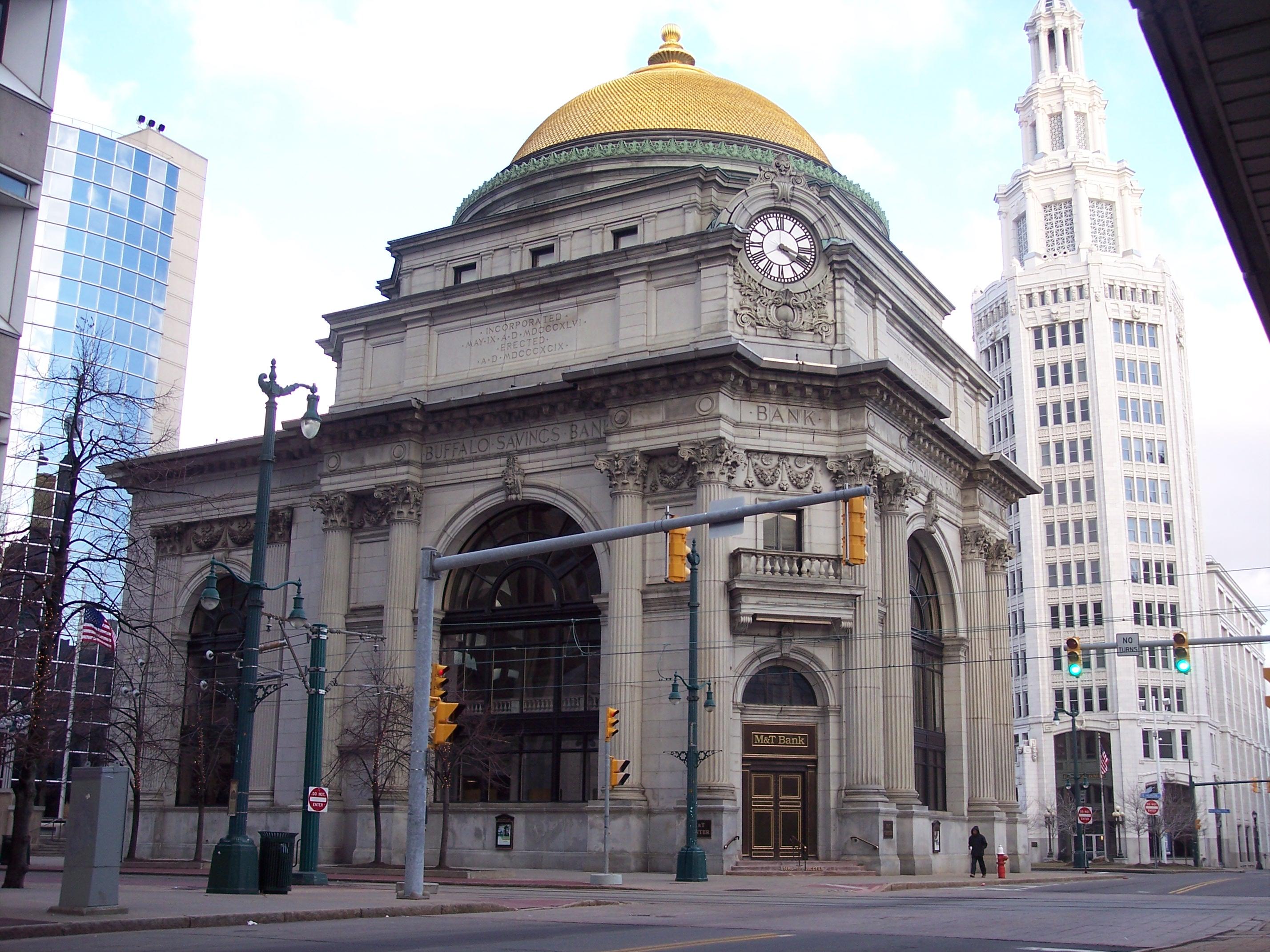
Buffalo Savings Bank Building

Buffalo is the headquarters of M&T Bank, a large regional bank with assets over $79B (as of June 2011). Its rival Marine Midland Bank operated for decades from downtown Buffalo before being acquired by HSBC and being rebranded as HSBC Bank USA. HSBC has reduced its local operations in Buffalo and Upstate NY as a whole, closing its retail banking centers. Many of the shuttered HSBC retail banking centers in upstate were acquired by First Niagara Bank. Other banks, such as Bank of America and KeyBank, have corporate operations in Buffalo, the latter expanding its operations after acquiring First Niagara. Citigroup also has regional offices in Amherst with roughly thirty-nine thousand people, Buffalo's largest suburb. Buffalo has also become a hub of the debt collection industry.

First Niagara Bank had recently moved its headquarters to downtown Buffalo from nearby Lockport. It had branches from Buffalo to Albany, New York, and since September 2009 has had branches as far south as Pittsburgh. On September 10, 2009, First Niagara announced the relocation of its corporate headquarters from Lockport to downtown Buffalo. First Niagara, which had been considering expanding into Western Pennsylvania for some time, benefited from PNC Financial Services being required by the United States Department of Justice to sell off 50 National City branches in the Pittsburgh area and 11 more branches in and around Erie to competitors. PNC Financial Services had acquired National City with funds from the $700 billion bailout plan after National City became a victim of the subprime mortgage crisis. PNC Financial Services and First Niagara Bank had significant overlap in Western Pennsylvania and had potential antitrust issues in that area. First Niagara took advantage by buying 57 of the 61 National City branches from PNC that had to be divested. The move affected the area by creating 200 more jobs, some in the Buffalo area. On July 31, 2011, it was announced that First Niagara had acquired all of HSBC Banks Western New York branches; after closing some and selling other branches to its competitors, its total number in Upstate New York had almost doubled. In 2015, First Niagara was acquired by KeyBank.

== Other ==
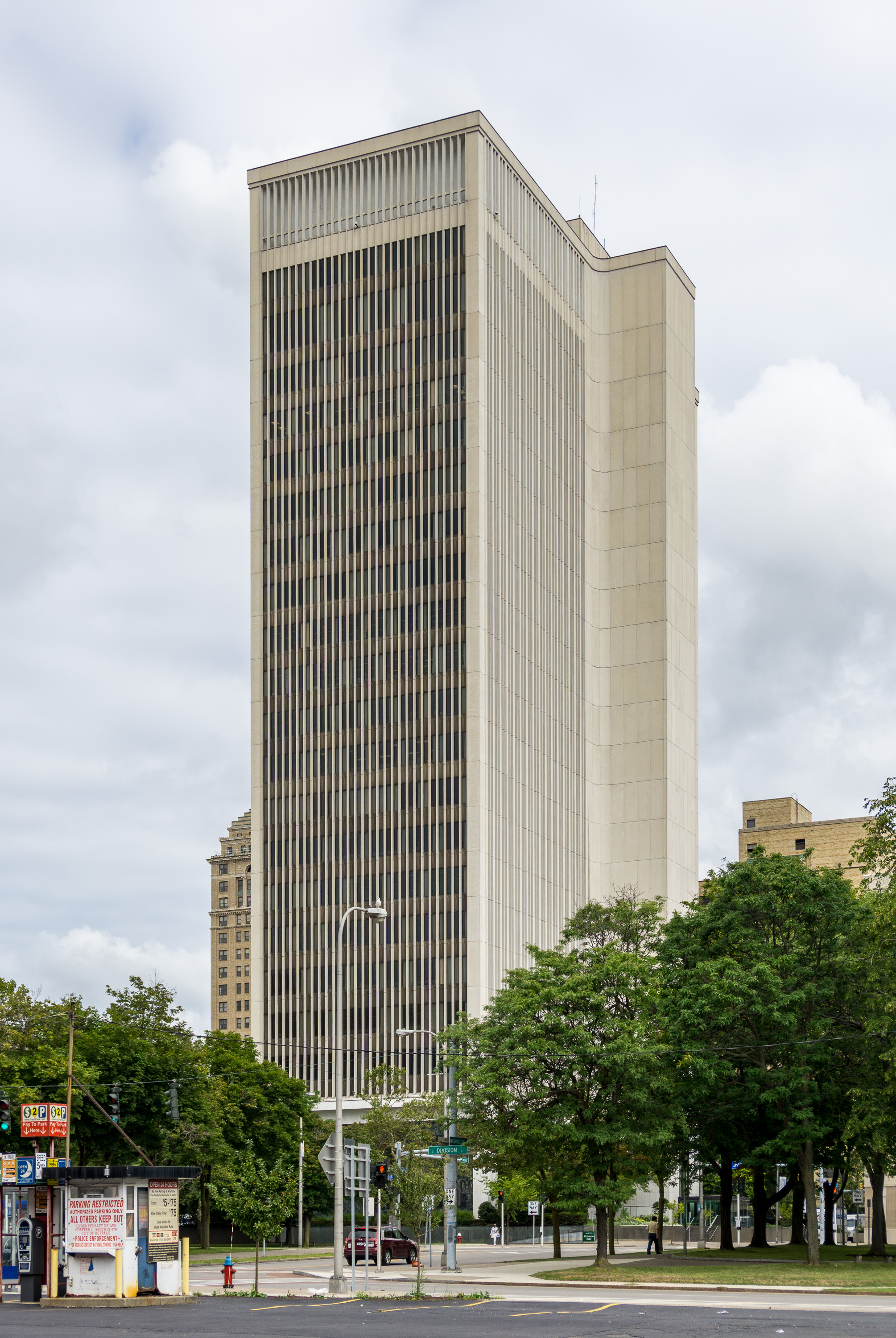
One M&T Plaza, the headquarters of M&T Bank.

Buffalo is home to Rich Products, one of the world's largest family-owned food manufacturers. Canadian brewer Labatt moved its US headquarters to Buffalo in May 2007. This is in large part due to Buffalo's location directly in the middle of the Northeastern Trade Corridor. Over 80% of all U.S.-Canada trade occurs via border crossings in the eastern United States, and with five bridges to Canada, the Buffalo area is one of the key eastern border crossing locations. Cheese company Sorrento Lactalis is also based in Buffalo. General Mills has a cereal mill in the city, and Tops Friendly Markets, a regional supermarket chain, remains headquartered in nearby Williamsville. Delaware North is also headquartered in Buffalo, having constructed a new building in the city's downtown recently. Del Monte Foods' Milk Bone dog biscuits are still manufactured in a small factory on the city's East Side.

New Era Cap Company, the largest sports-licensed headwear company in the United States, is based in Buffalo. It opened new headquarters in 2007 in the former Federal Reserve Building in downtown Buffalo.

The windshield wiper maker Trico, founded in Buffalo by John R. Oishei, operated three major manufacturing facilities but has since closed all of them and moved operations to Mexico. In 1998, the company's head office moved to Rochester Hills, Michigan. Trico's Plant No. 1 was placed on the National Register of Historic Places in 2001 and in 2014 was being re-developed by the State University of New York at Buffalo. The John R. Oishei Foundation is western New York's largest, and the new Women's & Children's Hospital, scheduled to open in 2015, will be named the John R. Oishei Children's Hospital.

For many years, Buffalo was the nation's second-largest rail center, after Chicago. Peak traffic was reached during World War II, but declined soon after the war. Through the 1960s and 1970s freight traffic via Buffalo declined, air travel and the New York State Thruway took railway passengers away as well. By 1980, the rail hub in the city was gone.

Regionally based insurance companies that have maintained their headquarters in Buffalo, New York, include Merchants Insurance Group and Lawley Insurance. Merchants Insurance Group is a property and casualty insurance company that provides commercial, personal property, and casualty insurance throughout the Northeast and North Central United States. Lawley Insurance provides commercial insurance, employee benefits, risk management, and personal insurance.

Some industry remains in Buffalo and its surrounding area in the 21st century. Ford maintains a stamping plant in South Buffalo. General Motors also runs the Tonawanda Engine plant by the Niagara River, and there are additional chemical and technology companies that continue to operate factories throughout the city and region. In addition, Tesla has partnered with Panasonic and New York State to operate Gigafactory 2 on the former Republic Steel site. The facility, which opened in 2017, manufactures photovoltaic modules for Tesla's SolarCity subsidiary and will gradually phase into manufacturing individual solar cells. It is the largest facility of its type in the Western Hemisphere. The current incarnation of Republic Steel still maintains a facility in nearby Blasdell.

43 North is a venture capital startup competition funded from the Buffalo Billion program. It awards $5 million to its winners annually, while also offering them mentorship, workspace in the Buffalo Niagara Medical Campus, and tax incentives from the state of New York, among other benefits.

== Standard of living ==
The loss of manufacturing jobs, rapid suburbanization, and high costs of labor have led to economic decline, making Buffalo one of the poorest among U.S. cities with populations of more than 250,000 people. An estimated 28.7–29.9% of Buffalo residents live below the poverty line, behind Detroit and Cleveland. Buffalo's median household income of $27,850 is third-lowest among large cities, behind only Miami and Cleveland; however, the median household income for the metropolitan area is $57,000.

The Buffalo-Niagara Falls metropolitan area has the most affordable housing market in the U.S. today. The quarterly NAHB/Wells Fargo Housing Opportunity Index (HOI) noted that nearly 90% of the new and existing homes sold in the metropolitan area during the second quarter were affordable to families earning the area's median income of $57,000. The area median price of homes was $75,000.

Buffalo faces issues with vacant and abandoned houses, as the city ranks second to St. Louis on the list of American cities with the most vacant properties per capita. Since 2000, the city has torn down 2,000 vacant homes, but as many as 10,000 still remain. Mayor Byron W. Brown recently unveiled a $100 million, five-year plan to demolish 5,000 more houses. The city's move away from heavy industry and toward a service and bioinformatics economy has brought improved air and water quality, which benefits not only residents and tourists but the bioregion as a whole. In July 2005, Reader's Digest ranked Buffalo as the third cleanest large city in the nation.

Buffalo's economy has begun to see significant improvements since the early 2010s. Money from Governor Andrew Cuomo, plans for different construction programs, and hundreds of new jobs have brought strong economic change to the area.

== Principal employers ==
According to the city's 2019 Comprehensive Annual Financial Report, the principal employers in the Buffalo Metropolitan Area are:

#	Employer	# of Employees
1	State of New York	23,600
2	Federal Executive Board (United States of America)	15,000
3	Kaleida Health	8,301
4	M&T Bank	7,400
5	Catholic Health	7,184
6	University at Buffalo	7,076
7	Buffalo City School District	6,528
8	Tops Markets	5,374
9	Erie County	5,010
10	Erie County Medical Center	3,450

== Major companies located in the Buffalo Niagara metro area ==
This is an incomplete list of notable companies with major operations or headquarters in Buffalo or within the surrounding area.

References:

- Alfred State College
- Alfred University
- Astronics Corporation
- Aurubis
- Bank of America
- Blue Cross Blue Shield (Western NY headquarters)
- The Buffalo News in Canalside
- Computer Task Group
- University at Buffalo
- Canisius College
- Catholic Health
- Charter Communications
- Citigroup
- Cummins
- Cutco in Olean (headquarters)
- Delaware North in downtown (headquarters)
- Dresser-Rand Group
- DuPont
- Ellicott Development Co.
- Empire Genomics (headquarters)
- Fisher-Price in East Aurora
- Ford Motor Company (Buffalo Stamping Plant)
- GEICO in Amherst
- General Mills in Canalside
- General Motors (Tonawanda Engine)
- HSBC Bank USA in downtown
- Ingram Micro
- Kaleida Health
- Keybank in Larkinville
- Labatt Brewing Company in downtown (U.S. headquarters)
- Life Storage in Williamsville, NY
- Linde
- Mighty Taco
- Moog Inc. in East Aurora (headquarters)
- M&T Bank in downtown (headquarters)
- New Era Cap Company in downtown (headquarters)
- National Fuel Gas in Williamsville (headquarters)
- Nestlé Purina PetCare
- Niagara Falls Memorial Medical Center in Niagara Falls
- Niagara University in Lewiston
- NOCO Energy Corporation in Tonawanda (headquarters)
- OnCore Golf (headquarters)
- Pegula Sports and Entertainment in Canalside (headquarters)
- People Inc.
- Perry's Ice Cream
- Rich Products (headquarters)
- Republic Steel in Blasdell
- Roswell Park Comprehensive Cancer Center
- Seneca Gaming Corp
  - Seneca Niagara Casino
  - Seneca Buffalo Creek Casino
  - Seneca Allegany Casino
- Saint-Gobain Corp.
- Solar Liberty
- SPoT Coffee
- Sumitomo Rubber USA LLC
- Synacor (headquarters)
- Tesla, Inc./SolarCity in South Buffalo (Gigafactory 2)
- Tops Markets in Williamsville (headquarters)
- Univera Healthcare
- Wegmans
