= Nichols School =

Private school in Buffalo, New York, US

Coordinates: 42.942025°N 78.857666°W

Location
- 1250 Amherst Street; Buffalo, New York; United States

Information
- Type: Private, Day
- Established: 1892
- CEEB code: 331080
- NCES School ID: 00937745
- Chair: Andrew Fors
- Interim Head of School: Scott R. Reisinger
- Teaching staff: 88 (2017–2018)
- Grades: 5-12
- Enrollment: 555 (2024-25)
- Average class size: 14 students
- Student to teacher ratio: 8:1
- Campus size: 30 acres
- Campus type: Urban
- Colors: Green and white
- Athletics conference: NYSAISAA
- Mascot: Viking
- Endowment: $30 million
- Tuition: $30,175 (5–8) $32,375 (9–12)
- Affiliations: NYSAIS
- Website: http://www.nicholsschool.org/

Nichols School is a private, non-denominational, co-educational college-preparatory day school in Buffalo, New York, United States. The average enrollment is 565 students with an average Upper School grade/class size of 100 students. The average classroom size is 14 students.

== History ==
Nichols School was founded in 1892 by William Nichols. The school was founded as an all-boys school with its campus on Amherst Street in North Buffalo. After many years of remaining an all boys school, it joined with Nottingham Academy, an all-girls school, becoming a co-ed Middle and Upper School. The Upper School was located on the original campus, and the Middle School was located on Nottingham Terrace. In 2001, a new Middle School building was constructed on the main campus, attaching itself to an older building on campus. That building used to be home to the basketball court and swimming pool, which have been converted into the dance studio and music room, respectively. In addition to the new Middle School facility, two new gyms were built, with squash courts added to accommodate the school's squash team. In 2011, construction was finished on the new mathematics and science building, Center '63. This new building was built to replace Moot Hall, the old math and science building.

=== Location ===
Nichols School is located on 30 acres (120,000 m^{2}) in North Buffalo, within walking distance of the Buffalo Zoo, Delaware Park, and the Albright-Knox Art Gallery. The Nichols campus includes seven separate buildings linked by tree-lined sidewalks and an indoor passageway. The campus consolidation project, completed in August 2001, joined the Middle and Upper school divisions. Each division has separate academic buildings, and shares dining, athletic, and performing arts facilities.

=== Students ===
Students are from the general Buffalo area, commuting from as far as Southern Ontario, Batavia, New York, and Ellicottville, New York, an organic expansion of its traditional turf according to Director of Admissions Nina Barone.

== Accreditation and honors ==
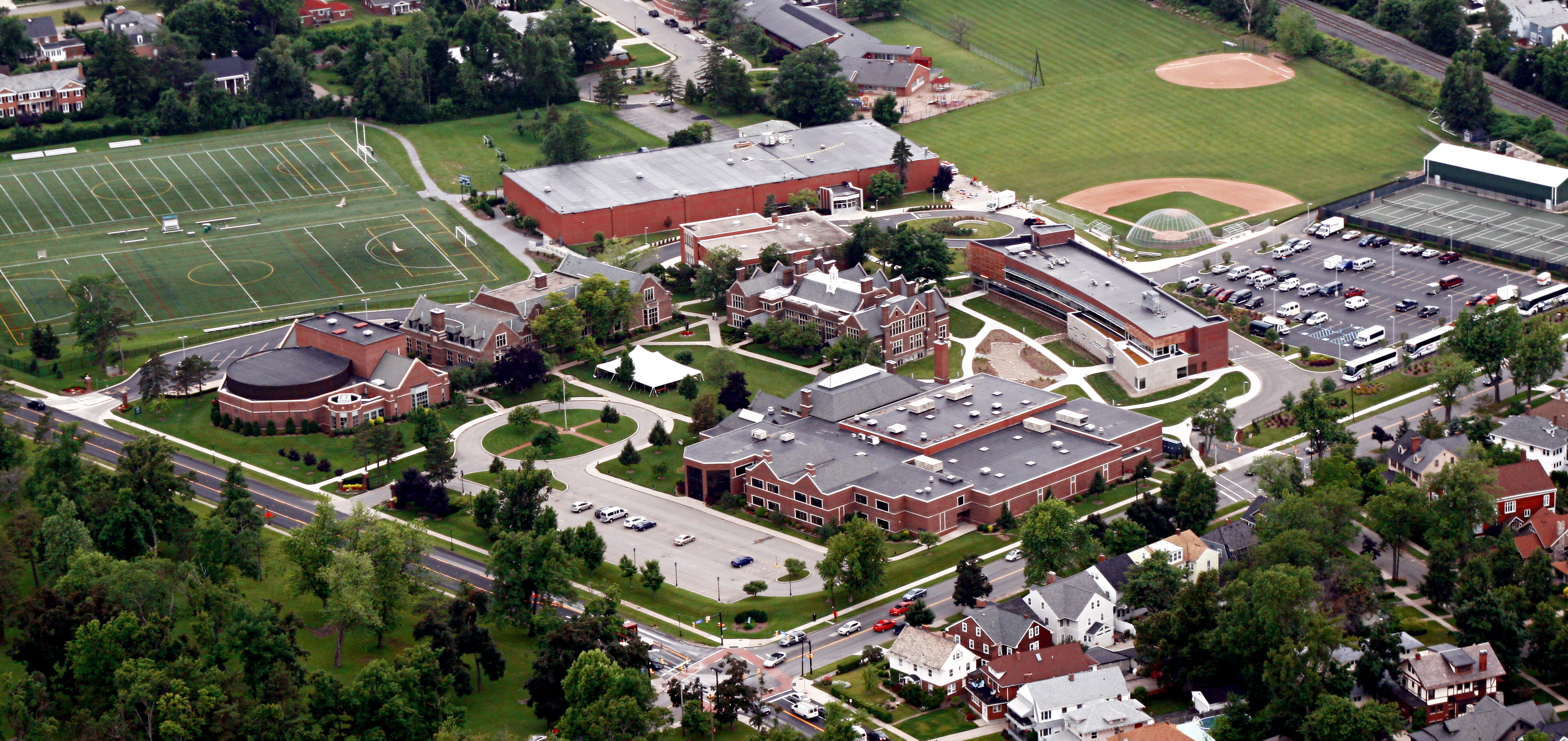
An aerial view of the Nichols School campus in Buffalo, N.Y., circa 2010.

Nichols is accredited by the New York State Association of Independent Schools and the New York State Department of Education. It received national recognition in the Secondary School Recognition Program and Exemplary Private School Recognition Program. Nichols is a member of the National Association of Independent Schools.

Nichols, along with other local private schools (including Buffalo Seminary, Canisius High School, and Park School of Buffalo), does not administer Regents exams.

== Faculty ==
Of the faculty at Nichols, 10% have doctoral degrees; 75% have master's degrees; and 14% of the faculty are Nichols graduates. Faculty have an average of 20 years of service and serve as student advisers, coaches, club advisers and mentors.

== Athletics ==
The Upper School conducts an extensive interscholastic athletic program. Most teams have tryouts, mandatory practices and matches after school hours and play in competitive leagues throughout Western New York and Canada.

Offered Varsity Sports: Fall:

- Cross Country (Men/Women)
- Field Hockey (Women)
- Golf (Men)
- Sailing (Co-ed)
- Soccer (Men/Women)
- Tennis (Women)
- Volleyball (Women)

Winter:

- Basketball (Men/Women)
- Crew (Men/Women)
- Hockey (Men/Women)
- Squash (Men/Women)
- Track & Field (Men/Women)

Spring:

- Baseball (Men)
- Crew (Men/Women)
- Flag Football (Women)
- Golf (Women)
- Lacrosse (Men/Women)
- Softball (Women)
- Tennis (Men)
- Track & Field (Men/Women)

Intramural sports where anyone can join a team dominate in the Middle School. The number of teams is dictated by the level of interest, practices take place during the daily sports period, and most teams play other local middle schools.

== Arts ==
The 480-seat Flickinger Performing Arts Center is the centerpiece of the performing arts department, while visual arts studios support course offerings in drawing, painting, sculpture, ceramics, photography, video and graphic art.

The arts are promoted as a serious course of study and the school requires that all students engage in some form of participation. Artistic achievement is highlighted not only in plays and exhibitions, but also in morning meetings, where students often share their talents with the rest of the school. Students are encouraged to use the arts as a vehicle through which to find their own voices. In addition to studying and performing the work of renowned artists, original student work is featured on the walls of every building on the campus and on the floorboards of every stage. Students have the opportunity to compose music, write plays, choreograph dances, make their own films or curate their own art opening.

== Multiculturalism and international initiatives ==
Nichols School has four different exchange programs for upper school students: Costa Rica, Spain, France, and China. Nichols students host an international student for three weeks, and then travel abroad and stay with that student and their family for an average of three weeks. While abroad, students attend classes at the hosting institution and travel to historical and cultural sites of importance. Students can participate in more than one exchange: historically, many Spanish students travel to Costa Rica sophomore year and Spain in junior or senior year.

== Extracurricular activities ==
Nichols offers a variety of extracurricular clubs, activities, trips and community service opportunities to students. There are more than 40 upper school campus clubs; clubs from recent years include Anti-Gravity Club, Art Activism for Social Change, BABEL Book Club, Backgammon Club, Broomball Club, Cheese Club, Star Wars Club, Chess Club, Chorus, Community Service Club, Dance Marathon, Drone Club, Fashion Design Club, Feministas, Fight Club, Film Club, Forensics Club, Free Draw Club, French Club, Fundraising Club, Gang Green, Green Key, HEART Club, Investment Club, Jazz Band, Jewish Cultural Awareness Club, Math League, Masterminds, Mock Trial, Model UN, Nordic Sports, Orchestra, Peace Club, Pen Pal Club, Photography Club, Robotics, Science Olympiad, SeeArtRun, Sexuality and Gender Awareness, Ski Club, SEA, Soup Kitchen Club, Student Council, SUMA, VIVE, and Young Democrats, as well as student publications like the Gleaner Literary Magazine, the Viking Gazette, and the school yearbook, the Verdian.

Mock Trial and Model UN participate in local and regional competitions. Anti-Gravity Club, the school's outdoors and climbing club, sponsors multiple trips to the Niagara Climbing Center and Niagara Gorge in addition to an annual winter hiking, cross-country skiing and ice-climbing trip to Keene Valley in the Adirondack Mountains. The Research Scholars Program provides students with the opportunity to engage in independent research projects at local institutions. The Science Scholar program works with SUNY Buffalo, Roswell Park Comprehensive Cancer Center, and the Hauptman-Woodward Medical Research Institute. The Humanities Scholar program gives seniors the opportunity to conduct humanities research at SUNY Buffalo. SeeArtRun is an entirely student-run art gallery. Students have the opportunity to display their art in a gallery on campus, and often host gallery openings as popular campus events. SEA, or Students for Environmental Awareness, works with organizations dedicated to providing drinking water and promoting environmental initiatives abroad. SEA also actively promotes environmental programs on campus and in the local community.

== Notable alumni ==
=== Arts ===
- Laylah Ali 1986, contemporary visual artist
- Michael Angelakos 2005, lead singer of Passion Pit
- Cory Arcangel 1996, artist
- Nick Bakay 1977, television actor, writer, and producer
- Nanette Burstein 1988, filmmaker
- Elizabeth Cappuccino 2013, film and television actor
- A. R. Gurney 1947, playwright
- Brigid Hughes 1990, literary editor
- David D. Kirkpatrick 1988, journalist
- Karl Koch 1987, recording artist; Weezer webmaster
- Adam Lippes, fashion designer
- David Milch 1962, Emmy-nominated television writer and producer
- John Michael Montias, art historian
- Ed Park 1988, journalist and novelist
- Eyal Press 1988, author and journalist
- Brian Sacca 1997, actor and screenwriter
- Dave Schulz 1990, musician
- David Shire 1955, composer
- John Wray 1989, novelist
- Suzi Yoonessi 1996(?), filmmaker

=== Athletics ===
- Peter Ciavaglia 1987, NHL player
- Maddie Elia 2013, NWHL player, 2018–19 league MVP
- Jeff Farkas 1996, NHL player
- Mirann Gacioch 2022, NWSL player
- Katy Knoll 2019, PWHL player
- Les Kuntar 1987, NHL player
- Christian Laettner 1988, NBA player
- Eric Lux 2006, racing driver, 2022 24 Hours of Daytona LMP2 class winner
- Tory Mariano 2021, PWHL draftee
- Joey Muldowney 2022, NCAA hockey player and NHL draftee
- Chris Mueller 2004, NHL player
- Brooks Orpik 1998, NHL player, Olympic Silver Medalist
- Ray Peters 1965, MLB player, first round pick in 1970 draft
- Emily Pfalzer 2011, hockey player, Olympic Gold Medalist United States women's national ice hockey team
- Emily Regan 2006, rower, Olympic Gold Medalist
- Hayley Scamurra 2013, Olympic Gold Medalist, PWHL player
- Ryan Sittler 1992, NHL first round draft pick
- Bobby Shuttleworth 2004, MLS goalkeeper
- Scott Thomas 1989, NHL player
- Linda Ullmark 2024, NWSL player
- Ward Wettlaufer 1954, amateur golfer

=== Business ===
- Anson Conger Goodyear, businessman, philanthropist, author, founder of the Museum of Modern Art
- Robert T. Grieves 1972, Chairman of the American Chamber of Commerce in Hong Kong
- Arthur Hayes 2004, entrepreneur, and co-founder and former CEO of cryptocurrency exchange BitMEX
- Charlie Jacobs 1990, CEO of Delaware North's Boston Holdings, including the Boston Bruins
- Jerry Jacobs Jr. 1981, Co-CEO of Delaware North
- Lou Jacobs 1982, Co-CEO of Delaware North
- Robert E. Rich, Jr. 1959, Chairman of Rich Products Corporation
- Sameera Fazili 1996, deputy director of the National Economic Council (United States)

=== Politics ===
- Piper Campbell 1984, United States Ambassador to Mongolia
- William H. Donaldson 1949, chairman of the U.S. Securities and Exchange Commission
- Edward Rath III, member of the New York State Senate
- Neil Chatterjee, former commissioner and chairman of the Federal Energy Regulatory Commission

=== Science ===
- Eric Berlow 1984, ecologist, entrepreneur
- Brendan Hassett 1988, mathematician
- Michael Roizen, MD 1963, Chief Wellness Officer at the Cleveland Clinic, Cofounder of RealAge, Inc., TV guest expert and best-selling author
