= Jerry Jacobs Jr. =

American businessman (born 1962)

- Born: Jeremy Maurice Jacobs Jr. August 22, 1962 (age 64); Buffalo, New York
- Education: Georgetown University (BA); University of Pennsylvania (MBA)
- Occupation: Co-Chief Executive Officer of Delaware North
- Spouse: Alice Carroll French
- Father: Jeremy Jacobs
- Relatives: Chris Jacobs (cousin); Charlie Jacobs (brother)

Jeremy Maurice Jacobs Jr. (born August 22, 1962) is an American businessman who is the co-chief executive officer of Delaware North and an alternate governor for the Boston Bruins.

== Early life and education ==
Jacobs was born in Buffalo, New York, the son of billionaire businessman Jeremy Jacobs. After graduating from Nichols School in 1981, Jacobs earned an undergraduate degree from Georgetown University in 1985. He is an alumni admissions interviewer. Jacobs received an MBA from the Wharton School of Business at the University of Pennsylvania.

== Career ==
Jacobs joined Delaware North in 1989. He was named chairman of the Sportservice Division in 1995. In this role, he helped expand the company's sports holdings. He won contracts with teams & venues like the St. Louis Cardinals, the Chicago Bears, and Wembley Stadium in London. In 2001, Jacobs was named to Sports Business Journal's "Forty Under 40" list in recognition of his significant contributions to the industry. His brothers, Lou and Charlie joined him on the list in 2003 and 2009, respectively.

On January 6, 2015 Delaware North chairman Jeremy Jacobs Sr. relinquished the title of CEO and named Jerry Jacobs Jr., along with his brother Louis Jacobs, co-heads of the company.

Jacobs is on the Georgetown University Board of Regents and the Nichols School board of trustees. He is on the United Way's advisory board.

In 2014, Jacobs was appointed to the United States Department of Commerce's Travel and Tourism Advisory Board by Secretary Penny Pritzker. The Travel and Tourism Advisory Board advises the secretary of commerce on travel and tourism policy and infrastructure. Jacobs is on US Travel Insurance Association's CEO Roundtable.

== Personal life ==
In 1990, Jacobs married Alice Carroll French, an attorney, in a Presbyterian ceremony. Jacobs' brother, Charlie Jacobs, is the CEO of Delaware North. A cousin, Chris Jacobs is a politician who was a member of the New York State Senate, Secretary of State of New York, and County Clerk of Erie County.
