= Ian's Walk =

1998 book by Laurie Lears

Ian's Walk: A Story About Autism
- The cover of Ian's Walk
- Author: Laurie Lears
- Illustrator: Karen Ritz
- Language: English
- Subject: Autism
- Publisher: Albert Whitman & Company
- Publication date: 1998
- Pages: 32
- ISBN: 978-0-8075-3481-6

Ian's Walk: A Story About Autism is a book about autism by Laurie Lears, who also wrote Waiting for Mr. Goose, a book about Attention Deficit Hyperactivity Disorder. The story tells of a child with autism, and a walk with his sisters (who are frustrated with his stereotypical behaviour), and how they begin to understand him after he wanders off. Ian's Walk is regarded as a useful tool to help family members of children with autism understand associated behaviours.

== Plot ==
Ian's Walk tells the story of a child with autism named Ian. Ian displays behaviour which is stereotypical for children with autism, to the dismay of his sister Julie. Julie and Tara (the oldest sibling) decide to go for a walk to the park, but their mother says that Ian must go with them. During the walk Julie describes Ian's behaviour to the reader, and describes her frustration and embarrassment with it, and Ian. Along the walk Ian goes missing, causing Julie to panic. She decides to "think like Ian" and finds him at his favourite spot. She takes him home, and begins to appreciate and accept how different he is.

== Reception and use as an educational resource ==
Ian's Walk is described as being "straightforward and honest. It evokes compassion without pity", with the depictions of Ian being "accurate and authentic". A Booklist review says; "Through its simple plot, the story conveys a complex family relationship and demonstrates the ambivalent emotions Julie feels about her autistic brother."

Ian's Walk is recommended to help adults and children (particularly siblings of children with autism) understand how children with autism are different. One critic commented, "it does not give enough specific information to be truly useful". The medium used (a picture-book with watercolour illustrations by Karen Ritz) might not be enough to be useful for an older audience, but is appealing to younger readers as in introduction to autism and the associated behaviours. Roseane Steitz's review said the book is aimed at a 6 to 9 year old audience and that it could be used for bibliotherapy or in a class that includes autistic children. The book contains an explanatory preface for parents by Carol P. Rolland, Chief Psychologist, Developmental Pediatrics, and Mary Kay McGuire, Sibling Program Director at Illinois Masonic Medical Center. The Museum of Disability History has developed a lesson plan based on this book for kindergarten to second grade classes.
