= Rick Abramson =

American businessman

Rick Abramson was the chief operating officer and executive vice president of Delaware North. He got his start as a food vendor in Milwaukee, and was employed by Delaware North for 54 years. Abramson stepped down in October 2020.

== Career ==
Abramson has management responsibility for Delaware North's business operations around the world, including its sports, parks, airports, gaming and restaurant and hospitality businesses.

He previously served as President of Delaware North Parks & Resorts, executive chairman of Delaware North Australia and Asia, chief executive officer of Australian Venue Services, and president of Delaware North Sportservice, overseeing the establishment of the Chicago Sports Depot outside U.S. Cellular Field and innovative retail experiences for the Jets and Giants at MetLife Stadium.

=== NASA ===
In 2002, Abramson was awarded the NASA Public Service Medal, NASA's highest achievement award for non-government employees, for his role in educating and inspiring millions of guests at the Kennedy Space Center Visitor Complex, where he served as president and Chief Operating Officer. Also in 2002, Abramson joined the ranks of some of the most respected members of the space program when he earned the Dr. Kurt H. Debus Award from the National Space Club Florida Committee.

Abramson also served as the president and chief operating officer of Kennedy Space Center Visitor Complex, where he oversaw a $130 million redevelopment initiative that included opening the Apollo/Saturn V Center, International Space Station Center and Launch Complex 39 Observation Gantry. Additionally, he managed the opening of several educational programs and exhibits, such as Astronaut Encounter, Mad Mission to Mars 2025, Early Space Exploration, Exploration in the New Millennium, and the Dr. Kurt H. Debus Conference Facility.

== Personal ==
Abramson is credited with creating Secret Stadium Sauce – a condiment popular at Milwaukee Brewers baseball games.
