= Jeremy Jacobs =

American ice hockey executive (born 1940)

14th Chairman of the NHL Board of Governors
- In office June 22, 2007 – September 22, 2026
- Preceded by: Harley Hotchkiss
- Succeeded by: Ted Leonsis

Personal details
- Born: Jeremy Maurice Jacobs; January 21, 1940 (age 86) Buffalo, New York, U.S.
- Spouse: Margaret Jacobs
- Children: 6
- Education: University at Buffalo
- Occupation: Chairman of Delaware North
- Known for: Owner of the Boston Bruins, former owner of the Cincinnati Royals

Jeremy Maurice Jacobs Sr. (born January 21, 1940) is an American billionaire businessman, the owner of the Boston Bruins and chairman of Delaware North. Forbes magazine ranks him as 669th richest person in the world.

== Early life and education ==
Jacobs was born in 1940, the son of Genevieve (née Bibby) and Louis Jacobs. His mother was of Irish Catholic descent, and his father was the son of Jewish immigrants from Poland. The original surname of his family's paternal side was Yakobovitch. In 1915, his father and his father's two brothers, Charles and Marvin, founded a company that first owned concessions in theaters and then expanded to major league ballparks. His father took over the company in the 1950s when the health of his brothers faltered and Jeremy took over what was then known as Emprise at age 28 when his father died in 1968. Louis also at one point was the operator at the Buffalo Memorial Auditorium and owned the Buffalo Bisons of the American Hockey League and the Cincinnati Royals of the National Basketball Association. In the wake of concerns about Emprise's ties to organized crime, Jacobs reorganized it as Delaware North.

Jacobs has a Bachelor of Science degree from the State University of New York at Buffalo School of Management, and attended the six-week Harvard Business School Advanced Management Program.

== Career ==
=== Delaware North ===
Jacobs owns and operates the business founded by his father and uncles, Delaware North. Delaware North is a global hospitality and food service business headquartered in Buffalo, New York. The company operates in the lodging, sporting, airport, gaming and entertainment industries.

Delaware North also owns and manages TD Garden, home to the Boston Bruins and the Boston Celtics. It was paid for with Jacobs' own funds.

On January 6, 2015, Jacobs relinquished the title of CEO and named Jerry Jacobs Jr. and Louis Jacobs co-CEOs. He also named Charlie Jacobs CEO of Delaware North's Boston Holdings.

=== Boston Bruins ===
Jacobs was listed for several years in a row as one of Sports Business Journal's Most Influential People in Sports. He was inducted into the Sports Hall of Fame in Western New York in October 2006.

Jacobs has owned the National Hockey League's Boston Bruins since 1975. Jacobs represents the club on the NHL's Board of Governors and is on its executive committee. At their meeting in June 2007, Jacobs was elected chairman, and replaced the Calgary Flames' Harley Hotchkiss, who stepped down after 12 years.

After years of disappointing performance, Jacobs replaced numerous general managers and coaches. Harry Sinden, the longtime president of the team, retired active work and moved into an advisory role. New management included Peter Chiarelli and head coach Claude Julien. Cam Neely, a former Bruins player, was also lured back to the new organization and was named president. These changes were effective. The Bruins record in the 2008–09 season was the second best in the NHL. In 2011, the Bruins won their first Stanley Cup in 39 years after beating the Vancouver Canucks in a seven-game series.

During his tenure, Jacobs has been referred to as one of the "most militant hard-line" owners in the NHL. His ownership began when the NHL was locked in a bitter rivalry with the upstart World Hockey Association. Jacobs vehemently opposed every proposal for an amalgamation with the WHA, in large part because of the close proximity of the WHA's New England Whalers. Jacobs was one of three owners (along with the Toronto Maple Leafs' Harold Ballard and the Los Angeles Kings' Jack Kent Cooke) to vote against the 1979 agreement that saw four WHA organizations (including the Whalers) enter the older league as expansion franchises, which was not enough votes to block the so-called "merger" although Jacobs nevertheless insisted the Whalers drop their regional moniker and become the Hartford Whalers upon entering the NHL.

Jacobs was later accused of being responsible for the 2012–13 lockout. Described as "villainous" and a "bully", he was reportedly hated by the players. On the first day of the 2012–13 NHL season after the lockout ended, Jacobs blamed the Players' Association for the season's delay, saying of the union, "There was no expression of a desire to make a deal."

Jacobs responded to reports that he was a "hard-liner" in the 2012–13 NHL lockout by saying he put the good of the league ahead of his own interest in keeping the players on the ice. "I'm coming off winning a Stanley Cup (in 2011). I've got a sold-out building. I have a financially sound business. No Debt. Ownership for 37 years," he said. "I'm the last guy that wants to shut this down – absolutely the last one out there."

Despite relinquishing the role of CEO to his son Charlie, he remains very active in the team and held the title of NHL Chairman of the Board of Governors until stepping down in 2026.

Forbes estimated his net worth to be US$2.8 billion in November 2021.

== Philanthropy ==
In 2007, Jacobs donated $1 million to support an endowed chair in immunology at Roswell Park Comprehensive Cancer Center. The gift was made to Roswell Park's Leaders for Life endowment campaign in honor of Jacobs' brother, the late Dr. Lawrence D. Jacobs, an immunology researcher who died in 2001.

The University at Buffalo received a $10 million gift from Jacobs, his wife Margaret, and other family members on June 11, 2008, to establish the Jacobs Institute. The Jacobs Institute supports research and clinical collaboration on the causes, treatment, and prevention of heart and vascular diseases. This gift was also made in honor of his late brother, Lawrence. The Jacobs' gift was at the time the largest single gift ever made to the University at Buffalo. The donation also made the Jacobs family the university's most generous donor, with gifts totaling $18.4 million. Jacobs has also served the University at Buffalo as chairman, trustee, and director of its foundation, chairman of the President's Board of Visitors, advisor to the School of Management, and as chairman of the University at Buffalo Council.

The Jacobs family and their company, Delaware North, donated $250,000 to the Martin House Restoration Project in March 2012. They had made an earlier donation of $146,000. The project aims to restore the Darwin D. Martin House in Western New York, one of Frank Lloyd Wright's designs.

In November 2012, Jacobs and his family announced a $1 million donation to the Say Yes Buffalo Scholarship. Say Yes Buffalo is "an education-based initiative that provides a powerful engine for long-term economic development, which will radically improve the life course of public school students in the City of Buffalo."

In 2013, Jacobs paid for a two-year study on the nutrition and food preferences of cancer patients. The study, called the Cancer Nutrition Consortium, focused on patient preferences and issues related to their ability to eat and drink while undergoing cancer treatment, including therapies like chemotherapy and radiation. The consortium aimed to help cancer patients make healthy choices that will support their treatment.

On April 17, 2013, Jacobs announced that he had pledged $100,000 on behalf of the Bruins and its players to The One Fund Boston to help victims of the Boston Marathon bombing and their families.

Jacobs, his wife, Margaret, and his family gave $30 million to the University at Buffalo's medical school at the Buffalo Niagara Medical Campus. The school was renamed the Jacobs School of Medicine and Biomedical Sciences. The donation is the second largest ever in school history. The donation brought the Jacobs family's total contributions to the University at Buffalo to more than $50 million.

Jacobs is also heavily involved in the funding of the Boston Bruins Foundation, which was founded and is chaired by his son Charlie. The Bruins Foundation provides grants to local organizations that seek to improve the lives of children through education, health, athletics, and a broad range of community outreach projects.

In July 2015, Jacobs donated $250,000 to Iroquois Central High School in Elma, NY for the improvement of its athletic fields. Part of Jacobs’ East Aurora, NY estate is located in Elma.

== Other activities ==
Jacobs holds honorary doctorates from the University at Buffalo, Canisius College, Johnson and Wales University, and Niagara University, where he was awarded an honorary doctor of commercial science in October 2013.

He is currently serving his second term on the U.S. Department of Commerce Travel and Tourism Advisory Board. Members of the board are selected by the Secretary of Commerce and advise the Secretary on government policies and programs that affect the U.S. travel and tourism industry.

Jacobs has made substantial contributions to the presidential campaigns of George W. Bush, John Kerry, Mitt Romney, Hillary Clinton, Joe Lieberman, and John Edwards. He reportedly contributed over $650,000 to municipal elections in the village of Wellington, Florida. The Jacobs family has been involved in a dispute with developer Mark Bellissimo over proposed development within Wellington's Equestrian Preserve of a major equestrian sports complex near his home in the village.

Jacobs also owns an interest in NESN, the New England Sports Network, sharing ownership with John Henry, a friend and owner of the Boston Red Sox.

== Personal life ==
Jacobs' father Louis was the owner of many sports teams along with his business empire that included owning the Cincinnati Royals of the National Basketball League, the Buffalo Bisons and the Providence Reds of the American Hockey League, the Buffalo Bisons of the International League in Minor League Baseball, and the Ice Follies along with being the owner of the Buffalo Memorial Auditorium and the Cincinnati Gardens.

Jacobs and his wife Margaret reside in Elma, New York and in Wellington, Florida. They have six children (three sons and three daughters), eighteen grandchildren, and two great-grandchildren. Their children are:

- Jeremy "Jerry" Maurice Jacobs Jr., co-CEO of Delaware North Companies. In 1990, he married Alice Carroll French, an attorney.
- Louis "Lou" Michael Jacobs, co-CEO of Delaware North. In 1989, Louis married Joan Babcook in Buffalo.
- Charles "Charlie" Marvin Jacobs, CEO of Delaware North's Boston Holdings. In 1999, Charlie married Kimberly Diane Warren, a model and actress.
- Margaret Lynn Jacobs, account executive at Merrill Lynch, Pierce, Fenner & Smith in New York. In 1986, she married John Bartlett Reichenbach of Carlisle, Massachusetts.
- Katie Louise Jacobs married James D. Robinson IV in 1992.
- Lisann Jane Jacobs married John Victor Holten in Buffalo, New York in 1983. They divorced; Lisann Jacobs is married to Dr. Bruce Platt.

== Awards and honors ==
- 2011 Stanley Cup champion (as owner of the Boston Bruins)
- 2015 Lester Patrick Award
- Hockey Hall of Fame (Class of 2017).

Sporting positions
Preceded by Storer Broadcasting	Boston Bruins owner 1975–present	Incumbent
Preceded by Harley Hotchkiss	Chairman of the NHL Board of Governors; 2007–2026	Succeeded by Ted Leonsis
