= The Avant =

Mixed-use high rise in Buffalo, New York

The Avant, Buffalo, New York
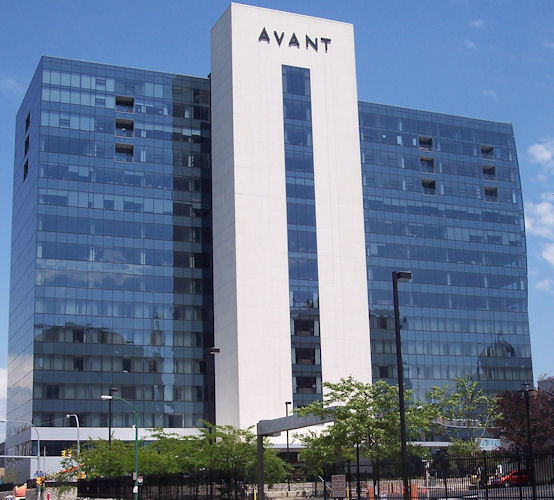
- Avant, in Buffalo, New York
- Interactive map of the The Avant, Buffalo, New York area

General information
- Status: Completed
- Type: Mixed use
- Location: 200 Delaware Avenue, Buffalo, New York, United States
- Coordinates: 42.889825°N 78.877903°W
- Completed: 1971
- Renovated: 2009
- Cost: US$ 83 million (renovation)

Height
- Roof: 63.0 m (206.7 ft)

Technical details
- Floor count: 15
- Floor area: 405,275 sq ft (37,651.3 m^{2})

Design and construction
- Architect: Stieglitz Snyder Architecture
- Developer: Uniland Development Co.

The Avant is a mixed use tower located in Buffalo, New York. The building spans an entire city block between Elmwood Ave and Delaware Ave at West Huron, and features class A office space, an Embassy Suites hotel, and the top three floors feature luxury residential condominiums. Upon its completion in 2009, the building set a record for housing the most expensive group of condominiums ever built in the Buffalo metropolitan area. Furthermore, as a result of the eco-conscious trend in national development companies, the building's remodeling is recognized as the largest recycling project in Western New York history. The building features energy efficient windows as well as underground parking and a number of other luxury amenities.

== History ==
Construction began on this building in 1969 and was completed in 1971. It was originally constructed as the Thaddeus J. Dulski Federal Building housing 50 federal agencies and workforce of nearly 1,200. The US General Services Administration, which owned and operated the building, determined in the mid-2000s that the property would be too expensive to renovate, and vacated it in 2005. Uniland and Acquest Development companies purchased the building in April 2007 for $6.1 million and began renovating it for $83 million into the current mixed-use property.

== Gallery ==
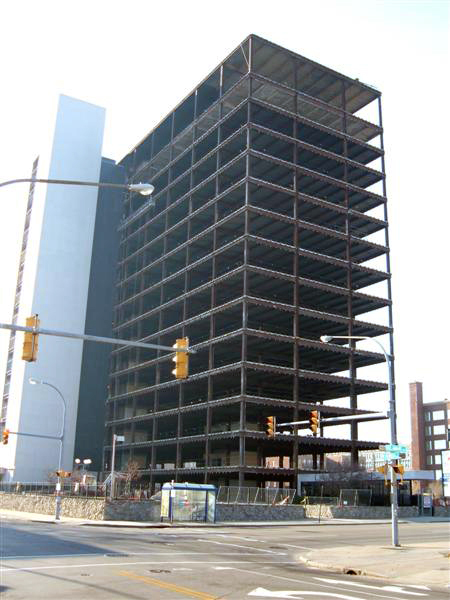
The former Thaddeus J. Dulski Federal Building completely gutted, in process of being turned into Avant, a mixed-use building, this is from April 2008.

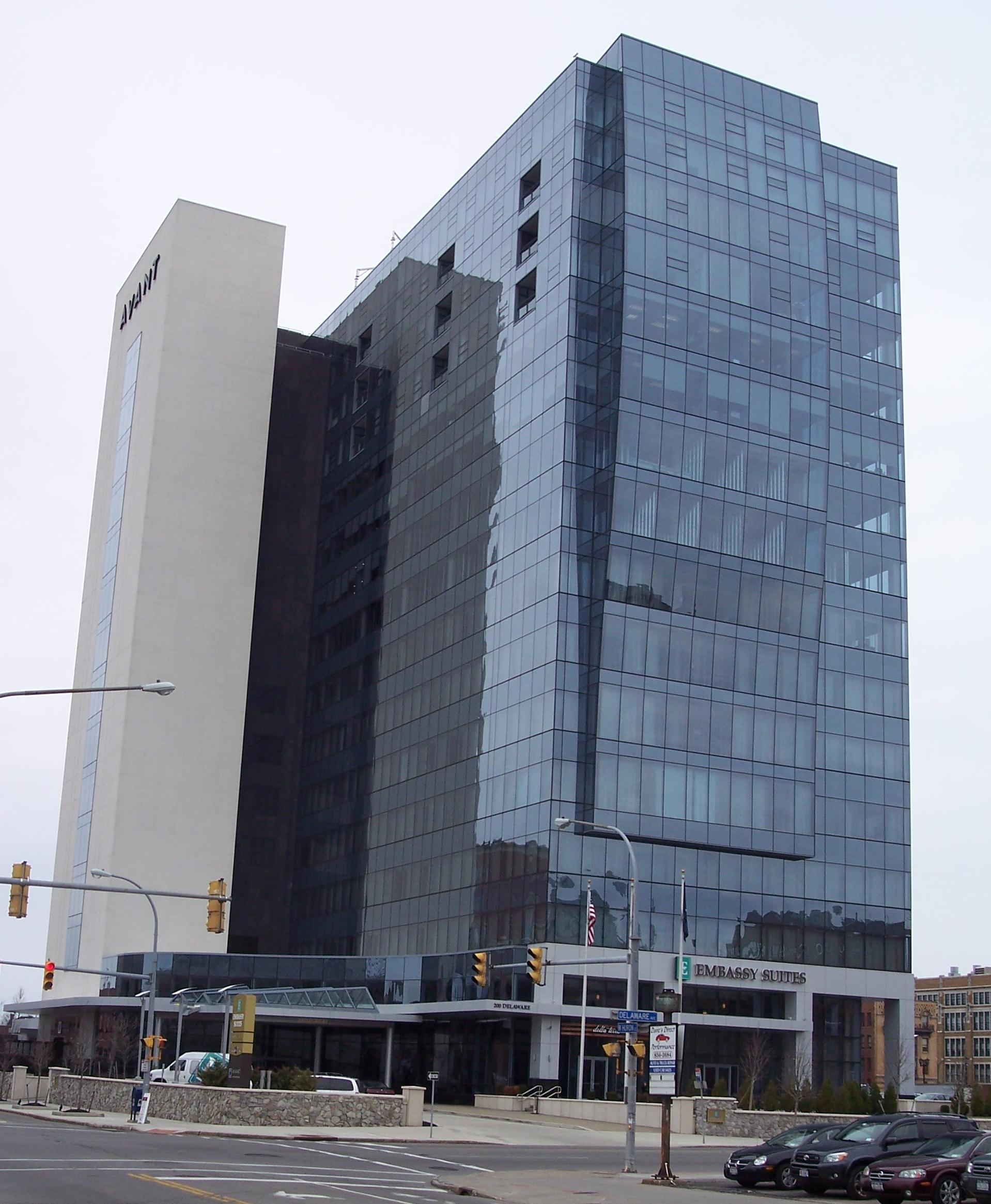
The completed Avant building, April 2011

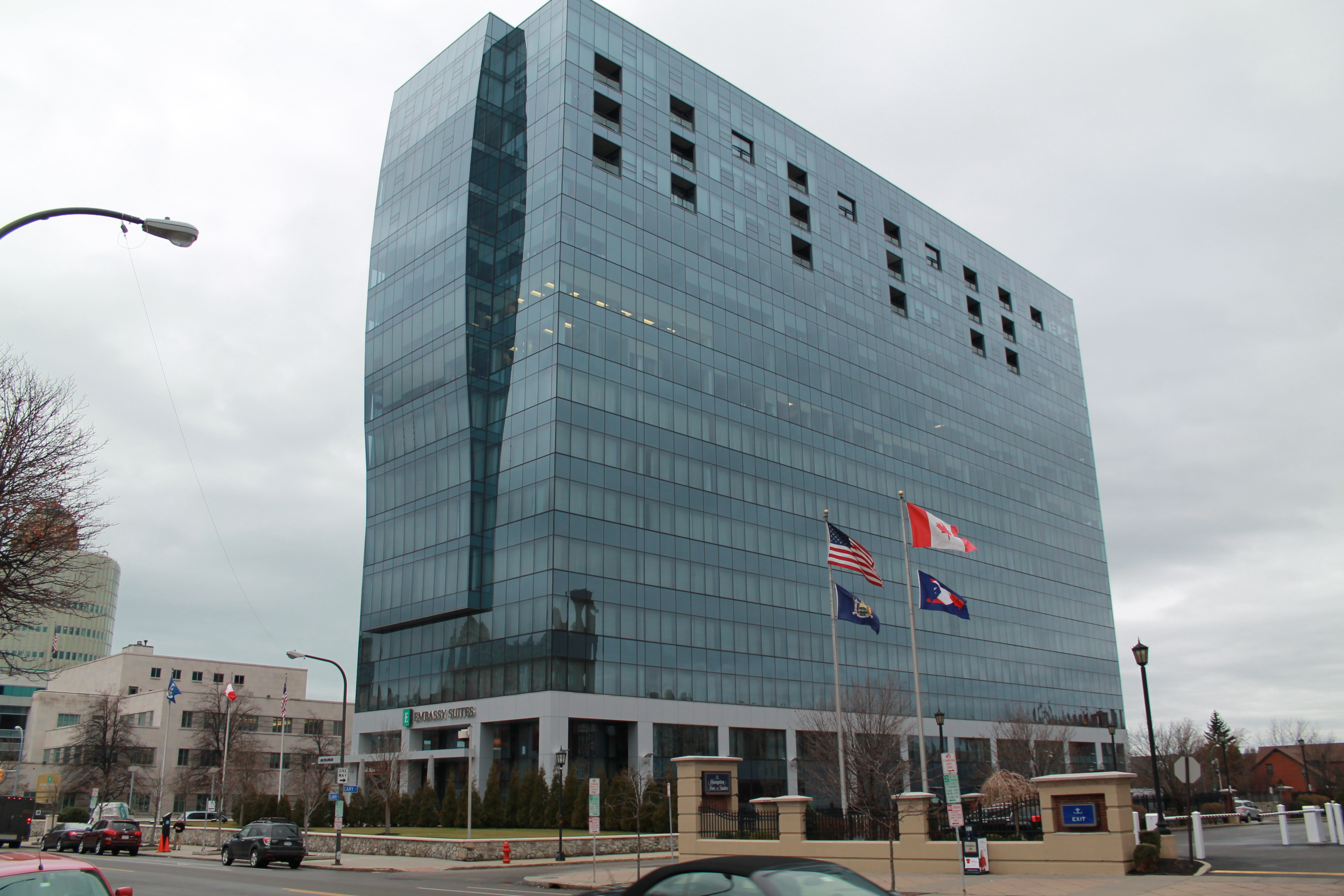
The back of the Avant building, December 2014

== See also ==
- Delaware North Building
- List of tallest buildings in Buffalo, New York
