= Mindil Beach Casino & Resort =

Casino in Darwin, Australia

Coordinates: 12°26′52″S 130°49′50″E

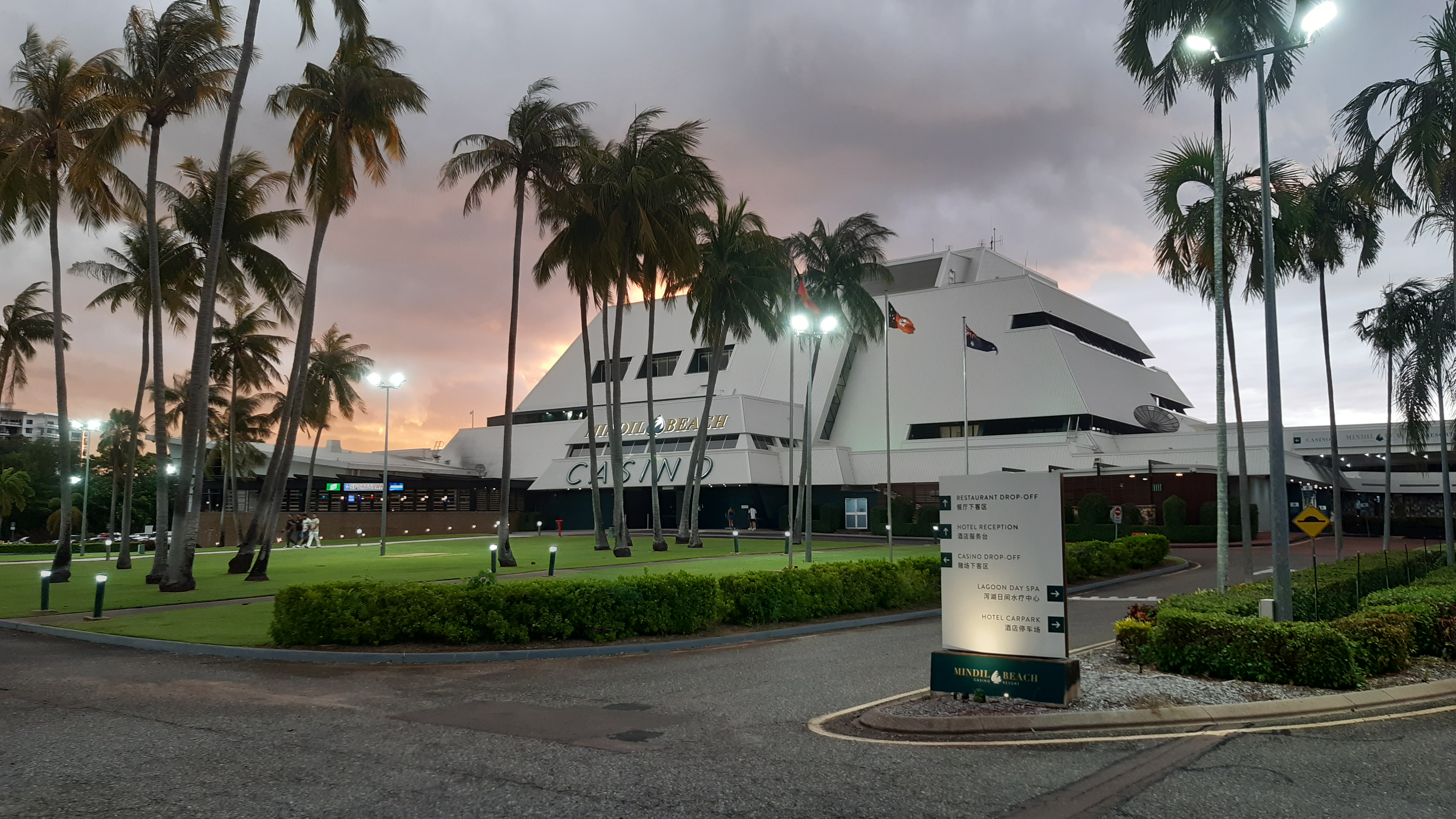
- The casino in 2025
- Interactive map of Mindil Beach Casino & Resort
- Location: Darwin, Northern Territory, Australia; Gilruth Avenue, Mindil Beach
- Opened: 1983
- No. of rooms: 117
- Casino type: Land-based
- Owner: Delaware North
- Previous names: Mindil Beach Casino; Diamond Beach Hotel and Casino; MGM Grand Darwin; SkyCity Darwin
- Website: mindilbeachcasinoresort.com.au

Mindil Beach Casino & Resort is a casino in Darwin, Northern Territory, Australia, owned and operated by Delaware North. It is the only casino in Darwin.

== History ==
=== Don Casino (1979–83) ===
The first casino in Darwin, and the second in Australia, operated at the Don Hotel, Cavenagh Street, and was granted a licence as the "Don Casino" in 1979.

=== Mindil Beach Casino (1983–85) ===
The licence was in 1983 transferred to the Mindil Beach Casino. In 1984, the Territory government forcibly acquired it, along with the Alice Springs Casino, from Federal Hotels for $50 million. A joint venture between Greate Bay Casino Corp. (owner of the Sands Atlantic City) and Aspinall Holdings (a British casino operator) was set up to operate the two casinos.

=== Diamond Beach Hotel and Casino (1985–95) ===
The Mindil Beach Casino was renamed as the Diamond Beach Hotel and Casino. Aspinall bought out Greate Bay's interest for US$1 million in 1986, and then acquired the territorial government's 17 percent interest for $5 million in 1987.

=== MGM Grand Darwin (1995–2004) ===
In 1995, MGM Grand acquired the property for US$75 million, including US$13 million of assumed debt. It was renamed as the MGM Grand Darwin.

=== SkyCity Darwin (2004–2019) ===
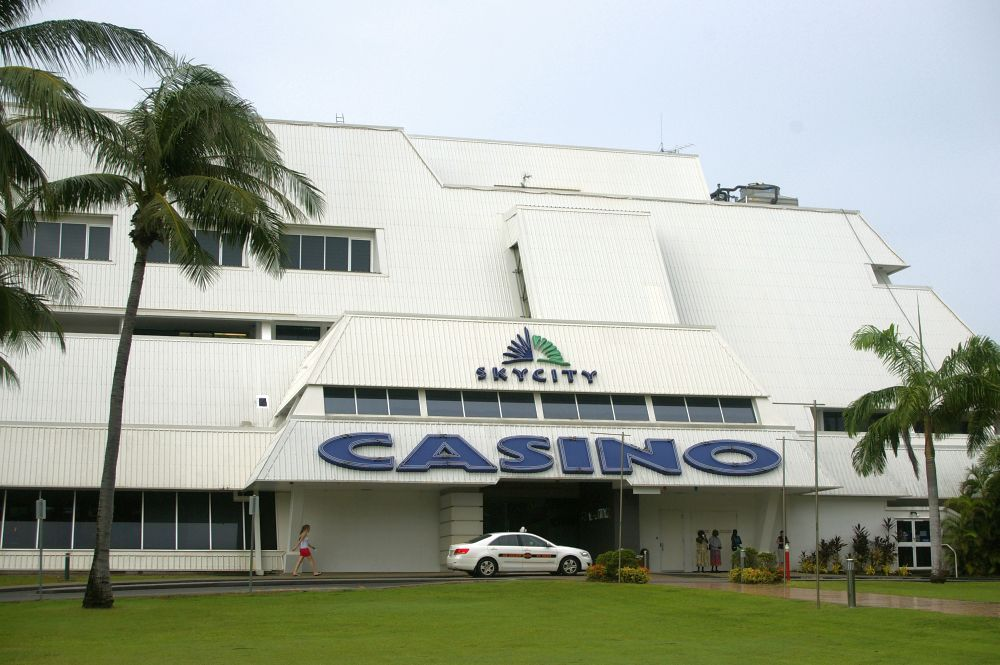
SkyCity in 2008

The SkyCity Entertainment Group purchased the hotel in 2004 for $195 million and took ownership on 23 July 2004.

=== Mindil Beach Casino & Resort (2019–present) ===
Skycity sold the hotel to American company Delaware North in April 2019 for $188 million. Delaware North changed the property's name to Mindil Beach Casino & Resort to reflect one of its original names and its modern resort facilities.
