= Louis Jacobs (businessman) =

American businessman

Personal details
- Born: Louis Melvin Jacobs; April 6, 1900 Manhattan, New York City, U.S.
- Died: August 8, 1968 (aged 68) Eggertsville, New York, U.S.
- Children: 2
- Occupation: Founder of Delaware North
- Known for: Founder of Delaware North, owner of the Cincinnati Royals

Louis Melvin Jacobs (April 6, 1900 - August 8, 1968), was an American businessman and sports team owner. Notable for starting the SportService empire that ended up becoming Delaware North. He also was an owner of the Cincinnati Royals of the National Basketball League, as well as the Buffalo Bisons and the Providence Reds of the American Hockey League and was an operating manager of the Buffalo Memorial Auditorium.

== Life ==
Jacobs was born to Polish-Jewish immigrants Moisha "Max" Jacobs, and Anna Blachmann in New York City, in 1900. Before the move to America, the original surname of his family's paternal side was Yakobovitch. He had two brothers, Marvin and Charles Jacobs who founded Jacobs Brothers together in 1915 when Louis was 15 years old. Its name was changed first to Emprise Corp. and then Sportsystems Inc. before adopting its current one in 1980.

Jacobs Brothers initially operated theater concessions. When the establishments closed down in the hot summer months, the three men turned their attention to ballparks, the first being Offermann Stadium in Buffalo, New York, and the creation of the sports concession industry. In 1919, the brothers got their break when they started to sell concessions for the Baltimore Orioles of the International League. In 1926, Jacobs Brothers was renamed "Sportservice". Sportservice is Delaware North's largest operating company. In 1927, the company entered into its first major-league deal by signing an agreement with the Detroit Tigers to handle food service at Navin Field.

In 1939, the Jacobs brothers expanded their business, acquiring a racetrack, marking the beginning of Delaware North Companies Gaming & Entertainment. In 1941, the company entered the airport arena with a contract to provide food service in Washington National Airport. In 1952, his brothers Marvin and Charles sold the remaining shares of the company to retire, leaving Louis as the sole owner of Sportservice. In 1960, the company was awarded the contract to operate the concessions at the 1960 Summer Olympics in Rome, Italy. Louis died at his desk on August 8, 1968; after his death, his sons Max, Jeremy Jacobs, and Lawrence, took over sole control of Sportservice.

== Sports teams ownership ==
Louis began his sports ownership in 1939 when he became a partner of the Syracuse Stars after being the concessions vendor to New York State Fair Coliseum. One by one the owners dropped out and Louis became the sole owner. In 1940 in his home town of Buffalo, the brand new Memorial Auditorium opened up and relocated the Stars to Buffalo to play as the Bisons. He later sold the team to Arthur Wirtz who owned the Chicago Black Hawks and was the farm team for a few years until the team was sold to local interests in 1956.

In 1951, Jacobs gave Connie Mack, the owner of the Philadelphia Athletics for over 50 years at that time, a no-interest loan of $250,000 to keep the Athletics from having financial difficulty. In October 1954, he helped broker the deal between the Mack and businessman Arnold Johnson who moved the team to Kansas City in 1955.

Louis purchased the Cincinnati Royals in 1963 from the estate of Thomas E. Wood. After he died, his sons Jeremy and Max Jacobs ran the team until 1972 when the brothers sold the team to a consortium of Kansas City and Omaha businessmen to rename move them to those cities where they became the Kansas City-Omaha Kings.
