= Secret Stadium Sauce =

Condiment popular in Wisconsin, U.S.

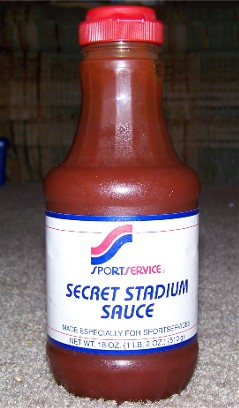

Secret Stadium Sauce is a condiment popular at Milwaukee Brewers baseball games in Milwaukee, Wisconsin. Originally developed for use at Milwaukee County Stadium, it is still served on hot dogs and brats at its replacement, American Family Field.

It is a product of Delaware North Companies Sportservice and is sold in 18-ounce bottles at grocery stores throughout Wisconsin.

== Origins ==
It was created in the early 1970s by former Delaware North Companies Sportservice President Rick Abramson, then a vendor at County Stadium, during a game when he ran short of other condiments.

We were sort of running out of ketchup and mustard, and we needed a condiment. I took barbecue sauce, a little ketchup and mustard and smoked syrup and other ingredients and came up with secret stadium sauce. We said, 'We don't have [ketchup and mustard], but we have secret stadium sauce.'

— Rick Abramson

The sauce gained popularity in the 1980s when baseball broadcaster Bob Costas expressed his love for the sauce on bratwurst at Brewer games and mentioned how he and fellow broadcaster Tony Kubek traded broadcasting duties during games so they could eat brats with the sauce during the broadcasts.

In addition to being used as a condiment, the bottle's label also includes a recipe for consumers to use the sauce as a marinade.

The flavor has inspired comparisons, from "a combination of barbecue sauce and sauerkraut juice" to "a mix of clam juice and sweetened tomato sauce". Travel Channel personality Adam Richman has described the taste as a "mix between chili sauce, cocktail sauce, barbecue sauce, and ketchup."
