= NOCO Energy Corporation =

Energy company

- Company type: Private
- Industry: Oil and gas
- Founded: 1933; 93 years ago
- Headquarters: Tonawanda, New York
- Number of locations: 30+
- Areas served: Western New York
- Products: Petroleum; Natural gas; Motor fuels; Aviation fuels; Petrochemicals
- Owner: Jim Newman (President)
- Website: noco.com

NOCO Energy Corporation is a family-owned and operated corporation based in Tonawanda, New York (a suburb of Buffalo). The company specializes in gasoline, commercial fuels, industrial lubricants, bio-products, home energy fuel, and heating and cooling systems.

Until 2019, NOCO operated 39 gas stations in Western New York, under the NOCO Express banner. They exited out of the convenience store business and sold 33 of them to Marathon Petroleum Corp. under the Speedway (store) banner. The other 6 were leased to private owners under their own banners.

== History ==
The company was founded in 1933 by Reginald B. Newman; it was incorporated as R.B. Newman Fuel Company on January 12, 1948. Donald F. Newman and Reginald B. Newman II, his sons, joined the company in 1954 and 1960, respectively. With the sons there, the company acquired a new terminal facility and expanded the product lines. The company's first gas station was opened in 1964.

=== NOCO Energy Corporation opens first stores in the City of Buffalo ===
In March 2014; NOCO bought out a privately owned gas station at Elmwood and Forest. In July, NOCO announced its takeover of another privately owned gas station on Lexington and Elmwood, as well as the Tim Hortons at that location. These being the first two NOCO owned stores in the city proper, NOCO is expected to take over more privately owned gas stations if these two locations do well.
