= Solar Liberty =

American solar panel company

Solar Liberty Energy Systems, Inc.
- Type: Private company
- Industry: Solar panel energy systems
- Founded: 2003
- Founder: Adam Rizzo and Nathan Rizzo
- Headquarters: Williamsville, NY, Buffalo, New York, United states
- Website: solarliberty.com

Solar Liberty is an American company that installs, sells and leases solar panel energy systems, known as photovoltaic (PV) systems, for homes, businesses, schools, universities, municipalities, non-profits, and other facilities and properties.

== History ==
Solar Liberty was founded in 2003 in Buffalo, New York, by brothers Adam Rizzo and Nathan Rizzo. Solar Liberty was named #1 Largest Solar Installer in New York State in 2018 (http://www.solarliberty.com/news/335-solar-liberty-recognized-as-top-solar-contractor-in-new-york.html). In 2008 it was ranked number 92 by Inc. magazine in its annual list of fastest growing private companies in the U.S. In 2012, it was ranked the number 6 fastest-growing private company in Western New York by the Business First publication.

The company headquarters is in Buffalo, New York—with offices in Rochester, Albany, Corning, Syracuse, Binghamton, and Plattsburgh (all in New York).

== Installations ==
Solar Liberty is currently the #1 Largest Solar Installer in New York State. Installations are predominantly located in Western, Central New York State, New York City area and Northern Pennsylvania. Notable installations include, but are not limited to: Buffalo City Mission (48 kW, Donated in 2010), University at Buffalo Interactive 'Solar Strand' (2014), Cummins Engines (2013), Rochester Institute of Technology (RIT, 2 MW, 2014), Life Storage (formerly Uncle Bobs Storage, 27 locations, 2015), Town of Holland (2017), City of Rochester (Landfill, 2017), Monroe County (2017), and St. John's Annex Cemetery in Long Island (10 MW, Acquired by PSEG Solar Source, 2017) which is the 'Second-Largest Solar System in New York State). at the University at Buffalo in Amherst, NY. It is a 750-kilowatt, 3,200 panel photovoltaic array on the university's north campus.

== Solar Liberty Foundation ==
The Solar Liberty Foundation provides funding for renewable energy projects in developing nations. Completed projects include a health clinic, school and orphanage in Haiti, solar cookers in Kenya, and more solar donations to Liberia and Tanzania. During Fall 2017, a group of Solar Liberty volunteers traveled to Africa to provide solar energy to an all-girls school in Kitenga which is in Tanzania, Africa. This was the first time in history Kitenga has seen electricity. The Solar Liberty Foundation will continue to provide solar energy to underdeveloped communities throughout the world.

== See also ==
- Solar power
- Efficient energy use
