= Delaware North Building =

Building in Buffalo, New York, United States

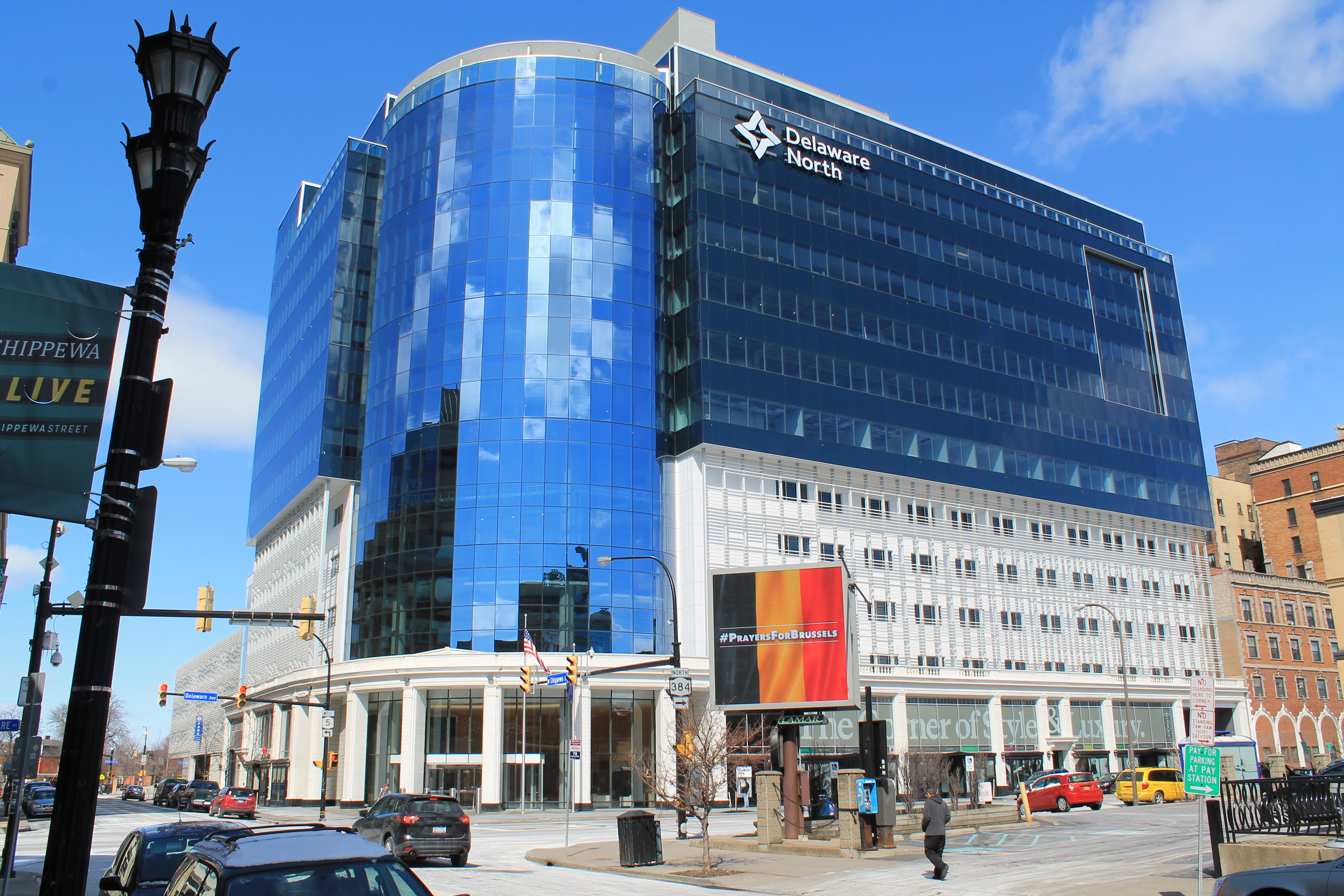
- April 2016 photo

General information
- Status: Completed
- Type: Office, commercial, hotel
- Architectural style: Postmodern architecture
- Location: 250 Delaware Avenue, Buffalo, New York, United States
- Coordinates: 42.891045°N 78.876980°W
- Construction started: January, 2014
- Topped-out: October 10, 2014
- Estimated completion: November 2015
- Cost: US$ 117 million
- Owner: Uniland Development co.

Height
- Architectural: 53 m (174 ft)
- Roof: 59.1 m (194 ft)

Technical details
- Floor count: 12
- Floor area: 332,000 sq ft (30,800 m^{2})

Design and construction
- Architecture firm: Diamond Schmitt Architects
- Developer: Uniland Development co.

Other information
- Number of rooms: Hotel: 116 rooms
- Parking: 593 spaces

Website
- Official website

The Delaware North Building is a mixed-use development in Buffalo, New York. The 12-story, 330,000-square-foot mixed-use building features Class A office space, a 120-room Westin hotel, ground level retail, a 7,000-square-foot outdoor courtyard, and an adjacent structured parking ramp. Delaware North's World Headquarters anchors the building.

== Construction ==
The new building replaces the two-story Delaware Court building (1917–2014) at the northwest corner of Delaware Avenue and Chippewa Street and occupies a 1.95-acre site. The new building replicates the iconic curved façade of the old, using terracotta features of the original structure. The building features 193,000 sq ft of class A office space on the sixth through 12th floors, a 116-room hotel occupying 104,000 sq ft, 18,000 sq ft of retail space, and indoor parking for 593 vehicles in a five-level attached parking ramp. The building's 2,600-square-foot lobby features the largest living green wall in Western New York, a 22 ft × 21 ft expanse of plants providing beauty, improving indoor air quality, and reducing energy use. In 2019, the building received a LEED Silver certification from the U.S. Green Building Council.

== Operations ==
The Delaware North Building serves as headquarters for namesake company Delaware North, which also operates a 116-room Westin hotel and Patina 250 restaurant within the building. Other tenants include KeyBank offices and retail branch, UBS Financial Services, the Department of Homeland Security, the Cullen Foundation, and Osteopathic Wellness Medicine.

== Gallery ==
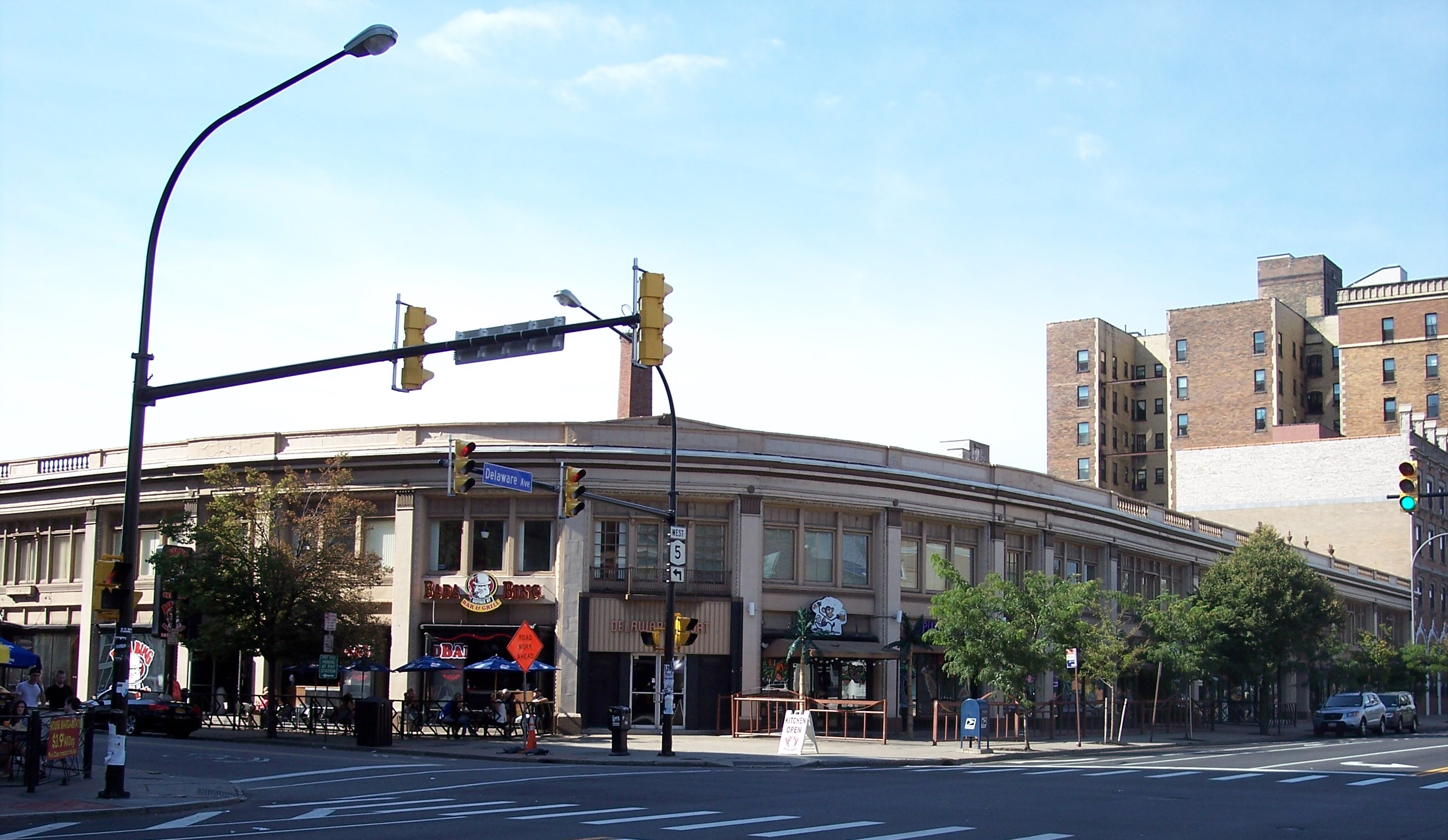
Previous building Delaware court building (2013 photo)

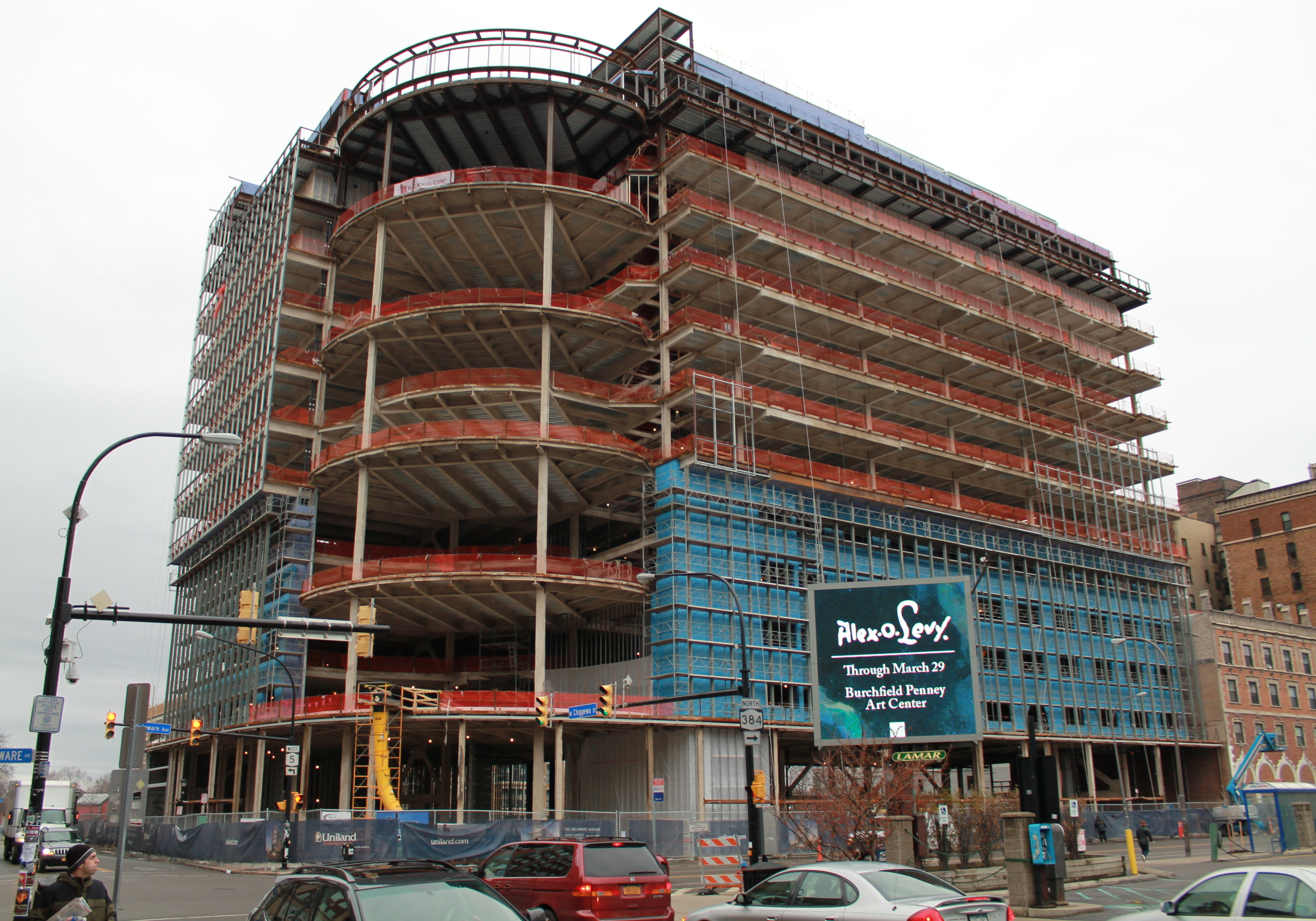
Under construction (2014)

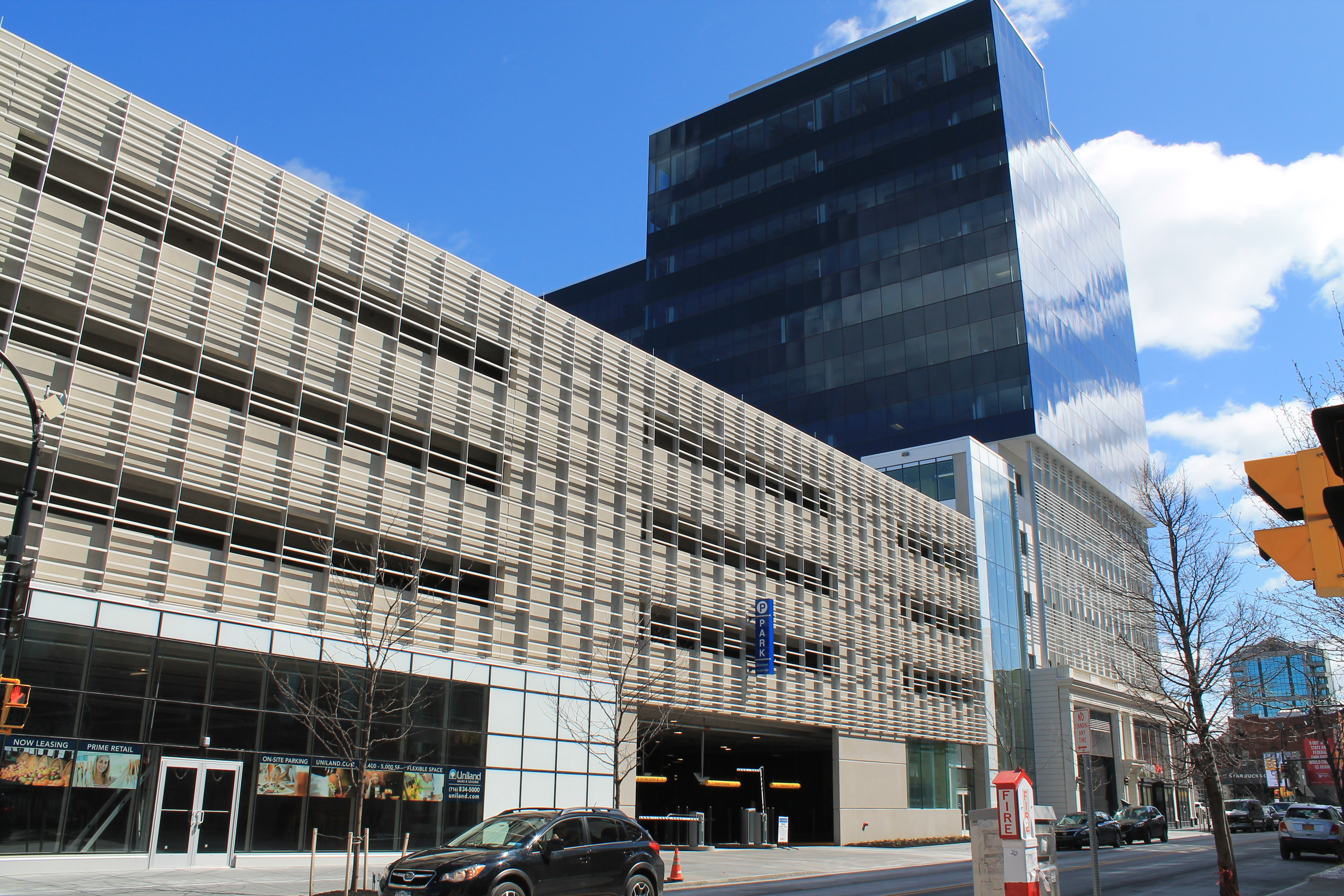
Rear of building

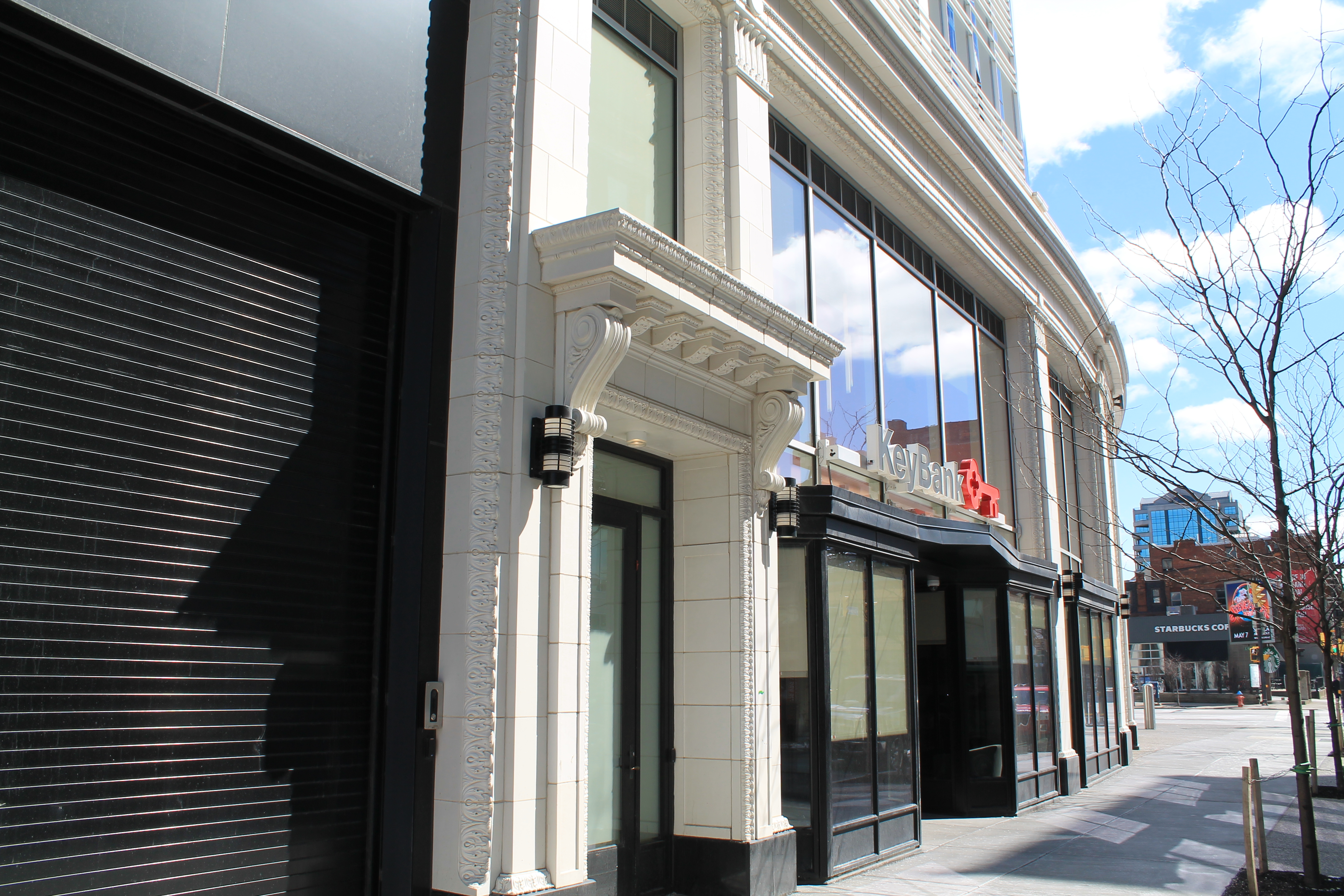
Terracotta of 250 Delaware Ave

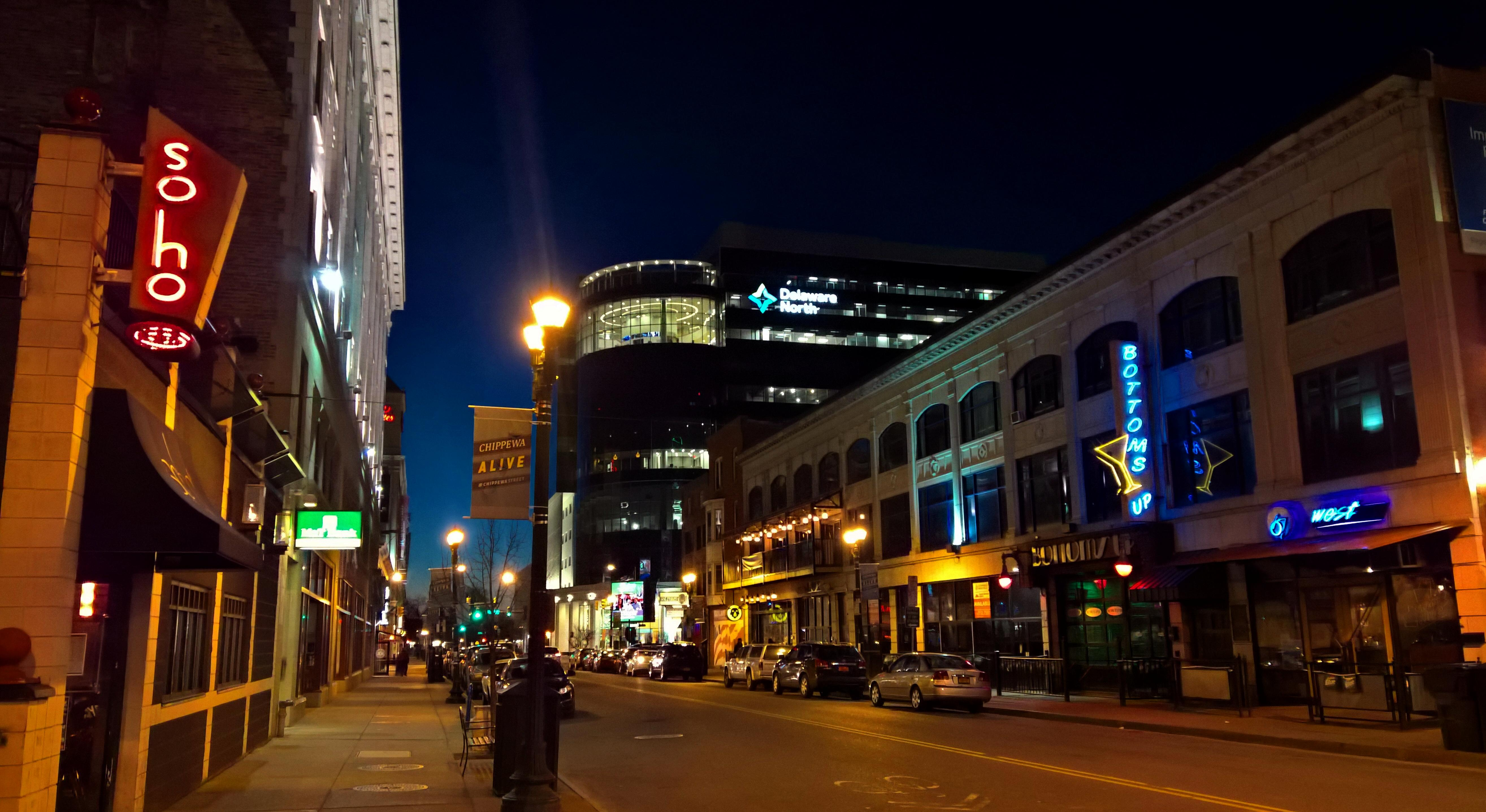
Night view from Chippewa St. (March 2016)

== See also ==
- LECOM Harborcenter
- The Avant
- List of tallest buildings in Buffalo, New York
