= Empire Genomics =

American genetic diagnostics company

- Company type: Subsidiary
- Industry: Cancer diagnostics
- Founded: 2006
- Headquarters: Buffalo, United States
- Parent: Biocare Medical
- Website: https://empiregenomics.com/

Empire Genomics, a cancer molecular diagnostics company, offers genetic tests for over 200 health conditions. It is headquartered in Buffalo, New York. The company was acquired in 2022 by Biocare Medical.

== History ==
Dr. Norma J. Nowak founded the company in 2006, originating from a project at Roswell Park Comprehensive Cancer Center in Buffalo, New York. The firm's headquarters is located in Buffalo at the Buffalo Niagara Medical Campus.

In 2012, the company received a $400,000 grant from the Empire State Development Corporation.

On February 19, 2019, the company announced the appointments of Andy Watson as CEO and Anthony Scarpello to CCO, and the opening of its new headquarters in Williamsville, NY.

In November 2022, Empire Genomics was acquired by Biocare Medical, a company specializing in automated IHC and FISH instrumentation and reagents.

== Products ==
The company develops non-invasive tests that focus around health concerns such as cancer, autism and Down syndrome. In 2012, Empire Genomics released a test for multiple myeloma and opened a new laboratory to focus on the test.
