= Museum of Disability History =

Museum in Albertson, New York, US

Coordinates: 42.962058°N 78.807940°W

The Museum of Disability History is a museum related to the history of people with disabilities. The museum is located at the Viscardi Center on Long Island.

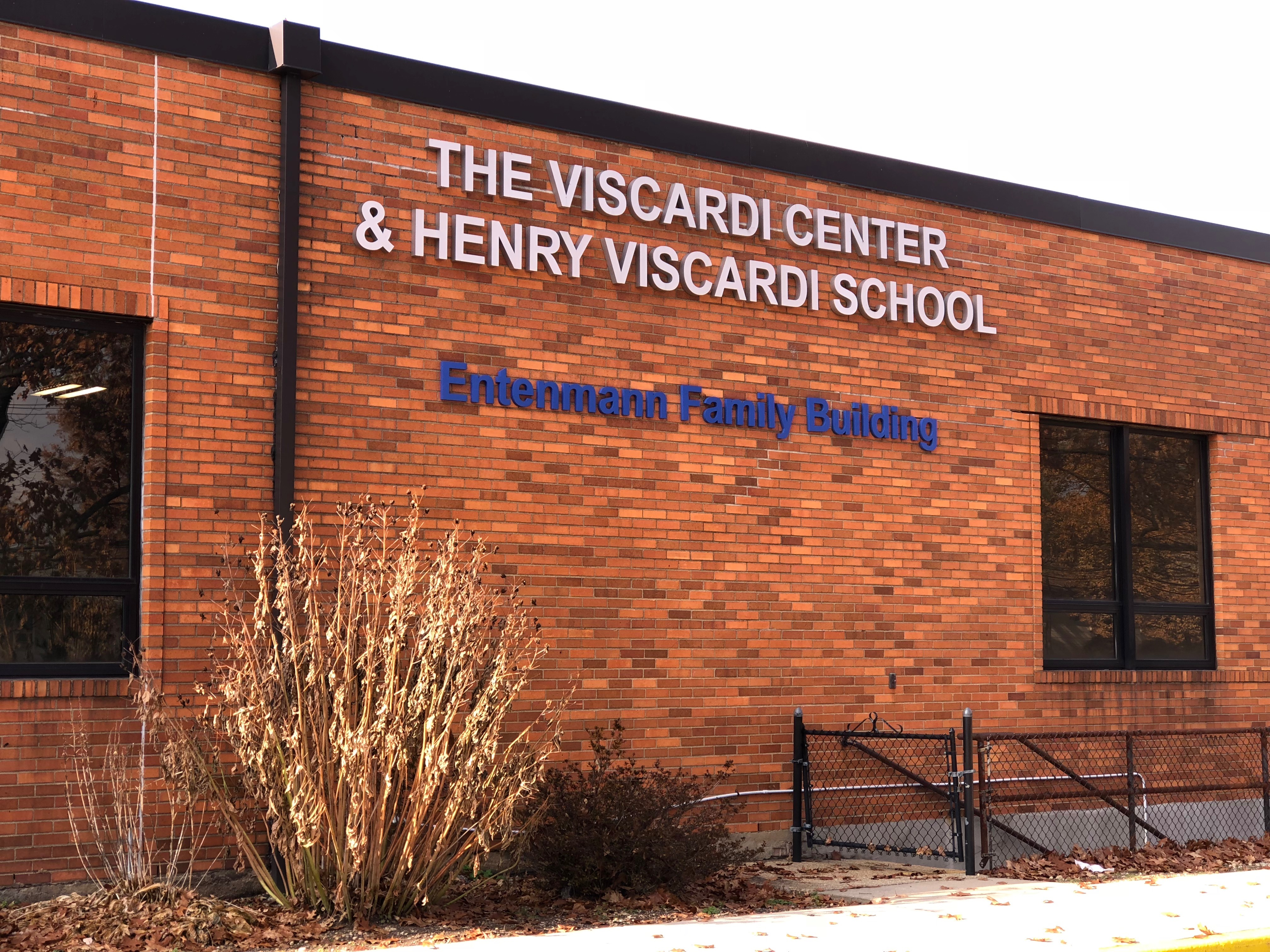
The Viscardi Center now houses the Museum of Disability History

Its current location opened its doors to the public on February 17, 2026. The museum was originally titled the Museum of disABILITY History, and was located in Buffalo, New York.

It is the only "brick-and-mortar" museum in the United States dedicated exclusively to preserving the history of people with disabilities.

== History of the museum ==
People Inc. first organized the idea for the Museum of Disability History in 1998 after James Boles, Ed.D. President and CEO of People Inc. discovered there was no museum to send students to learn about the history of people with disabilities. On December 4, 2020, during the COVID-19 pandemic, the museum announced its permanent closure due to the "lack of adequate dedicated funding."

The Buffalo museum opened in 1998 and closed in December 2020, but it continued operating as of 2024 as a virtual museum, before donating its collections to the Viscardi Center.

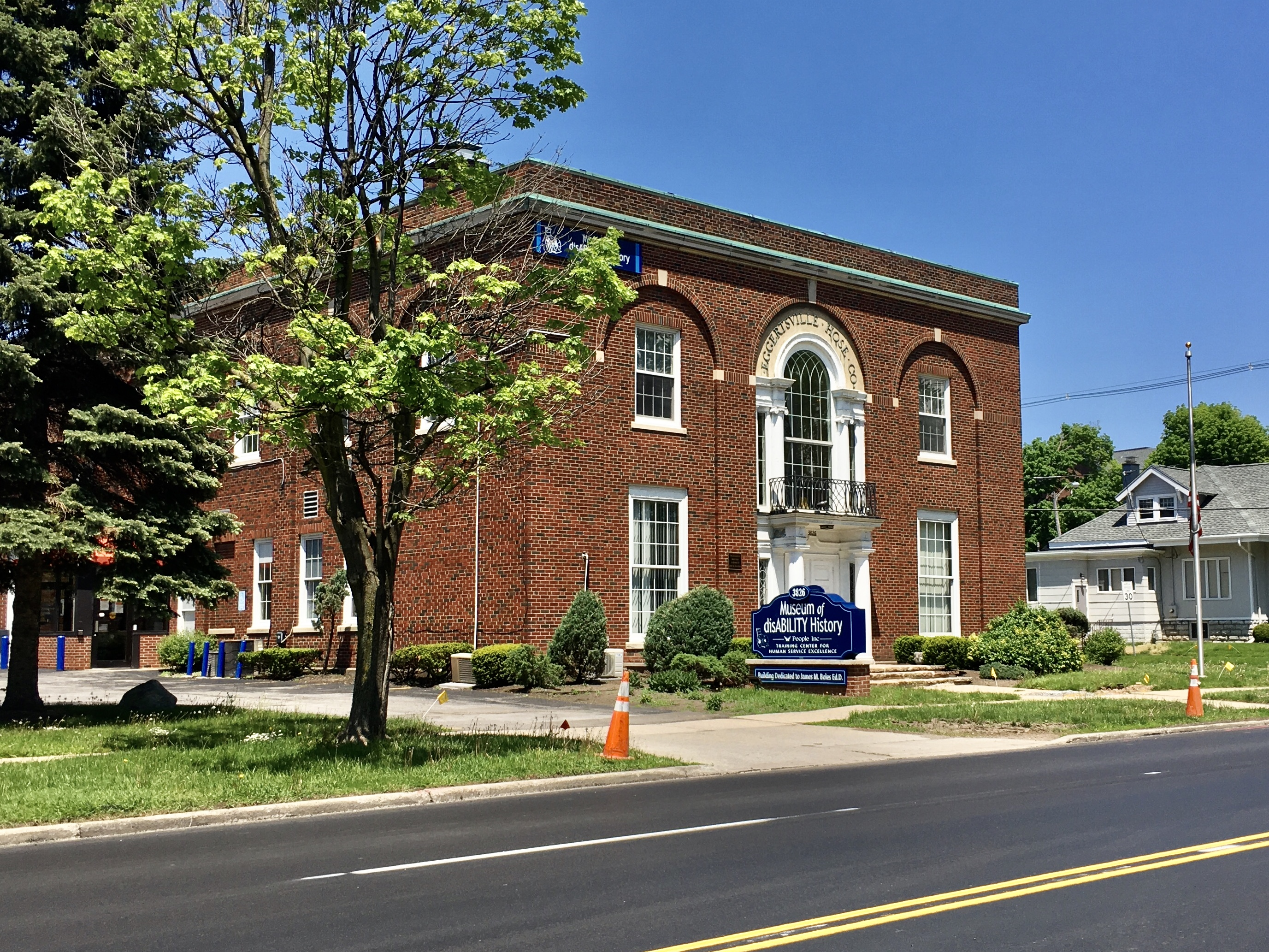
Museum of disABILITY History, at its former location in Buffalo, NY.

== Collections ==
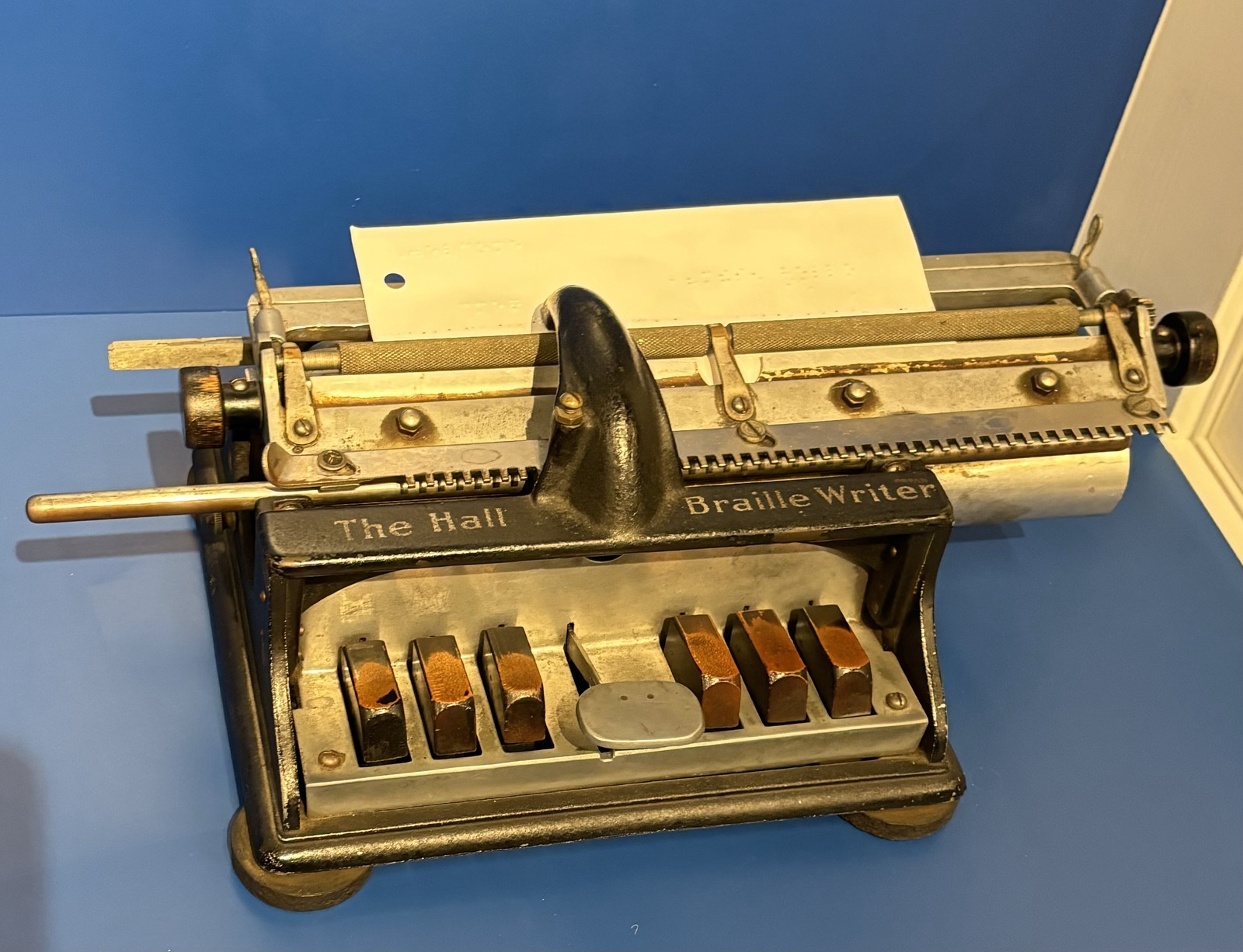
A Hall Braille-Writer, currently housed at the Viscardi Center. The Hall Braille-Writer, invented by Frank W. Hall, was the first widely available mechanical Braille-Writer.

The museum has features a permanent exhibit and several rotating exhibits, Users can access a searchable database of the museum's holdings, with over 12,000 digitized items.

They hold rare books, historic artifacts, mobility equipment utilized by people with disabilities, and archival materials, the earliest dating to 1750. Included in the museum's collection was a 1963 Greaves Thundersley Invacar, the only known Invacar in North America.

== Exhibits ==
The Museum of Disability History offers many on-site and traveling exhibitions.
