= People Inc. (Western New York) =

Non-profit organization in Western New York

People Incorporated is a non-profit organization in Western New York that provides a variety of services to seniors, families and individuals with developmental disabilities including residential, employment, community outreach, health care, and recreation programs.

== History ==
The organization was established in Erie County in 1970 under the name of Services to the Mentally Retarded in Erie County, when a small group of parents and professionals joined to address the needs of people with intellectual disability. The agency expanded its mission to include a wider variety of services to address the needs of people with developmental disabilities and disabling conditions, as well as the general public. Over the years, the agency has grown greatly in numbers of population served, spectrum of services, geographic locations, and number of sites. In 1998, People Incorporated founded The Museum of disABILITY History, the first-ever museum dedicated to people with disabilities and their history.
