= Charlie Jacobs =

American businessman (born 1971)

- Born: Charles Marvin Jacobs; September 16, 1971 (age 55); Buffalo, New York, US
- Education: Boston College
- Occupations: CEO of Delaware North's Boston Holdings, including the Boston Bruins
- Children: 3

Charles Marvin Jacobs (born September 16, 1971) is the co-Chief Executive Officer of Delaware North, a role he shares with his brothers, Jerry and Lou. Jacobs oversees Delaware North's interests in Boston, and is Chief Executive Officer and Governor for the Boston Bruins. He is the Founder and Chairman of the Boston Bruins Foundation, having raised more than $62 million for charitable organizations throughout New England since 2003.

== Early life and education ==
Jacobs is the son of Margaret and Jeremy Jacobs and is the youngest of their six children. His father is the chairman of the NHL Board of Governors.

Jacobs attended Boston College and graduated with a Bachelor of Arts in 1994. After graduation, he moved to California, working briefly with the Los Angeles Kings before joining Total Media Group as CEO and president.

Throughout his career, Jacobs has achieved many accolades including being inducted into Sports Business Journal’s Forty Under 40 Class of 2009. Under his guidance, the Bruins were named the Sport Business Journal’s 2012 Sports Team of the Year based on the criteria of “excellence, growth, creativity, innovation, sound planning, implementation and outcomes.”

Jacobs has three adult children and resides in Boston with his wife Liz Jacobs and their dog Berry.

== Career ==
=== Delaware North ===
As CEO for Delaware North, Charlie provides leadership to Delaware North and its seven operating subsidiaries, which include global industry leaders in food and retail operations at airports and sports venues, sports facility ownership and management, operations of parks and major tourist attractions, hotel ownership and management, gaming operations and fine dining and catering.

This also includes leading Boston’s TD Garden, The Hub on Causeway and the company’s ownership share in New England Sports Network (NESN).

=== Boston Bruins ===
Jacobs is CEO of the Boston Bruins. Since 2000, he has been an Alternate Governor to the NHL Board of Governors.

Following the Bruins' Stanley Cup win in 2011, the team's players and management, including Jacobs, were invited to the White House to commemorate their victory.

In partnership with Fenway Sports Group, Jacobs has been instrumental in the growth of NESN, the regional sports cable and satellite television network where he was on the board for 22 years. Most notably, he played a big role in NESN becoming the first U.S. regional sports network to offer its content on a direct-to-consumer basis, successfully rolling out NESN 360 to fans in a cord-cutting era. Under Jacob’s leadership, the Boston Bruins have created and produced multiple shows exclusively for NESN, including four-time New England Emmy-winning show Behind the B and New England Emmy-winning kids program Bruins Academy.

In June 2013, it was revealed that Jacobs gave season tickets for life to Marge Bishop, a seventy-seven-year-old fan who had had season tickets since the time of the Nixon administration but was unable to renew her tickets in 2006 due to price increases. In 2004, Jacobs personally invited Bishop to join the organization's Season Ticket Advisory Board when she was first thinking about not renewing her tickets. She kept the tickets for two more seasons, before eventually deciding she no longer could. At this point, Jacobs gave her a backstage tour of the TD Garden arena and concluded the experience by providing her with a VIP pass good for any Bruins game.

=== Board memberships and charity ===
Jacobs is the Founder and Chairman of the Boston Bruins Foundation, whose mission is it assist charitable organizations that demonstrate a commitment to enhancing the quality of life for children and families throughout New England. Since its inception in 2003, the Boston Bruins Foundation has raised more than $62 million.

Jacobs is active in numerous local organizations, including The Massachusetts Business Roundtable, Boston College Chief Executives Club and The Sports Museum, where he is on the board.

== Equestrianism ==
Jacobs is also an avid equestrian, having been on the United States Equestrian Team. His family shares his love for horses and show jumping.

Jacobs won national and international events.

Internationally, Jacobs traveled to the CSIO-W Buenos Aires event with the United States Show Jumping Team in both 2011 and 2012, competing in the FEI Nations Cup. In 2011, the team finished fifth overall and Jacobs won three events, including the Ericsson Grand Prix and the Nissan International Speed Derby. In 2012, the team won first prize in the Nations Cup, beating out Canada and Argentina (who tied for second). Jacobs repeated his victory in the International Speed Derby, and also finished fifth in the World Cup Qualifying Grand Prix.

Jacobs completed the 2011 Show Jumping Hall of Fame Jumper Classic Series in first place in the East Conference's Amateur-Owner Division. He finished the series with 645 points.

Jacobs won the 2013 $50,000 Holiday & Horses Wellington Qualifier in Wellington, Florida, receiving the $50,000 grand prize. Jacobs competed on his horse Flaming Star. The event was held from November 30 to December 1, 2013.

Jacobs has competed on numerous Nations Cup Teams for USA Equestrian. He is a four-time World Cup Veteran, having placed in the top 20 riders in the World Cup Final two times.
