= 2023 Erie County, New York Executive election =

2023 Erie County Executive election
- November 7, 2023
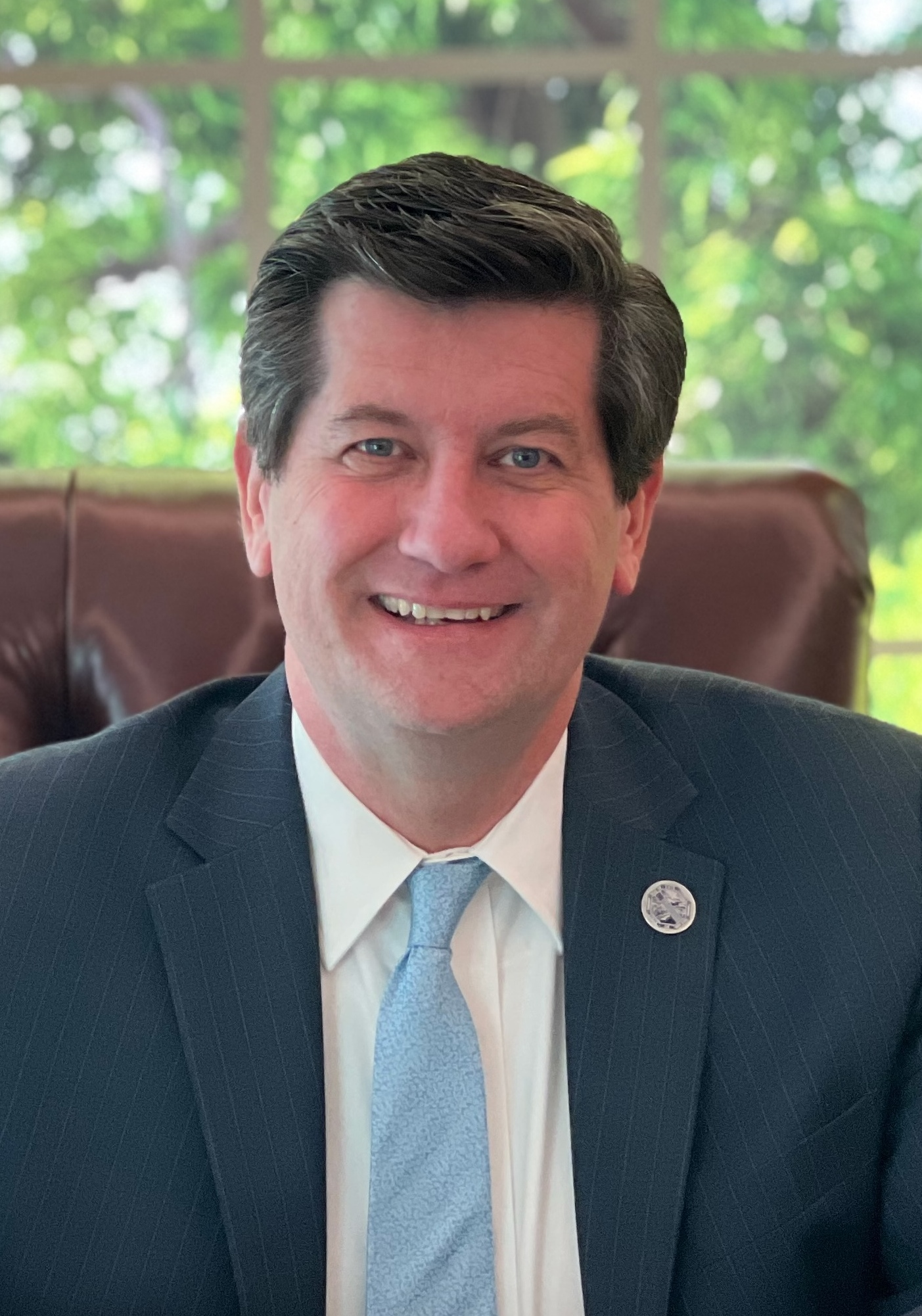

Nominee	Mark Poloncarz	Chrissy Casilio
Party	Democratic	Republican
Alliance	Working Families	Conservative
Popular vote	118,308	81,072
Percentage	58.64%	40.18%
County Executive before election
Mark Poloncarz
Democratic
Elected County Executive
Mark Poloncarz
Democratic

The 2023 Erie County, New York Executive election took place on November 7, 2023, to select the County Executive of Erie County, New York. Incumbent Democratic County Executive Mark Poloncarz ran for re-election to a fourth term, which he said would be his last. He was challenged by businesswoman Chrissy Casilio, the Republican nominee.

During the campaign, Poloncarz weathered controversy when a woman he was dating alleged that he physically restrained her prior to the end of their relationship, though charges were ultimately not filed, and for awarding a contract to another woman he was dating. Casilio herself faced scandal when she was caught on Twitter spreading false conspiracy theories surrounding the 2020 U.S. Presidential Election and Damar Hamlin's on-field cardiac arrest.

Poloncarz easily defeated Casilio to win his fourth term in a landslide, receiving 59 percent of the vote.

== Democratic nomination ==
Mark Poloncarz announced that he would seek a record fourth term as County Executive, and he initially faced a challenge from former Grand Island Town Supervisor Nate McMurray, who narrowly lost a 2018 congressional campaign to Republican Congressman Chris Collins. McMurray criticized Poloncarz's plans to seek a fourth term, arguing that "executives are not supposed to have a lifetime position" and that he would campaign against the "status quo."

McMurray attracted criticism for telling Poloncarz that "Eric County sucks" at a meeting of the Erie County Democratic Party, which county party chairman Jeremy Zellner called "appalling." McMurray followed up on his remarks, noting, "I love Erie County. That's why I was [at the meeting] in the first place. But its current state is not good. And that's because of Mark [Poloncarz]." McMurray dropped out of the race shortly thereafter, saying that he couldn't "beat Mark in this system."

Following McMurray's withdrawal from the race, Poloncarz won the Democratic nomination unopposed.

== Republican nomination ==
Three candidates sought the nomination of the Republican Party: Erie County Clerk Mickey Kearns, a Democrat; Boston Town Supervisor Jason Keding; and businesswoman Chrissy Casilio, the daughter of Clarence Town Supervisor Patrick Casilio. Kearns, who faced some opposition over his refusal to formally switch parties, ultimately dropped out of the race, citing family considerations. Casilio was ultimately selected as the nominee.

== General election ==
=== Candidates ===
- Mark Poloncarz, Incumbent County Executive (Democratic, Working Families)
- Chrissy Casilio, businesswoman (Republican, Conservative)
- Duane J. Whitmer, (Libertarian)

=== Results ===
2023 Erie County Executive election
Party	Candidate	Votes	%
Democratic	Mark Poloncarz	107,879	53.47%
Working Families	Mark Poloncarz	10,429	5.17%
Total	Mark Poloncarz (inc.)	118,308	58.64%
Republican	Chrissy Casilio	58,672	29.08%
Conservative	Chrissy Casilio	22,400	11.10%
Total	Chrissy Casilio	81,072	40.18%
Libertarian	Duane J. Whitmer	2,323	1.15%
Write-in		47	0.02%
Total votes		201,750	100.00%
Democratic hold			
