= 2020 New York's 27th congressional district special election =

- June 23, 2020

New York's 27th congressional district
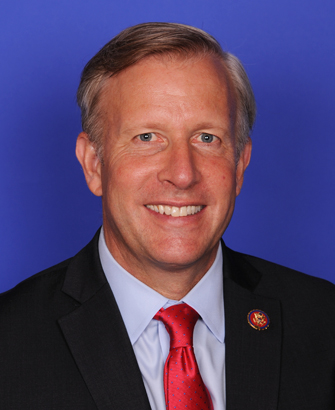

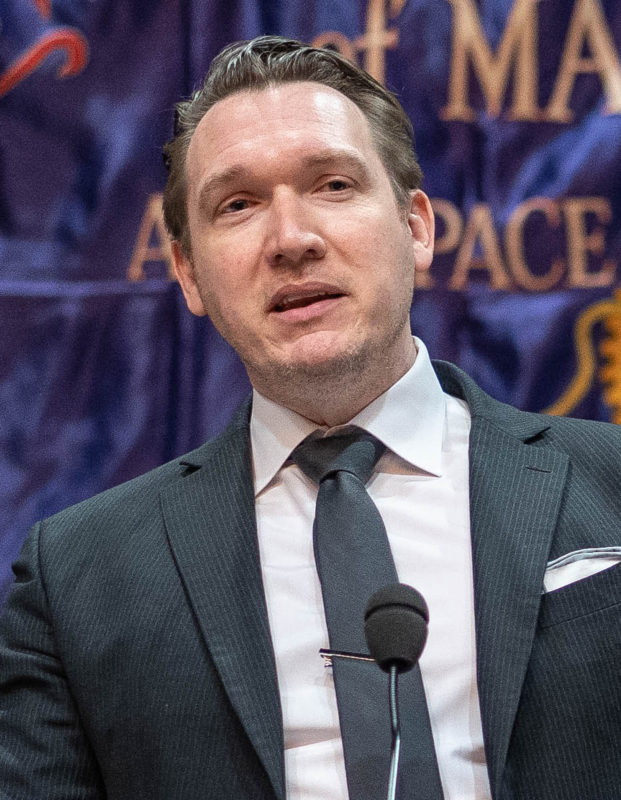
Nominee	Chris Jacobs	Nate McMurray
Party	Republican	Democratic
Alliance	Independence	Working Families
Popular vote	81,085	72,998
Percentage	51.8%	46.6%
- County results Jacobs: 50–60% 60–70% McMurray: 50–60%
U.S. Representative before election
Chris Collins
Republican
Elected U.S. Representative
Chris Jacobs
Republican

A special election was held to fill the remainder of the term in the United States House of Representatives for New York's 27th congressional district in the 116th United States Congress. Incumbent Republican Representative Chris Collins resigned from the House effective October 1, 2019, following his guilty plea to federal insider trading charges. The election was originally scheduled for April 28, 2020, but was postponed until June 23, 2020, due to the COVID-19 pandemic.

== Candidates ==
Former Grand Island town supervisor and 2018 Democratic congressional nominee Nathan D. McMurray was expected to be the nominee after being endorsed by the Erie County Democratic Committee. Fellow Democrat Melodie Baker announced her interest in seeking the nomination, but quickly withdrew when her campaign failed to gain interest. McMurray was formally nominated on February 13, 2020.

On January 25, 2020, the Republican chairs of the eight counties that make up the 27th congressional district met in Wyoming County and voted to endorse state senator Chris Jacobs for the special election.

On February 1, 2020, the Conservative Party of New York State announced that it would not endorse a candidate in the anticipated special election and would instead leave its party line blank. The Party's preferred candidate was Beth Parlato.

Accountant Duane Whitmer was endorsed by the Libertarian Party.

=== Republican Party ===
==== Endorsee ====
- Chris Jacobs, state senator for New York's 60th State Senate district

==== Withdrawn ====
- Rob Ortt, state senator for New York's 62nd State Senate district
- Frank C. Smierciak II, health care firm employee (running for New York State Assembly instead)

==== Declined to run ====
- David Bellavia, U.S. Army veteran and Medal of Honor recipient
- Steve Hawley, state assemblyman for New York's 139th State Assembly district

==== Endorsements ====
Chris Jacobs

Executive officials

- Donald Trump, 45th president of the United States

=== Democratic Party ===
==== Endorsee ====
- Nate McMurray, former Grand Island supervisor and nominee for New York's 27th congressional district in 2018

==== Withdrawn ====
- Melodie Baker, former director of education for the United Way of Buffalo and small business owner

==== Declined to run ====
- Kathy Hochul, Lieutenant Governor of New York and former U.S. Representative for New York's 26th congressional district (2011–2013)

=== Libertarian Party ===
==== Endorsee ====
- Duane Whitmer, Erie County Libertarian Party chairman

=== Green Party ===
==== Endorsee ====
- Mike Gamms, Comedian and Activist

== General election ==
=== Debate ===
McMurray and Jacobs participated in a debate on June 9, in which McMurray criticized Jacobs for not standing up to Trump's actions, in particular, Trump's claim that a 75-year-old man injured by police in Buffalo could be an "ANTIFA provocateur". McMurray also accused Jacobs of trying to buy the position, lying, and not supporting the Black Lives Matter movement. He emphasized his continued positive impact on communities in the area, positioning himself as an alternative to former Republican representatives Chris Collins and Chris Lee, both of whom resigned due to scandals. Jacobs criticized McMurray for supporting big government and abortion, which he saw as a poor fit for the conservative values of the district.

=== Predictions ===
Source	Ranking	As of
The Cook Political Report	Safe R	April 24, 2020
Inside Elections	Safe R	April 23, 2020
Sabato's Crystal Ball	Likely R	April 23, 2020
Politico	Likely R	April 19, 2020

=== Results ===
2020 New York's 27th congressional district special election
Party	Candidate	Votes	%	±%
Republican	Chris Jacobs	74,944	47.85%	+7.65%
Independence	Chris Jacobs	6,141	3.92%	+3.22%
Total	Chris Jacobs	81,085	51.77%	+2.67%
Democratic	Nathan McMurray	68,684	43.85%	−1.15%
Working Families	Nathan McMurray	4,314	2.75%	−0.05%
Total	Nathan McMurray	72,998	46.60%	−2.20%
Libertarian	Duane Whitmer	1,500	0.96%	N/A
Green	Michael Gammariello	1,045	0.67%	N/A
Total votes		156,628	100.0%	N/A

By county

County	Chris Jacobs Republican		Nathan McMurray Democratic		All Others		Margin		Total votes
County	#	%	#	%	#	%	#	%	Total votes
Erie (part)	37,910	50.20%	36,492	48.32%	1,118	1.48%	1,418	1.88%	75,520
Genesee	6,128	60.04%	3,849	37.71%	230	2.26%	2,279	22.33%	10,207
Livingston	5,531	52.13%	4,877	45.97%	202	1.90%	654	6.16%	10,610
Monroe (part)	2,260	44.58%	2,728	53.82%	81	1.60%	-468	-9.24%	5,069
Niagara (part)	14,139	53.02%	12,126	45.48%	400	1.49%	2,193	7.57%	26,665
Ontario (part)	5,964	41.82%	8,061	56.53%	235	1.65%	-2,097	-14.71%	14,260
Orleans	4,091	64.57%	2,134	33.68%	111	1.75%	1,957	30.89%	6,336
Wyoming	5,062	63.58%	2,731	34.30%	168	2.11%	2,331	29.28%	7,961
Totals	81,085	51.77%	72,998	46.60%	2,545	1.63%	8,087	5.17%	156,628

== See also ==
- 2020 New York state elections
