= MIS416 =

Experimental drug

MIS416 is an experimental drug developed by Innate Immunotherapeutics which underwent clinical trials to treat secondary progressive multiple sclerosis. It is derived from the bacteria that causes acne and targets myeloid cells through TLR9 and NOD2. In one of its first rounds of clinical trials, the drug was shown to be "safe and well tolerated", with 80% of secondary-progressive multiple sclerosis patients exhibiting more than 30% improvement in at least one area of their MS status. However, Phase II clinical trials were unable to prove that the drug provided a benefit to patients. It is also being researched as a potential treatment for cancer.

== Development ==
MIS416 is a microparticle derived from the cytoskeleton of P. acnes, a species of bacteria present on the skin of most adults that causes acne.

MIS416 was originally developed as a vaccine adjuvant, a component of vaccines that helps to activate an immune response against the vaccine target. Bacteria-derived microparticles have several advantages over traditional adjuvants related both to their size and biological properties.

Because MIS416 is engulfed by immune cells, it is being investigated as an immunotherapy-based treatment for solid tumors.

The drug was used to treat multiple sclerosis under a compassionate use law in New Zealand before clinical trials began. It is administered as an intravenous infusion. In 2017, clinical trials in people with secondary progressive multiple sclerosis failed to meet the primary endpoint of slowed progression of the disease.

== Phase II trial and aftermath ==
On June 22, 2017, Innate Immunotherapeutics announced that clinical trials undertaken to evaluate the efficacy of MIS416 in managing secondary progressive multiple sclerosis (SPMS) had "failed to show any clinically meaningful benefit or statistical significance". As a result, the company's stock dropped by 92 percent and crashed on the Australian Securities Exchange.

US Congressman Chris Collins, a member of the company's board of directors and 17-percent stock holder, was subsequently indicted on charges of insider trading in connection with the poor clinical trial results. Collins had allegedly obtained word from the company about the results and informed his son, Cameron Collins, who immediately sold his US stock. Cameron allegedly tipped off shareholder Stephen Zarsky, who informed three others, thus preventing a total loss of $768,000 in stocks. Zarsky was indicted together with Collins and his son.
