= Secretary Daniels =

- Josephus Daniels (1862–1948), American Secretary of the Navy during World War I
- Randy Daniels (born 1950), American Secretary of State of New York from 2001 to 2005
- Jonathan Worth Daniels (April 26, 1902 - November 6, 1981), American White House Press Secretary
