= 2011 Erie County, New York Executive election =

2011 Erie County Executive election
- November 8, 2011

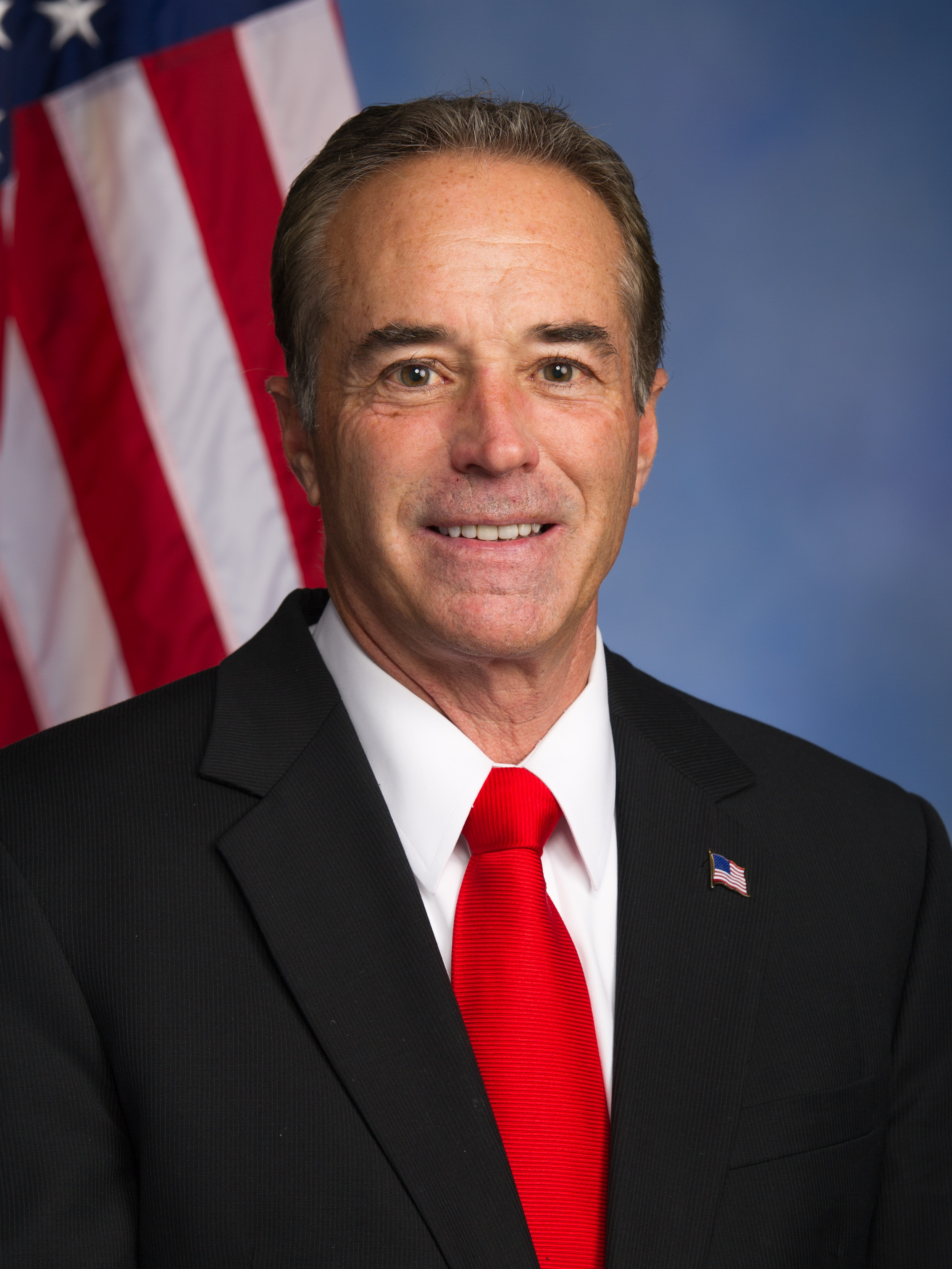
Nominee	Mark Poloncarz	Chris Collins
Party	Democratic	Republican
Alliance	Working Families Party	Parties: Independence; Conservative
Popular vote	123,053	110,050
Percentage	52.79%	47.21%
County Executive before election
Chris Collins
Republican
Elected County Executive
Mark Poloncarz
Democratic

The 2011 Erie County, New York Executive election took place on November 6, 2011, to select the County Executive of Erie County, New York. Incumbent Republican County Executive Chris Collins ran for re-election to a second term.

Collins was a controversial figure in his first term, drawing criticism for comparing State Assembly Speaker Sheldon Silver, a Jew, to the anti-Christ and Adolf Hitler, and allegedly making sexually suggestive remarks at the 2010 State of the State address to a female attendee. Though Collins considered a run for Governor in 2010, he ultimately declined to run.

In Collins's bid for a second term, he was challenged by County Controller Mark Poloncarz, the Democratic nominee. Poloncarz ultimately defeated Collins, winning 53 percent of the vote to Collins's 47 percent.

== Democratic nomination ==
Three candidates appeared likely to seek the Democratic nomination for County Executive: County Controller Mark Poloncarz, County Clerk Kathy Hochul, and State Assemblyman Dennis Gabryszak. However, following the resignation of Republican Congressman Chris Lee, a special election was scheduled in New York's 26th congressional district, and local Democrats selected Hochul as their nominee, removing from her from contention for the County Executive nomination.

Poloncarz announced that he would challenge Collins on May 7, 2011, and was endorsed by the Erie County Democratic Party on May 17, ultimately assuring him of the nomination without a primary.

== Independence Party primary ==
=== Candidates ===
- Chris Collins, incumbent County Executive
- Richard L. Woll, party activist

=== Results ===
Independence Party primary results
Party	Candidate	Votes	%
Independence	Chris Collins (inc.)	1,214	59.66%
Independence	Richard L. Woll	821	40.34%
Total votes		2,035	100.00%

== General election ==
=== Candidates ===
- Chris Collins, incumbent County Executive (Republican, Conservative, Independence)
- Mark Poloncarz, County Controller (Democratic, Working Families)

=== Results ===
2011 Erie County Executive election
Party	Candidate	Votes	%
Democratic	Mark Poloncarz	110,899	47.58%
Working Families	Mark Poloncarz	12,154	5.21%
Total	Mark Poloncarz	123,053	52.79%
Republican	Chris Collins	83,555	35.84%
Conservative	Chris Collins	17,265	7.41%
Independence	Chris Collins	9,230	3.96%
Total	Chris Collins (inc.)	110,050	47.21%
Total votes		233,103	100.00%
Democratic gain from Republican			

== Aftermath ==
Collins was seek as a possible candidate for Governor in 2014, with his defeat taking him out of contention, though he ultimately ran for Congress in 2012 and defeated Democratic Congresswoman Kathy Hochul in her bid for re-election in the 27th district.
