= 2020 United States presidential election in New York =

- November 3, 2020
- Turnout: 69.7% (▲2.4 pp)

Nominee	Joe Biden	Donald Trump
Party	Democratic	Republican
Alliance	Working Families	Conservative
Home state	Delaware	Florida
Running mate	Kamala Harris	Mike Pence
Electoral vote	29	0
Popular vote	5,244,886	3,251,997
Percentage	60.87%	37.74%

Biden
40–50%
50–60%
60–70%
70–80%
80–90%
90–100%
Trump
40–50%
50–60%
60–70%
70–80%
80–90%
90–100%
Tie/No Data
President before election
Donald Trump
Republican
Elected President
Joe Biden
Democratic

The 2020 United States presidential election in New York was held on Tuesday, November 3, 2020, as part of the 2020 United States presidential election in which all 50 states plus the District of Columbia participated. New York voters chose electors to represent them in the Electoral College via a popular vote, pitting the Republican Party's nominee, incumbent President Donald Trump, and running mate Vice President Mike Pence against Democratic Party nominee, former Vice President Joe Biden, and his running mate California Senator Kamala Harris. New York had 29 electoral votes in the Electoral College. Trump announced that Florida would be his home state for this election, rather than New York as it had been previously. This was the first presidential election in New York to allow no-excuse absentee voting.

Despite Donald Trump's longtime association with the state, New York was considered to be a state Biden would win or a safe blue state. Statewide elections in New York are dominated by New York City, the most populated city in the US and a Democratic stronghold home to around 43% of the state's population. Biden's victory came from overwhelming strength with Black and Hispanic voters, especially those from New York City, as well as strong support throughout the state, particularly in suburban areas such as Westchester and Nassau counties, from college-educated, suburban, Hispanic, Asian, and Multiracial voters.

Biden was immediately declared the winner of New York's electoral votes when polls closed on Election Day. Biden slightly outperformed Hillary Clinton's margin of victory from 4 years earlier by 0.48% and flipped 4 counties that previously voted for Trump. Biden's 5,244,886 vote total is the highest vote total for a presidential candidate in New York.

New York voted 19% more Democratic than the national average. This was the first time since 1992 that Orange, Oswego, Washington, Madison, and Warren counties voted for the losing presidential candidate, as well as the first since 1976 that a Democrat won without Cayuga, Cortland, Otsego, Seneca, Franklin, Niagara, and St. Lawrence counties, and the first since 1960 that a Democrat won without Sullivan County.

== Primary elections ==
The primary elections were originally scheduled for April 28, 2020. On March 28, New York State elections officials moved the primary date to June 23 due to concerns over the COVID-19 pandemic.

=== Canceled Republican primary ===
On March 3, 2020, the New York Republican Party became one of several state GOP parties to officially cancel their respective primaries and caucuses. Donald Trump was the only Republican candidate to submit the required number of names of his 162 total delegates, both the 94 primary ones and the alternates. Among Trump's major challengers, Bill Weld only submitted about half of his required delegates, and neither Rocky De La Fuente nor Joe Walsh sent in any names at all. With the cancellation, Trump was automatically able to send his 94 New York pledged delegates to the national convention.

=== Democratic primary ===
On April 27, 2020, New York State elections officials had decided to cancel the state's Democratic primary altogether, citing the fact that former Vice President Joe Biden was the only major candidate left in the race after all the others had suspended their campaigns, and canceling it would save the state millions of dollars from printing the extra sheet on the ballot. However, on May 5, a federal judge ruled that the Democratic primary must proceed on June 23 after a suit made by former presidential primary candidate Andrew Yang.

Among the other major candidates were entrepreneur Andrew Yang, Kirsten Gillibrand, one of New York's two current senators, and Bill de Blasio, the mayor of New York City. However, on August 29, 2019, Gillibrand dropped out of the race. Bill de Blasio as well dropped out on September 20, 2019, after failing to qualify for the fourth Democratic debate.

Results

2020 New York Democratic presidential primary
Candidate	Votes	%	Delegates
Joe Biden	1,136,679	64.62	230
Bernie Sanders (withdrawn)	285,908	16.25	44
Elizabeth Warren (withdrawn)	82,917	4.71	
Michael Bloomberg (withdrawn)	39,433	2.24	
Pete Buttigieg (withdrawn)	22,927	1.30	
Andrew Yang (withdrawn)	22,686	1.29	
Amy Klobuchar (withdrawn)	11,028	0.63	
Tulsi Gabbard (withdrawn)	9,083	0.52	
Deval Patrick (withdrawn)	3,040	0.17	
Michael Bennet (withdrawn)	2,932	0.17	
Tom Steyer (withdrawn)	2,299	0.13	
Blank ballots / Void ballots	(Note: 135,486 blank and 4,621 void ballots)140,107	7.96	
Total	1,759,039	100%	274

=== Conservative ===
The Conservative Party of New York State cross-endorsed the Republican ticket, nominating Donald Trump for president and Mike Pence for vice president.

=== Working Families ===
The Working Families Party cross-endorsed the Democratic ticket, nominating Joe Biden for president and Kamala Harris for vice president. Several prominent Democrats, including Senators Bernie Sanders, Elizabeth Warren and Kirsten Gillibrand, U.S. Representative Alexandria Ocasio-Cortez, and Senate Minority Leader Chuck Schumer encouraged voting for Biden and Harris on the WFP line, in order for the party to keep ballot access.

=== Green ===
The Green Party of New York nominated the national Green Party ticket; Howie Hawkins for president and Angela Nicole Walker for vice president.

=== Libertarian primary ===
2020 New York Libertarian presidential primary
- April 28, 2020
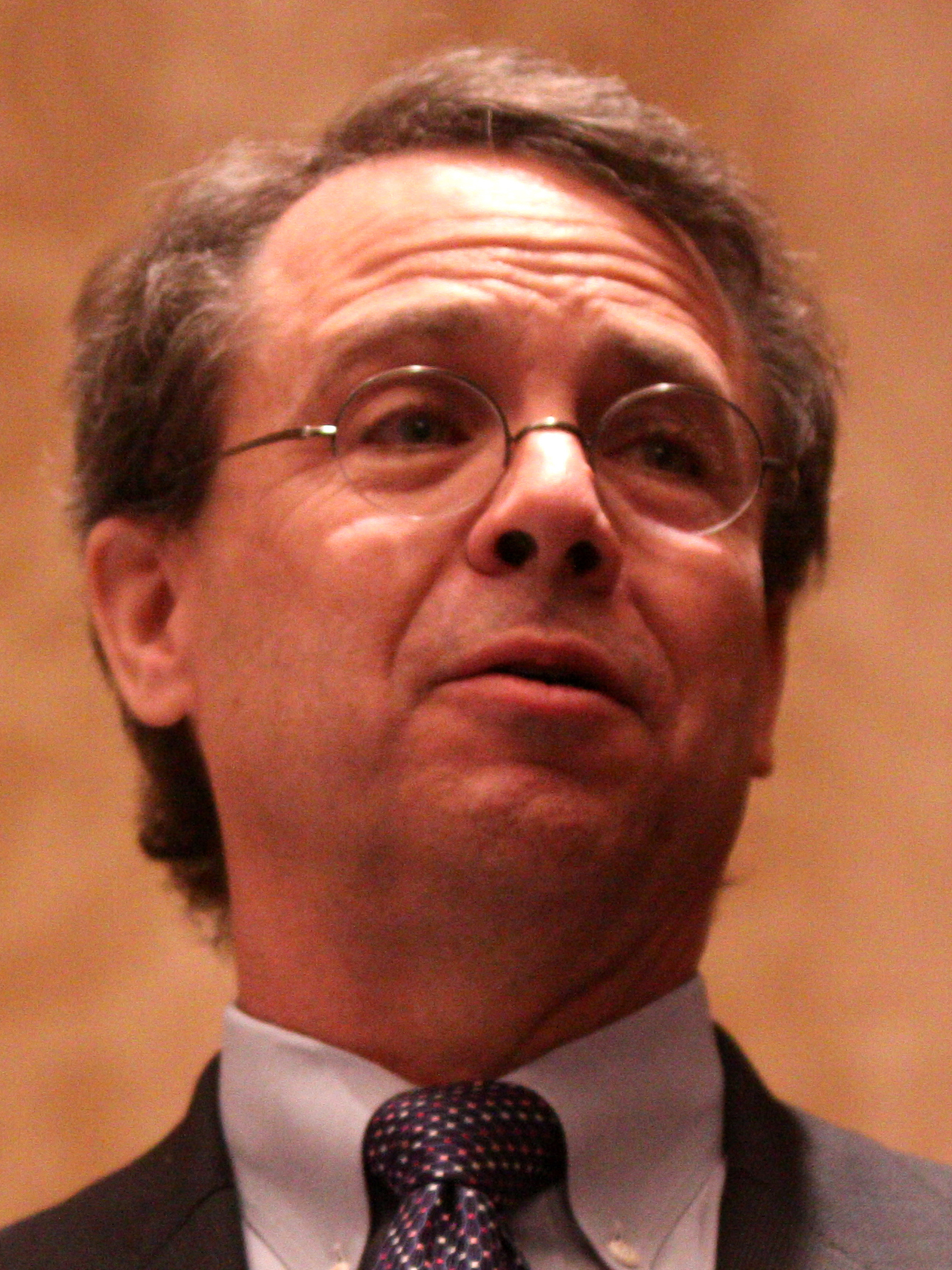
Candidate	Jacob Hornberger
Home state	Virginia
Delegate count	27
Popular vote	Default winner

Future of Freedom Foundation Founder Jacob Hornberger was the sole candidate to qualify for the New York primary ballot. Therefore, in accordance with state law, he was declared the winner of the primary by default. As the winner of the primary, Libertarian Party of New York rules permitted Hornberger to choose 27 of the state's 48 unbound delegates to the 2020 Libertarian National Convention. The Libertarian Party of New York was the only Libertarian state affiliate to choose any of its delegates on the basis of its presidential primary or caucus.

=== Independence ===
The Independence Party of New York nominated independent candidates Brock Pierce for president and Karla Ballard for vice president.

== General election ==
=== Predictions ===
Source	Ranking	As of
The Cook Political Report	Safe D	November 3, 2020
Inside Elections	Safe D	November 3, 2020
Sabato's Crystal Ball	Safe D	November 3, 2020
Politico	Safe D	November 3, 2020
RCP	Safe D	November 3, 2020
Niskanen	Safe D	November 3, 2020
CNN	Safe D	November 3, 2020
The Economist	Safe D	November 3, 2020
CBS News	Likely D	November 3, 2020
270towin	Safe D	November 3, 2020
ABC News	Safe D	November 3, 2020
NPR	Likely D	November 3, 2020
NBC News	Safe D	November 3, 2020
538	Safe D	November 3, 2020

=== Polling ===
View source data.

Aggregate polls

Source of poll aggregation	Dates administered	Dates updated	Joe Biden Democratic	Donald Trump Republican	Other/ Undecided (Note: Calculated by taking the difference of 100% and all other candidates combined.)	Margin
Real Clear Politics	April 30 – September 29, 2020	November 3, 2020	59.7%	31.0%	9.3%	Biden +28.7
FiveThirtyEight	until November 2, 2020	November 3, 2020	62.3%	32.9%	4.8%	Biden +29.4
Average			61.0%	32.0%	7.1%	Biden +29.1

Polls

Poll source	Date(s) administered	Sample size (Note: Key: A – all adults RV – registered voters LV – likely voters V – unclear)	Margin of error	Donald Trump Republican	Joe Biden Democratic	Jo Jorgensen Libertarian	Howie Hawkins Green	Other	Undecided
SurveyMonkey/Axios	Oct 20 – Nov 2, 2020	6,548 (LV)	± 2%	35% (Note: Overlapping sample with the previous SurveyMonkey/Axios poll, but more information available regarding sample size)	63%	–	–	–	–
Research Co.	Oct 31 – Nov 1, 2020	450 (LV)	± 4.6%	34%	64%	-	-	2% (Note: "Someone else" with 2%)	4%
SurveyMonkey/Axios	Oct 1–28, 2020	10,220 (LV)	–	34%	63%	-	-	–	–
Swayable	Oct 23–26, 2020	495 (LV)	± 5.8%	33%	65%	1%	1%	–	–
SurveyMonkey/Axios	Sep 1–30, 2020	10,007 (LV)	–	34%	64%	-	-	–	2%
Siena College	Sep 27–29, 2020	504 (LV)	± 4.4%	29%	61%	0%	1%	2% (Note: Pierce (I) with 2%, "someone else" and would not vote with 0%)	7%
SurveyMonkey/Axios	Aug 1–31, 2020	9,969 (LV)	–	34%	64%	-	-	–	2%
Public Policy Polling	Aug 20–22, 2020	1,029 (V)	± 3.1%	32%	63%	-	-	–	5%
SurveyMonkey/Axios	Jul 1–31, 2020	10,280 (LV)	–	34%	63%	-	-	–	2%
SurveyMonkey/Axios	Jun 8–30, 2020	4,555 (LV)	–	33%	65%	-	-	–	2%
Siena College	Jun 23–25, 2020	806 (RV)	± 3.9%	32%	57%	-	-	–	10%
Siena College	May 17–21, 2020	767 (RV)	± 3.7%	32%	57%	-	-	–	11%
Quinnipiac University	Apr 30 – May 4, 2020	915 (RV)	± 3.2%	32%	55%	-	-	5% (Note: "Someone else" with 3%; would not vote with 2%)	8%
Siena College	Apr 19–23, 2020	803 (RV)	± 3.7%	29%	65%	-	-	–	6%
Siena College	Mar 22–26, 2020	566 (RV)	± 4.5%	33%	58%	-	-	–	10%
Siena College	Feb 16–20, 2020	658 (RV)	± 4.5%	36%	55%	-	-	–	5%

Former candidates

with Donald Trump and Michael Bloomberg

Poll source	Date(s) administered	Sample size	Margin of error	Donald Trump (R)	Michael Bloomberg (D)	Other	Undecided
Siena College	Feb 16–20, 2020	658 (RV)	± 4.5%	33%	58%	–	9%

with Donald Trump and Pete Buttigieg

Poll source	Date(s) administered	Sample size	Margin of error	Donald Trump (R)	Pete Buttigieg (D)	Other	Undecided
Siena College	Feb 16–20, 2020	658 (RV)	± 4.5%	37%	56%	–	7%

with Donald Trump and Bill de Blasio

Poll source	Date(s) administered	Sample size	Margin of error	Donald Trump (R)	Bill de Blasio (D)	Other	Undecided
Siena College	Jun 2–6, 2019	812 (RV)	± 4.1%	36%	48%	13%	3%

with Donald Trump and Kirsten Gillibrand

Poll source	Date(s) administered	Sample size	Margin of error	Donald Trump (R)	Kirsten Gillibrand (D)	Other	Undecided
Siena College	Jun 2–6, 2019	812 (RV)	± 4.1%	34%	58%	5%	3%

with Donald Trump and Amy Klobuchar

Poll source	Date(s) administered	Sample size	Margin of error	Donald Trump (R)	Amy Klobuchar (D)	Other	Undecided
Siena College	Feb 16–20, 2020	658 (RV)	± 4.5%	37%	53%	–	10%

with Donald Trump and Bernie Sanders

Poll source	Date(s) administered	Sample size	Margin of error	Donald Trump (R)	Bernie Sanders (D)	Other	Undecided
Siena College	Feb 16–20, 2020	658 (RV)	± 4.5%	38%	56%	–	7%

with Donald Trump and Elizabeth Warren

Poll source	Date(s) administered	Sample size	Margin of error	Donald Trump (R)	Elizabeth Warren (D)	Other	Undecided
Siena College	Feb 16–20, 2020	658 (RV)	± 4.5%	39%	53%	–	8%

=== Electoral slates ===
These electors were nominated by each party in order to vote in the Electoral College should their candidate win the state:

Joe Biden and Kamala Harris Democratic Party Working Families Party	Donald Trump and Mike Pence Republican Party Conservative Party	Jo Jorgensen and Spike Cohen Libertarian Party	Howie Hawkins and Angela Walker Green Party	Brock Pierce and Karla Ballard Independence Party
June O'Neill; Xiao Wang; Katherine M. Sheehan; Thomas J. Garry; Lovely Warren; Gary S. LaBarbera; Stuart H. Applebaum; Mary Sullivan; George K. Gresham; Randi Weingarten; Mario F. Cilento; Alphonso David; Hazel Nell Dukes; Christine Quinn; Byron Brown; Corey Johnson; Scott Stringer; Andrea Stewart-Cousins; Carl Heastie; Jay Jacobs; Letitia James; Thomas DiNapoli; Kathy Hochul; Andrew Cuomo; Hillary Clinton; Bill Clinton; Rubén Díaz Jr. Judith Hunter; Anastasia Somoza	Brendan Lantry; Jesus Garcia; Susan McNeil; Joseph Cairo; William Napier; Karl Simmeth; Christine Benedict; Joann Ariola; Carl Zeilman; Jennifer Saul Rich; Charlie Joyce; Adrian Anderson; Rob Ortt; Will Barclay; John Burnett; Chloe Sun; Elie Hirschfeld; Yechezkel Moskowitz; Shaun Marie Levine; Christopher Kendall; Francis Vella-Marrone; Andrea Catsimatidis; John Gereau; Rodney Strange; Todd Rouse; Trisha Turner; Robert Keis; Nick Langworthy; Tom Dadey	Daniel P. Donnelly; Duane J. Whitmer; Robert M. Arrigo; Mark N. Axinn; Erin M. Becker; Rachel E. Becker; Richard Bell; Kari R. Bittner; Mark S. Braiman; Jay A. Carr; Tucker C. Coburn; Anthony D'Orazio; Kevin A. Wilson; Milva E. Dordal; Pietro S. Geraci; Paul M. Grindle; Mark E. Glogowski; Shawn Hannon; Andrew M. Kolstee; Peyton D. Kunselman; Brandon G. Lyon; Leonard E. Morlock; Lora L. Newell; Gary Popkin; Thomas D. Quiter; Ilya Schwartzburg; Paul C. Sechrist; Larry Sharpe; William C. Anderson	Stephen Bloom; Peter A. Lavenia; Cassandra J. Lems; Paul W. Gilman; Darin Robbins; Barbara A. Kidney; Joseph R. Naham; Michael E. O'Neil; Eric M. Jones; Carol S. Przybylak; Tatianna M. Moragne; James R. Brown III; James McCabe; Candace Carponter; Michael D. Emperor; Jennifer R. White; Allan D. Hunter; Mary B. House; Serena L. Seals; David Sutliff-Atias; Craig A. Seeman; Daneilla Liebling; Adrienne R. Craig-Williams; Christopher J. Archer; Claudia Flanagan; Gil Obler; Debra A. Rosario; Gloria Mattera; David L. Giannascoli	Kenneth Bayne; Scott R. Major; Robert G. Pilnick; Barbara Pilnick; Gary P. Newman; Arthur Abbate; Joseph W. Fuller; Maryann H. Major; Andrew J. Bogardt; Anna C. Bogardt; Robert J. Bogardt; Trisha L. Sterling; Thomas Hatfield; Thomas A. Connolly; Atef S. Zeina; Lee Kolesnikoff; Joseph L. Baruth; Paul E. Caputo; Edward G. Miller; Thomas S. Connolly; Dennis R. Zack; Michael Amo; Richard S. Bellando; Maryellen Bellando; William Bogardt; Teresa Bogardt; Frank M. MacKay; Kristin A. MacKay; Carolyn P. Major

== Results ==
2020 United States presidential election in New York
Party	Candidate	Votes	%	±%
Democratic	Joe Biden Kamala Harris	4,858,273	56.38%	−0.34%
Working Families	Joe Biden Kamala Harris	386,613	4.48%	+2.65%
Total	Joe Biden; Kamala Harris	5,244,886	60.87%	+1.85%
Republican	Donald Trump Mike Pence	2,955,662	34.30%	+1.57%
Conservative	Donald Trump Mike Pence	296,335	3.44%	−0.34%
Total	Donald Trump Mike Pence	3,251,997	37.74%	+1.22%
Libertarian	Jo Jorgensen Spike Cohen	60,383	0.70%	−0.05%
Green	Howie Hawkins Angela Walker	32,832	0.38%	−1.02%
Independence	Brock Pierce Karla Ballard	22,656	0.26%	−1.29%
Write-in		4,107	0.04%	-0.75%
Total votes		8,616,861	100.00%	+11.60%

=== New York City results ===
2020 presidential election in New York City		Manhattan	The Bronx	Brooklyn	Queens	Staten Island	Total	
Democratic- Working Families	Joe Biden	603,040	355,374	703,310	569,038	90,997	2,321,759	76.2%
Democratic- Working Families	Joe Biden	86.4%	83.3%	76.8%	72.0%	42.0%	2,321,759	76.2%
Republican- Conservative	Donald Trump	85,185	67,740	202,772	212,665	123,320	691,682	22.7%
Republican- Conservative	Donald Trump	12.2%	15.9%	22.1%	26.9%	56.9%	691,682	22.7%
Others	Others	9,588	3,579	9,927	8,278	2,450	33,822	1.1%
Others	Others	1.4%	0.9%	1.1%	1.1%	1.1%	33,822	1.1%
Total		697,813	426,693	916,009	789,981	216,767	3,047,263	100.00%

==== By New York City Council district ====
2020 presidential election New York City Council map

Biden won 47 of 51 New York City Council districts, including one held by a Republican, while Trump won four districts, including two held by Democrats.

District	Biden	Trump	City council member
1st	83.5%	14.9%	Margaret Chin
2nd	86.9%	11.7%	Carlina Rivera
3rd	87.8%	10.7%	Corey Johnson
4th	80.4%	18.0%	Keith Powers
5th	82.5%	16.0%	Ben Kallos
6th	88.5%	10.2%	Helen Rosenthal
7th	89.8%	9.0%	Mark Levine
8th	87.5%	11.5%	Diana Ayala
9th	93.4%	5.5%	Bill Perkins
10th	84.5%	14.3%	Ydanis Rodriguez
11th	79.4%	19.3%	Andrew Cohen
12th	92.2%	7.2%	Andy King
13th	64.7%	34.2%	Mark Gjonaj
14th	83.3%	16.0%	Fernando Cabrera
15th	84.8%	14.3%	Ritchie Torres
16th	87.2%	12.1%	Vanessa Gibson
17th	87.1%	12.2%	Rafael Salamanca
18th	86.7%	12.6%	Rubén Díaz Sr.
19th	54.4%	44.3%	Paul Vallone
20th	63.7%	35.2%	Peter Koo
21st	77.5%	21.7%	Francisco Moya
22nd	75.3%	23.2%	Costa Constantinides
23rd	69.5%	29.4%	Barry Grodenchik
24th	67.3%	31.7%	Rory Lancman
25th	73.8%	25.1%	Daniel Dromm
26th	80.0%	18.6%	Jimmy Van Bramer
27th	93.1%	6.3%	Daneek Miller
28th	86.5%	12.9%	Adrienne Adams
29th	65.7%	33.1%	Karen Koslowitz
30th	54.4%	44.3%	Robert Holden
31st	87.4%	11.9%	Donovan Richards
32nd	57.4%	41.6%	Eric Ulrich
33rd	78.8%	20.0%	Stephen Levin
34th	86.5%	12.0%	Antonio Reynoso
35th	91.5%	7.4%	Laurie Cumbo
36th	94.6%	4.1%	Robert Cornegy
37th	87.1%	11.7%	Darma Diaz
38th	76.5%	22.1%	Carlos Menchaca
39th	84.7%	14.1%	Brad Lander
40th	91.9%	7.1%	Mathieu Eugene
41st	94.3%	5.0%	Alicka Ampry-Samuel
42nd	92.9%	6.6%	Inez Barron
43rd	57.0%	41.4%	Justin Brannan
44th	25.1%	74.0%	Kalman Yeger
45th	82.0%	17.2%	Farah Louis
46th	75.3%	23.8%	Alan Maisel
47th	50.2%	48.8%	Ari Kagan
48th	33.8%	65.1%	Chaim Deutsch
49th	67.0%	31.7%	Debi Rose
50th	36.8%	62.0%	Steven Matteo
51st	27.2%	71.8%	Joe Borelli

=== By county ===
County	Joe Biden Democratic		Donald Trump Republican		Various candidates Other parties		Margin		Total votes cast
County	#	%	#	%	#	%	#	%	Total votes cast
Albany	99,474	64.55%	51,081	33.15%	3,546	2.30%	48,393	31.40%	154,101
Allegany	6,048	29.10%	14,135	68.02%	599	2.88%	-8,087	-38.92%	20,782
Bronx	355,374	83.29%	67,740	15.88%	3,579	0.83%	287,634	67.41%	426,693
Broome	47,002	50.53%	43,791	47.08%	2,223	2.39%	3,211	3.45%	93,016
Cattaraugus	11,879	34.17%	22,155	63.74%	726	2.09%	-10,276	-29.57%	34,760
Cayuga	16,359	44.44%	19,632	53.33%	818	2.23%	-3,273	-8.89%	36,809
Chautauqua	23,088	38.93%	34,853	58.77%	1,364	2.30%	-11,765	-19.84%	59,305
Chemung	16,636	42.21%	21,922	55.63%	852	2.16%	-5,286	-13.42%	39,410
Chenango	8,300	37.14%	13,496	60.38%	554	2.48%	-5,196	-23.24%	22,350
Clinton	18,364	51.82%	16,514	46.60%	559	1.58%	1,850	5.22%	35,437
Columbia	20,386	57.25%	14,464	40.62%	760	2.13%	5,922	16.63%	35,610
Cortland	10,370	47.83%	10,789	49.77%	520	2.40%	-419	-1.94%	21,679
Delaware	9,143	39.71%	13,387	58.14%	495	2.15%	-4,244	-18.43%	23,025
Dutchess	81,443	53.89%	66,872	44.25%	2,807	1.86%	14,571	9.64%	151,122
Erie	267,270	56.46%	197,552	41.73%	8,596	1.81%	69,718	14.73%	473,418
Essex	9,950	51.61%	8,982	46.59%	348	1.80%	968	5.02%	19,280
Franklin	9,253	48.02%	9,668	50.18%	347	1.80%	-415	-2.16%	19,268
Fulton	7,931	33.44%	15,378	64.84%	409	1.72%	-7,447	-31.40%	23,718
Genesee	9,625	32.94%	18,876	64.61%	716	2.45%	-9,251	-31.67%	29,217
Greene	10,346	41.07%	14,271	56.64%	577	2.29%	-3,925	-15.57%	25,194
Hamilton	1,178	34.05%	2,225	64.31%	57	1.64%	-1,047	-30.26%	3,460
Herkimer	9,939	33.90%	18,871	64.36%	512	1.74%	-8,932	-30.46%	29,322
Jefferson	17,307	39.46%	25,629	58.44%	919	2.10%	-8,322	-18.98%	43,855
Kings	703,310	76.78%	202,772	22.14%	9,927	1.08%	500,538	54.64%	916,009
Lewis	3,823	29.49%	8,890	68.57%	251	1.94%	-5,067	-39.08%	12,964
Livingston	12,477	39.73%	18,182	57.90%	742	2.37%	-5,705	-18.17%	31,401
Madison	14,805	43.50%	18,409	54.09%	821	2.41%	-3,604	-10.59%	34,035
Monroe	225,746	59.25%	145,661	38.23%	9,582	2.52%	80,085	21.02%	380,989
Montgomery	7,977	37.69%	12,745	60.22%	442	2.09%	-4,768	-22.53%	21,164
Nassau	396,504	54.11%	326,716	44.59%	9,536	1.30%	69,788	9.52%	732,756
New York	603,040	86.42%	85,185	12.21%	9,588	1.37%	517,855	74.21%	697,813
Niagara	46,029	44.21%	56,068	53.85%	2,026	1.94%	-10,039	-9.64%	104,123
Oneida	41,973	41.15%	57,860	56.73%	2,163	2.12%	-15,887	-15.58%	101,996
Onondaga	138,991	58.88%	91,715	38.85%	5,362	2.27%	47,276	20.03%	236,068
Ontario	28,749	48.48%	28,782	48.54%	1,769	2.98%	-33	-0.06%	59,300
Orange	84,955	49.24%	85,068	49.30%	2,516	1.46%	-113	-0.06%	172,539
Orleans	5,587	30.78%	12,126	66.80%	441	2.42%	-6,539	-36.02%	18,154
Oswego	21,145	38.80%	32,142	58.98%	1,211	2.22%	-10,997	-20.18%	54,498
Otsego	12,975	46.21%	14,382	51.22%	723	2.57%	-1,407	-5.01%	28,080
Putnam	24,955	45.27%	29,283	53.12%	884	1.61%	-4,328	-7.85%	55,122
Queens	569,038	72.03%	212,665	26.92%	8,278	1.05%	356,373	45.11%	789,981
Rensselaer	40,969	51.59%	36,500	45.96%	1,940	2.45%	4,469	5.63%	79,409
Richmond	90,997	41.98%	123,320	56.89%	2,450	1.13%	-32,323	-14.91%	216,767
Rockland	75,802	50.30%	73,186	48.56%	1,714	1.14%	2,616	1.74%	150,702
Saratoga	68,471	51.62%	61,305	46.21%	2,879	2.17%	7,166	5.41%	132,655
Schenectady	42,465	56.58%	30,741	40.96%	1,841	2.46%	11,724	15.62%	75,047
Schoharie	5,345	34.02%	9,903	63.04%	462	2.94%	-4,558	-29.02%	15,710
Schuyler	3,903	39.97%	5,621	57.56%	242	2.47%	-1,718	-17.59%	9,766
Seneca	6,914	44.23%	8,329	53.28%	389	2.49%	-1,415	-9.05%	15,632
St. Lawrence	19,361	43.11%	24,608	54.80%	938	2.09%	-5,247	-11.69%	44,907
Steuben	15,790	34.19%	29,474	63.83%	915	1.98%	-13,684	-29.64%	46,179
Suffolk	381,021	49.27%	381,253	49.30%	11,013	1.43%	-232	-0.03%	773,287
Sullivan	15,489	44.71%	18,665	53.87%	493	1.42%	-3,176	-9.16%	34,647
Tioga	9,634	38.48%	14,791	59.08%	611	2.44%	-5,157	-20.60%	25,036
Tompkins	33,619	73.51%	11,096	24.26%	1,020	2.23%	22,523	49.25%	45,735
Ulster	57,970	59.51%	37,590	38.59%	1,860	1.90%	20,380	20.92%	97,420
Warren	17,642	48.80%	17,699	48.96%	808	2.24%	-57	-0.16%	36,149
Washington	11,565	41.10%	15,941	56.65%	632	2.25%	-4,376	-15.55%	28,138
Wayne	17,456	39.03%	26,204	58.59%	1,067	2.38%	-8,748	-19.56%	44,727
Westchester	312,437	67.57%	144,731	31.30%	5,196	1.13%	167,706	36.27%	462,364
Wyoming	5,073	26.11%	13,898	71.52%	461	2.37%	-8,825	-45.41%	19,432
Yates	4,219	39.35%	6,208	57.89%	296	2.76%	-1,989	-18.54%	10,723
Totals	5,244,886	60.76%	3,251,997	37.67%	135,372	1.57%	1,992,889	23.09%	8,632,255

Counties that flipped from Republican to Democratic

- Broome (county seat: Binghamton)
- Essex (county seat: Elizabethtown)
- Rensselaer (county seat: Troy)
- Saratoga (county seat: Ballston Spa)

=== By congressional district ===
Biden won 20 of 27 congressional districts, including one held by a Republican.

District	Biden	Trump	Representative
1st	47.3%	51.5%	Lee Zeldin
2nd	47.4%	51.4%	Andrew Garbarino
3rd	54.7%	44.3%	Thomas Suozzi
4th	55.6%	43.4%	Kathleen Rice
5th	83.3%	16.2%	Gregory Meeks
6th	61.8%	37.4%	Grace Meng
7th	81.9%	17.3%	Nydia Velázquez
8th	82.9%	16.5%	Hakeem Jeffries
9th	81.4%	17.8%	Yvette Clarke
10th	76.1%	22.9%	Jerry Nadler
11th	44.3%	54.8%	Nicole Malliotakis
12th	84.1%	14.8%	Carolyn Maloney
13th	88.2%	11.1%	Adriano Espaillat
14th	73.7%	25.9%	Alexandria Ocasio-Cortez
15th	86.4%	13%	Ritchie Torres
16th	75.3%	23.8%	Jamaal Bowman
17th	59.6%	39.4%	Mondaire Jones
18th	51.8%	46.8%	Sean Patrick Maloney
19th	49.8%	48.3%	Antonio Delgado
20th	59.3%	38.7%	Paul Tonko
21st	43.8%	54.2%	Elise Stefanik
22nd	43.2%	54.7%	Claudia Tenney
23rd	43.3%	54.5%	Tom Reed
24th	53.4%	44.4%	John Katko
25th	60.1%	37.8%	Joe Morelle
26th	62.6%	35.6%	Brian Higgins
27th	41.1%	56.8%	Chris Jacobs

== Analysis ==
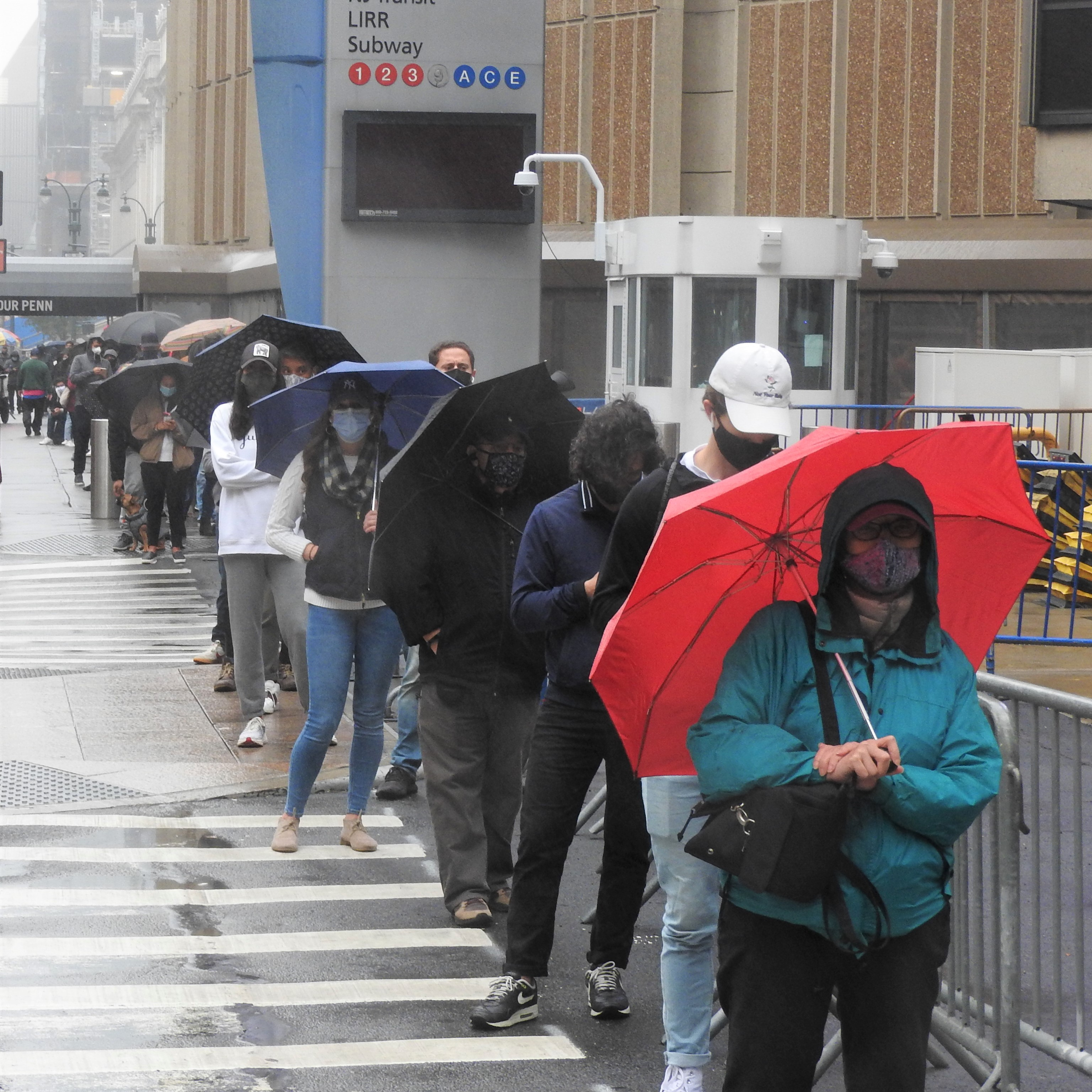
Waiting in line for early voting

New York continued its streak as a solidly blue state, with Biden winning 60.87% of the vote to Trump's 37.74%, a Democratic victory margin of 23.13%. Due to a decrease in third-party voting, both candidates increased their party's vote share from 2016, though Biden's margin of victory was slightly wider than Hillary Clinton's. Statewide elections in New York are heavily influenced by New York City, a Democratic stronghold which tends to provide sizable margins to the Democratic Party though every Democratic nominee since Bill Clinton's first run (1992) still would have won statewide if it were excluded. Biden continued this streak as he would have won upstate New York (excluding New York City's results), albeit by a much smaller 52.4% to 45.9% margin, or 2,923,127 votes to Trump's 2,561,315.

New York's inexperience processing a large number of mail ballots, having only legalized no-excuse absentee voting in 2019, led to weekslong delays in counting them. Over two million ballots and over 20% of the votes were cast by mail. New York failed to meet its November 28 deadline to certify the election, with hundreds of thousands of votes still uncounted. State Senator Michael Gianaris commented, "if we were a swing state in this presidential election, this would be a national scandal". New York's voting tabulation was updated on March 15, 2021.

The delay in the counting of mail-in ballots wrongly made it seem at first that Biden had underperformed Hillary Clinton in 2016, a phenomenon referred to as a "red mirage." However, when all the votes were counted, Biden outperformed Clinton's margin over Trump by about 0.6 percentage points. This was due to a major improvement across Upstate New York and on Long Island. Meanwhile, four of New York City's five boroughs shifted towards Trump (with the exception of Staten Island, which shifted left by less than 1%).

Donald Trump is the first Republican to receive 3 million or more raw votes in New York since George H. W. Bush in 1988.

Biden flipped four counties that Trump won in 2016: Broome, Essex, Rensselaer, and Saratoga. Biden also came very close to flipping an additional six counties, as he lost Cortland County by 419 votes, Franklin County by 415 votes, Ontario County by 33 votes, Orange County by 113 votes, Suffolk County by 232 votes, and Warren County by just 57 votes. Trump's narrow victories in these counties meant that they were decided by a combined total of just 1,269 votes out of more than 1 million votes cast across all six counties. According to exit polls by CNN, Biden won 96% of Democrats, who were 41% of the electorate, 59% of Independents, who made up 32% of voters, and 21% of Republicans, who made up 27% of the vote.

Biden dominated core Democratic constituencies in New York City, winning 76% of the city's vote. Statewide, Biden won 94% of Black voters and 76% of Latino voters. In urban Dominican neighborhoods, Trump reached only 15% of the vote to Biden's 85%. Biden also won by 18 points in the Hudson Valley and urban Upstate counties. Trump's core support base came from rural Upstate counties. However, Trump made strong inroads with Orthodox Jewish neighborhoods of New York City and in Hasidic Jewish communities in Rockland County. The shift is attributed to Trump's strong pro-Israel stance as president. New York was one of five states in the nation in which Biden's victory margin was larger than 1 million raw votes, the others being California, Maryland, Massachusetts and Illinois.

=== Edison exit polls ===
2020 presidential election in New York by demographic subgroup (Edison exit polling)
Demographic subgroup	Biden	Trump	% of total vote
Total vote	60.87	37.74	100
Ideology
Liberals	86	13	33
Moderates	63	35	44
Conservatives	21	79	23
Party
Democrats	97	3	39
Republicans	18	81	30
Independents	57	40	31
Gender
Men	60	39	48
Women	62	37	52
Race/ethnicity
White	50	48	60
Black	94	6	12
Latino	76	22	16
Asian	–	–	8
Other	–	–	4
Age
18–29 years old	65	33	17
30–39 years old	64	33	14
40–49 years old	68	29	20
50–64 years old	57	43	30
65 and older	51	47	19
Sexual orientation
LGBT	–	–	4
Not LGBT	60	37	96
Education
High school or less	49	51	16
Some college education	65	33	21
Associate degree	37	61	15
Bachelor's degree	70	29	24
Postgraduate degree	71	26	23
Region
New York City	76	22	36
Long Island	–	–	17
Hudson Valley	58	40	17
Urban Upstate	58	41	15
Rural Upstate	46	53	15
Area type
Urban	73	26	48
Suburban	50	49	44
Rural	–	–	8

== See also ==
- United States presidential elections in New York
- Presidency of Joe Biden
- 2020 New York state elections
- 2020 United States presidential election
- 2020 Democratic Party presidential primaries
- 2020 Libertarian Party presidential primaries
- 2020 Republican Party presidential primaries
- 2020 United States elections
