= Frank Milano =

Frank Milano may refer to:

- Frank Milano (judge), Judge of the New York Court of Claims
- Frank Milano (mobster), boss of the Cleveland crime family
- Sonny Milano, professional hockey player
