= Randy Daniels =

American politician

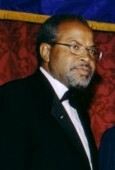
- Daniels receiving awards from the New York Sergeant's Benevolence Association during 2007 Support the Troops gala

61st Secretary of State of New York
- In office 2001 – 2005
- Governor: George Pataki
- Preceded by: Alexander Treadwell
- Succeeded by: Christopher Jacobs

First Deputy Mayor of New York City
- In office 1992 – 1992
- Mayor: David Dinkins
- Preceded by: William Lynch Jr.

Personal details
- Born: 1950 (age 75–76) Chicago, Illinois, U.S.
- Party: Republican (since 2002)
- Other political affiliations: Democratic (1986–2002)
- Spouse: Sallie Manzanet-Daniels
- Children: 2 and 1 step-daughter
- Education: Southern Illinois University (BA)

Randy Daniels (born 1950) is an American businessman, politician, and journalist who served as Secretary of State of New York from 2001 to 2005.

Daniels was appointed to the board of trustees of the State University of New York in 1997 and currently serves as vice chairman. He was previously the senior vice president for economic revitalization at the Empire State Development Corporation. He was nominated for both positions by former governor George Pataki. Daniels launched an unsuccessful Republican primary bid for Governor of New York in 2006.

Daniels served as the director of communications for the New York City Council President's Office from 1986 to 1988, and was appointed press secretary to the prime minister of the Bahamas in 1988. In 1992, he briefly became first deputy mayor of New York City under David Dinkins. Prior to his career in public service, Daniels worked as a correspondent for CBS News and professor of journalism.

== Early life and education ==
Daniels grew up in Chicago in a housing project with nine siblings. The family later moved to suburban Markham, Illinois. He holds a bachelor's degree in government and journalism from Southern Illinois University. He is a former journalist and public relations professional.

Daniel's wife, Sallie Manzanet-Daniels, was appointed as New York State Judge by Governor David Paterson in 2009.

== Career ==
=== Journalism and academia ===
He began his journalism career in Chicago, as a reporter for WVON radio. He was then employed with CBS News, first as a war correspondent for throughout the 1970s, and later as their Africa Bureau Chief in 1977. He became a familiar face on the evening news, covering eight wars and the Iranian Revolution. During this time he also worked adjunct Journalism professor at both the City College of New York and Columbia University's Graduate School of Journalism.

=== Politics ===
In 1986 he became communications director for Andrew Stein, president of the New York City Council. He later became press secretary for the prime minister of the Bahamas in 1988.

Daniels began his career as a Democrat, but changed his party registration to Republican in 2002. He was briefly the first deputy mayor of New York City under former mayor David Dinkins. He was appointed as Pataki's secretary of state in 2001 and served in that capacity until 2005. He was considered a possible running mate for Pataki in 2002 for lieutenant governor.

Daniels was a candidate for the Republican nomination for Governor of New York in 2006. He was considered the most articulate speaker in the race, and gained support from party leaders in Central New York, particularly in Syracuse. Daniels also won support from leaders of the state's Conservative Party.

On April 9, 2006 it was reported that Daniels would end his campaign the next day and endorse former Assembly Minority Leader John Faso for governor. He denied that he was seeking to be Faso's running mate for lieutenant governor. Faso later choose Rockland County Executive C. Scott Vanderhoef as his running mate.

Daniels was considered a possible future candidate for Governor of New York or chairman of the New York Republican State Committee, though he has said he does not have plans to run for office again, and would rather support Republicans from the private sector.

=== Business ===
Daniels served as vice chairman of Gilford Securities Incorporated from 2007 to 2015, and now serves as managing director of Pickwick Capital Partners, LLC, an investment banking firm based in White Plains, New York.

Political offices
Preceded by Alexander Treadwell	Secretary of State of New York; 2001 – 2005	Succeeded by Frank Milano; Acting
