= Erie County Executive =

Executive of Erie County
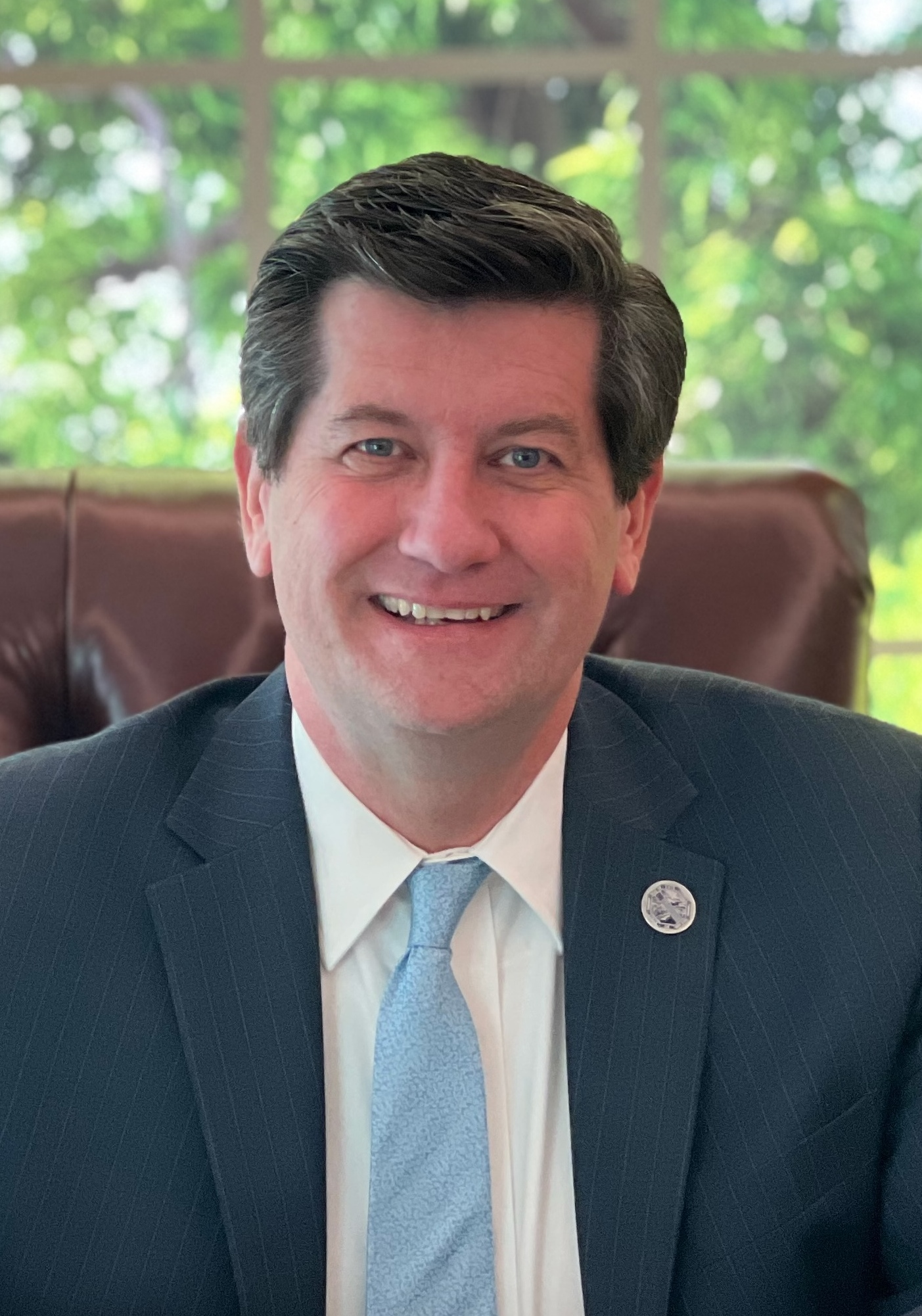
- Incumbent; Mark Poloncarz since January 3, 2012
- Style: County executive (informal); The Honorable (formal)
- Term length: Four years; renewable
- Inaugural holder: Edward A. Rath
- Formation: 1962
- Salary: $144,690 (2025)
- Website: www4.erie.gov/exec/

The county executive of Erie County, New York, is the chief executive officer and administrative head of the county government. As per Article 3 Section 301 of the Erie County Charter, the executive manages the county business, directs the internal organization of administrative units which the executive has the power to appoint, and is the chief budget officer of the county. The office has existed under Erie County's charter since 1962. To date, eight individuals have served in the position.

The executive is elected to a four-year term. Incumbent Mark Poloncarz is the only county executive to have successfully won four consecutive terms. The executive offices are located in Buffalo, New York, which is also the county seat.
