= Sallie Manzanet-Daniels =

American lawyer

Associate Justice of the First Judicial Department
- Incumbent
- Assumed office 2009
- Appointed by: David Paterson

Justice on the New York Supreme Court
- In office 2001–2009

Judge on the New York City Civil Court
- In office 1999–2001

Personal details
- Spouse: Randy Daniels
- Education: Marymount Manhattan College; Hofstra University School of Law

Sallie Manzanet-Daniels is an associate justice of the New York Appellate Division of the Supreme Court, First Judicial Department.

== Early life and education ==
She is a 1985 graduate of Marymount Manhattan College and a 1988 graduate of Hofstra University School of Law. Manzanet-Daniels is married to Randy Daniels.

== Legal career ==
Prior to joining the bench, she was a criminal defense practitioner for the Legal Aid Society in the Bronx. She also worked as a Principal Law Clerk to Justice Frank Torres in Bronx Supreme Court and to Justice Luis A. Gonzalez, the then Administrative Judge for the 12th Judicial District.

She subsequently served on the New York City Civil Court from 1999 to 2001. She was a New York Supreme Court Justice, from 2001 to 2009. She was designated a Justice for the Appellate Division, First Judicial Department in 2009 by Governor David Paterson. She was the first woman of Puerto Rican descent to serve on the First Department.

== See also ==
- List of Hispanic and Latino American jurists
