= 2020 New York state elections =

- November 3, 2020

Elections were held in the State of New York on November 3, 2020. Primary elections occurred on June 23, 2020. All 27 seats in the U.S. House of Representatives were up for election, as were all 63 seats in the New York State Senate and all 150 seats in the New York State Assembly. The 2020 United States presidential election occurred on the same date as the general election.

On Election Day, Democratic presidential nominee Joe Biden defeated Republican incumbent president Donald Trump by a wide margin in New York and won the White House. In the elections to the U.S. House of Representatives, 19 Democrats and eight Republicans prevailed; two Democratic incumbents were defeated. In the New York State Senate elections, Democrats won 43 seats and Republicans won 20, thereby giving them a supermajority. Democrats retained their supermajority in the New York State Assembly.

== Federal elections ==
- 2020 United States presidential election in New York
- 2020 United States House of Representatives elections in New York
- 2020 New York's 27th congressional district special election

== State elections ==
- 2020 New York State Assembly election
- 2020 New York State Senate election

== See also ==
- Elections in New York (state)
- Bilingual elections requirement for New York (per Voting Rights Act Amendments of 2006)
