= Innate Immunotherapeutics =

Australian biopharmaceutical company

Innate Immunotherapeutics Limited
- Industry: Biotechnology
- Predecessor: Virionyx
- Successor: Amplia Therapeutics Limited
- Headquarters: Sydney, Australia
- Key people: Simon Wilkinson CEO
- Products: MIS416
- Website: https://www.ampliatx.com

Innate Immunotherapeutics (INNM) was a biopharmaceutical company, previously known as Virionyx, with headquarters in Sydney, Australia and a branch in Auckland, New Zealand. Their focus in 2009 was the "development of a new generation of immune response modifier for potential use in the treatment of a range of infectious diseases, certain cancers, and as a novel cellular and humoral adjuvant, " and developed a proprietary multiple sclerosis drug, MIS416. In April 2009 the firm changed its name to Innate Immunotherapeutics to reflect their focus on the development of MIS416, and moved their headquarters from Auckland, New Zealand to Sydney, Australia. On June 22, 2017, Innate Immunotherapeutics announced that the MIS416 clinical trials undertaken to evaluate its efficacy in managing secondary progressive multiple sclerosis (SPMS), had "failed to show any clinically meaningful benefit or statistical significance." These findings resulted in the stocks crashing on the Australian Securities Exchange (ASX).

Innate Immunotherapeutics received media attention in 2018 after its majority owner US Congressman Chris Collins was arrested for insider trading. In September, 2018, the company changed its name to Amplia Therapeutics Limited.

== History ==
In 2009, Gill Webster, Ph.D., was Innate Therapeutics' chief scientific officer. By 2009, MIS416 had "shown promising activity in preclinical proof-of-principle studies in cancer, infectious and autoimmune diseases In a 2009 article published by BioPharm International, researchers discussed the potential of the then-novel, MIS416 adjuvant as a therapeutic vaccine "for patients with cancer or acquired chronic infections, such as HIV, hepatitis, tuberculosis, and malaria".

MIS416 is "a myeloid-directed microparticle immune response modifier (derived from Cutibacterium acnes), which was originally developed as a vaccine adjuvant." "MIS416 has been suggested to modulate T-cell-mediated autoimmune responses in EAE by simultaneously activating innate Toll-like receptor 9 and nucleotide-binding oligomerization domain-containing protein 2."

According to White, O'Sullivan, Stone and La Flamme in their January 31, 2014 PLoS One article, the "restricted uptake of MIS416 by phagocytic cells results in targeted modulation of the innate wing of the immune system, which contrasts with soluble agonists, which can directly activate a broader range of innate and adaptive immune subsets". White, O'Sullivan, Stone and La Flamme also found that MIS416 "[suppressed] the development of proinflammatory T helper (Th)1, Th2, and Th17 cells in EAE, and [increased] the serum levels of IFN-γ and IFN-γ-associated proteins in 19 patients with SPMS."

"MIS416 was initially used in patients with SPMS outside of a formal clinical trial setting under compassionate use legislation in New Zealand."

Shirani also reported in 2016, that a "phase IIb trial [was] underway to further investigate the effect of MIS416 in progressive forms of MS (NCT02228213)".

On June 22, 2017, Innate Immunotherapeutics announced that the MIS416 clinical trials had "failed to show any clinically meaningful benefit or statistical significance." Their stocks immediately crashed on the Australian Securities Exchange (ASX).

On August 31, Innate Immunotherapeutics CEO announced that the firm would be closing over the next few months.

Innate's board of directors included Chairman Warwick Tong, CEO Simon Wilkinson, Robert Peach, Christian Behrenbruch, Christopher Burns, and Andrew J. Cooke.

== Chris Collins involvement ==
Innate Immunotherapeutics's largest stockholder by August 2016, the United States congressman Chris Collins (R-N.Y.), had begun investing in the company in 2002. Over the years Collins raised money for the company and was invited to serve on its board of directors.

In August 2016 Collins purchased 4 million more shares in Innate Immunotherapeutics making him the largest shareholder. At the same time Tom Price, who until 29 September 2017 was the 23rd United States Secretary of Health and Human Services, purchased 400,613 Innate Immunotherapeutics shares valued at $100,000 to $250,000. Senator Ron Wyden (D-Oregon) raised potential concerns about Price's Innate Immunotherapeutics investments which "could be affected by legislation that comes before Congress."

By June 8, 2017, Collins had announced that Innate's drug had just "completed a Phase 2B clinical trial", and Innate Immunotherapeutics "hopes to sell off the product later [in 2017]." On June 22, 2017, Collins learned through a "private email from [Innate Immunotherapeutics]' chief executive that the clinical trials for the "potentially lucrative experimental drug had failed." Collins' son, Cameron Collins, who held Innate Immunotherapeutics shares, avoided over $570,000 in losses by selling his stocks on June 22, after his father had warned him that the Phase 2B clinical trials had failed. By June 8, 2017 the price per share in the United States' over-the-counter (OTC) market of INNMF, had dropped to 58 cents per share". By June 27, it was reported that Collins, who was the largest INNMF stockholder, "incurred a paper loss of nearly $17 million".

In May 2017, White House ethics investigators "began probing Collins for his role in recruiting investors to buy stock in Innate Immunotherapeutics after several complaints were filed". Members of Congress are explicitly barred from trading stocks using insider information." In October 2017, the Office of Congressional Ethics (OCE) said they had "substantial reason" to believe that Collins had improperly used his public office to benefit Innate, and had forwarded nonpublic information to other investors.

On August 8, 2018, Collins, his son Cameron, and Cameron's fiancée's father Stephen Zarsky were arrested on insider trading charges. Collins resigned on October 1, 2019, the day before he pleaded guilty to insider trading. He was sentenced to 26 months in prison, while Cameron was sentenced to probation and community service.

== MIS416 ==
MIS416 is a vaccine adjuvant and "immunogen co-delivery system". In 2011, in an NIH publication MIS416 was described as a "non-toxic microparticle adjuvant derived from Propionibacterium acnes comprising immunostimulatory muramyl dipeptide and bacterial DNA promotes cross-priming and Th1 immunity". In 2015, Innate Immunotherapeutics described it as an "immunomodulator" for "patients with chronic progressive multiple sclerosis".

=== Clinical trials ===
Innate Immunotherapeutics undertook a 12-month clinical study (NCT02228213) with 13 patients with early funding from the research arm, Fast Forward LLC, of the National MS Society in the U.S. In 2016, the Phase 2B, placebo-controlled clinical trial of MIS416 which includes nine patients from the original trial, was underway. Research on MIS416 is undertaken in collaboration with Raleigh, North Carolina's INC Research under the tenure of CEO Alistair Macdonald.

== Renamed to Amplia Therapeutics ==
On September 5, 2018, Innate Immunotherapeutics changed their name to Amplia Therapeutics (Stock Code ASX: ATX)
