= Frank Milano (judge) =

American politician

62nd Secretary of State of New York
- Acting
- In office September 23, 2005 – April 19, 2006
- Governor: George Pataki
- Preceded by: Randy Daniels
- Succeeded by: Chris Jacobs

Personal details
- Education: University of Pennsylvania (BS); Albany Law School (JD)

Frank P. Milano is an American attorney and jurist serving as a Judge of the New York Court of Claims. He previously served as acting Secretary of State of New York.

== Education ==
Milano earned a Bachelor of Science degree from the University of Pennsylvania and a Juris Doctor from Albany Law School.

== Career ==
Milano served for several years in the administration of Governor George Pataki as the First Deputy Secretary of State, and became acting Secretary of State of New York upon the resignation of Randy Daniels on September 23, 2005. He held this post until the appointment of Chris Jacobs in April 2006.

Milano served for over four years as the part-time town judge in Bethlehem, New York, a suburb of Albany. He was nominated by Pataki to the Court of Claims in June 2006, and was confirmed by the State Senate to a nine-year term.

Political offices
Preceded by Randy Daniels	Secretary of State of New York; Acting; 2005 - 2006	Succeeded by Christopher Jacobs
