= Mark Poloncarz =

American politician (born 1967)

Mark C. Poloncarz
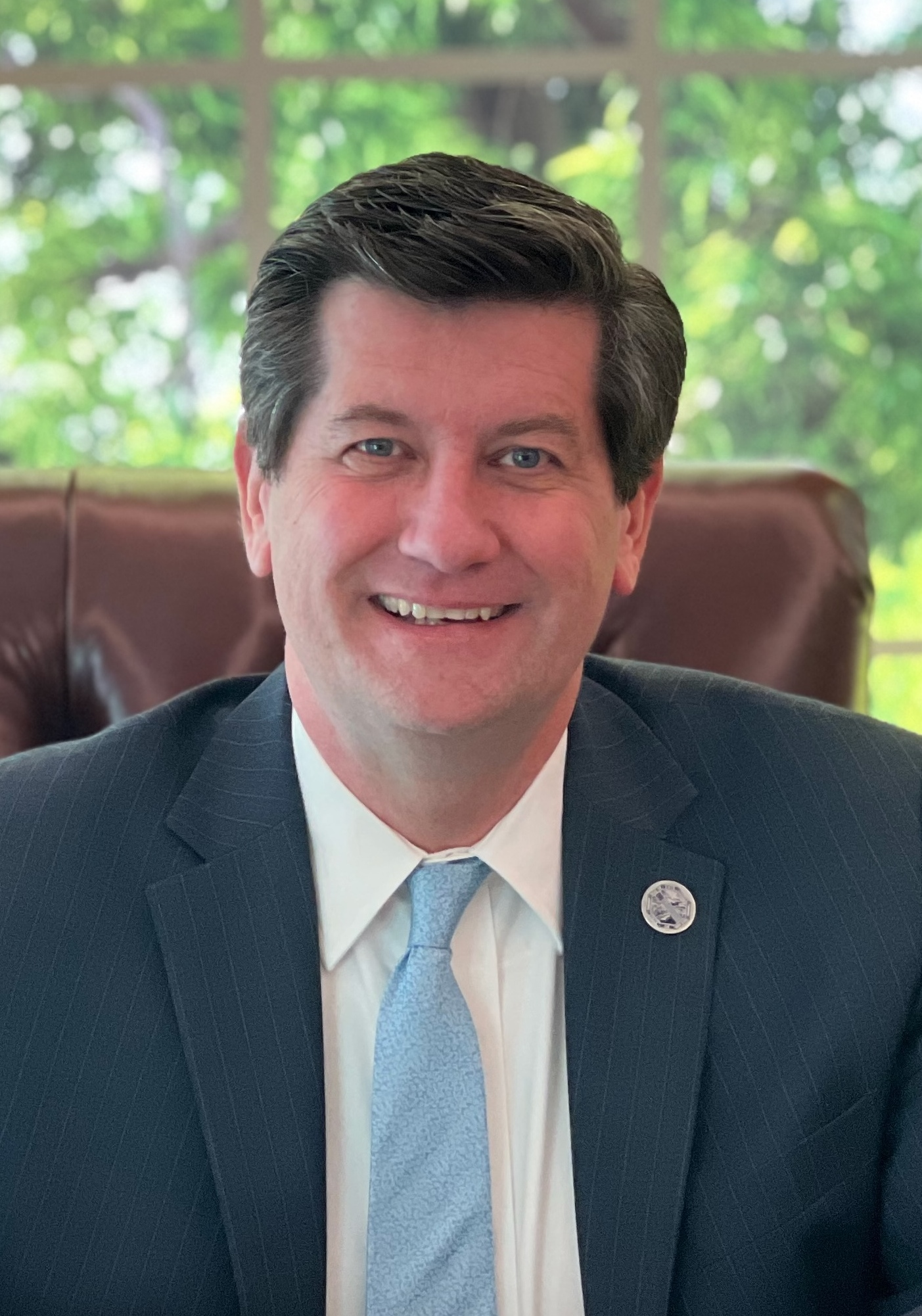
- Poloncarz in 2025

8th Erie County Executive
- Incumbent
- Assumed office January 2012
- Preceded by: Chris Collins

Erie County Comptroller
- In office 2006–2012
- Preceded by: James Hartman
- Succeeded by: David Shenk (acting)

Personal details
- Born: November 7, 1967 (age 58) Buffalo, New York, U.S.
- Party: Democratic
- Spouses: Elizabeth Smith (m. 2005; div. 2010); Lindsey Lauren Visser (m. 2026)
- Education: University at Buffalo (BA), University of Toledo (JD)
- Website: markpoloncarz.com

Mark Charles Poloncarz (/ˈpoʊlənˌkɑːrz/ POHL-ən-KARZ; born November 7, 1967) is an American politician who has served as the Erie County executive since 2012. He is also the vice chair of the National Democratic County Officials (NDCO). He formerly served as the North East regional representative for the National Association of Counties and continues to be a member of their finance committee.

In addition to successfully negotiating two Buffalo Bills NFL lease agreements, Poloncarz led Erie County's response to the COVID-19 pandemic, the 2022 Buffalo shooting, and multiple weather disasters, including the December 2022 North American winter storm.

== Early life and education ==
Mark Charles Poloncarz was born on November 7, 1967, in Buffalo, New York, to Polish-American parents. His father was a steelworker at Bethlehem Steel and his mother was a nurse.

The eldest of three brothers, Poloncarz was raised in Lackawanna, New York, and graduated from Lackawanna Senior High School before attending the University at Buffalo. He graduated with a bachelor's degree in political science in 1989 and attended the University of Toledo College of Law in Ohio, receiving his Juris Doctor in 1997.

== Political career ==
Prior to running for elected office, Poloncarz practiced business and finance law at Kavinoky and Cook. In 2003, he joined the John Kerry 2004 presidential campaign, serving as the Buffalo and Western New York coordinator and spokesperson. He was a delegate for Kerry in the 2004 Democratic presidential primary, representing New York's 27th congressional district.

In the 2008 Democratic presidential primary, Poloncarz was a delegate for Hillary Clinton in the same district. In 2020 and 2024, he was a delegate for Elizabeth Warren and Joe Biden, respectively.

=== Erie County Comptroller (2006–2012) ===
Following a financial crisis in Erie County, New York, government in April of 2005, Poloncarz announced a run for Erie County Comptroller. Endorsed by the Democratic Party, he won the party's primary election against Robert Whalen and Richard Parwarski.

In the November general election, Poloncarz ran against Republican John J. Canavan and Robert Whalen on the conservative line. On November 8, 2005, Poloncarz won the three-way Erie County Comptroller race with 56% of the vote.

During his first term, Poloncarz focused on restoring the county's financial stability and creditworthiness. In 2008, Erie County received its first bond rating upgrade in nearly a decade. Later that year, during the 2007–2008 financial crisis, he arranged a $75 million revenue anticipation note after credit markets froze.

Poloncarz was re-elected in 2009, defeating Republican Phillip C. Kadet and Independence Party candidate Michael J. Abramo with 52% of the vote. During his second term, Erie County received additional credit rating upgrades from Moody's Investors Service and Fitch Ratings.

Among initiatives implemented during his tenure as comptroller was the creation of a whistleblower hotline to allow the public to report waste, fraud, or abuse of county resources.

=== Erie County executive (2012–present) ===
Poloncarz announced his candidacy for Erie County executive in May 2011 and was endorsed by the Erie County Democratic Committee later that month. Poloncarz campaigned on restoring financial aid to the libraries and cultural institutions, reopening closed health clinics, investing in health and human services, and increasing programs and services while promising to be financially responsible with taxpayer dollars.

On November 8, 2011, Poloncarz defeated incumbent county executive Chris Collins in the 2011 Erie County, New York Executive election with 53 percent of the vote, becoming Erie County's 8th executive and only the second Democrat to hold the office. He assumed office the following year.

==== First term (2012–2016) ====
During his first term, Poloncarz pursued initiatives focused on economic development, reorganizing the county's Industrial Development Agency, creating a Medicaid anti-fraud task force, and the revamping the Department of Social Services. His 2013 proposed budget increased the county tax levy and reduced county employment.

In 2013, Erie County, the state of New York, and the Buffalo Bills reached a 10-year lease extension at Ralph Wilson Stadium, which included approximately $130 million in capital improvements. Poloncarz also led the county's response to the November 13-21, 2014 North American winter storm commonly known as "Snowvember."

In August 2015, he signed legislation prohibiting the sale of personal cosmetic products containing microbeads, one of the first such bans in the United States. This was one of the first pieces of legislation banning microbeads in the country, and later that year the federal government passed the Microbead-Free Waters Act of 2015.

Poloncarz was re-elected in 2015, defeating Republican State Assemblyman Ray Walter with 65% of the vote.

==== Second term (2016–2019) ====
During his second term, Poloncarz was appointed to a joint task force of the National Association of Counties and the National League of Cities addressing heroin and opioid abuse. His administration also pursued policies related to fair housing, consumer protection, climate change, protections for LGBTQ minors, and reform of the Erie County ethics laws.

In 2017, Erie County acquired 150 acres of the former Bethlehem Steel site, later expanded to form the Renaissance Commerce Park. In 2019, Poloncarz announced ErieNet, a county-owned fiber-optic broadband network intended to provide high-speed internet access countywide, and launched Live Well Erie, a county health and wellness initiative.

In September 2019, Poloncarz published his first book Beyond the X's and O's: Keeping the Bills in Buffalo through SUNY Press. The book detailed the negotiations and discussions that led to the 2013 ten-year lease extension between Erie County, the State of New York and the Buffalo Bills.

==== Third term (2019–2023) ====
Poloncarz was re-elected to a third term in November 2019.

His third term was dominated by the COVID-19 pandemic during which he declared a county state of emergency on March 15, 2020. The state of emergency lasted almost two years until Poloncarz rescinded it on March 5, 2022. At the height of the pandemic, Poloncarz implemented a series of measures that closely aligned with the New York state government response to the COVID-19 pandemic guidelines. At various times, Poloncarz and his health department were criticized for what was referred to as an overly aggressive approach.

As part of the county vaccination rollout, Poloncarz gained national attention for his "shot and a chaser" campaign, which provided drink coupons to individuals who received the COVID vaccine. Poloncarz was featured on the Daily Show with Trevor Noah. He also received widespread attention for his quarantine music video series "Songs for Friends," where he both played the guitar and sang covers of popular songs.

In the summer of 2020, Poloncarz was elected to the executive board of the National Association of Counties as the North East Regional Representative. His region included all counties from Maine, New Hampshire, Massachusetts, Vermont, New York, New Jersey, Connecticut, Rhode Island, Pennsylvania, Delaware, West Virginia, and Maryland.

In March 2022, Erie County, New York State, and the Buffalo Bills announced an agreement to construct a new stadium with a 30-year lease, with Erie County committing $250 million and securing a community benefits agreement exceeding $100 million.

Poloncarz also led the county response to the May 2022 Buffalo shooting, and major winter storms in November and December 2022.

In November 2023, Poloncarz made history by being the first Erie County executive elected to serve a fourth term. He also announced he would not seek a fifth term.

==== Fourth term (2023–present) ====
During his fourth term, Poloncarz has focused on affordable housing, the establishment of a county historical commission, and the creation of Erie Corps, a youth employment program modeled after the Civilian Conservation Corps.

In the spring of 2025, Poloncarz presented a full accounting of how Erie County invested its $178 million American Rescue Plan grant. The projects included major investments in sewer, parks, highway infrastructure, affordable housing, and creating a county wide high-speed fiberoptic broadband internet network known as Erie Net.

== Personal life ==
Poloncarz married public relations professional Elizabeth Smith in 2005; the couple divorced five years later. On July 7, 2025, he announced his engagement to historian Lindsey Lauren Visser. The two were married in June 2026.

== Electoral history ==
November 2005 Erie County Comptroller election
Party	Candidate	Votes	%	±%
Democratic	Mark Poloncarz	133,463	55.8%	
Republican	John Canavan	89,712	37.4%	
Conservative	Robert Whelan	16,335	6.8%	
Total votes		239,510	100.0%	

November 2009 Erie County Comptroller election
Party	Candidate	Votes	%	±%
Democratic	Mark Poloncarz	78,033	51.8%	
Republican	Phil Kadet	67,088	44.6	
Independent	Michael Abramo	5,191	3.4%	
Total votes		150,312	100.0%	

November 2011 Erie County Executive election
Party	Candidate	Votes	%	±%
Democratic	Mark Poloncarz	123,053	52.8%	
Republican	Chris Collins	110,050	47.2%	
Total votes		233,103	100.0%	

November 2015 Erie County Executive election
Party	Candidate	Votes	%	±%
Democratic	Mark Poloncarz	96,629	65.6%	
Republican	Raymond Walter	49,141	33.4%	
Green	Eric Jones	1,489	1%	
Total votes		147,259	100.0%	

November 2019 Erie County Executive election
Party	Candidate	Votes	%	±%
Democratic	Mark Poloncarz	114,102	53.7%	
Republican	Lynne Dixon	98,415	46.3%	
Total votes		212,517	100.0%	

November 2023 Erie County Executive election
Party	Candidate	Votes	%	±%
Democratic	Mark Poloncarz	118,308	58.6%	
Republican	Chrissy Casillio	81,072	40.2%	
Libertarian	Dwane Whitmer	2,323	1.1%	
Write-in	Mohammed Alam	45	0.0%	
Total votes		201,748	100.0%	
