= Chris Jacobs (politician) =

American politician (born 1966)

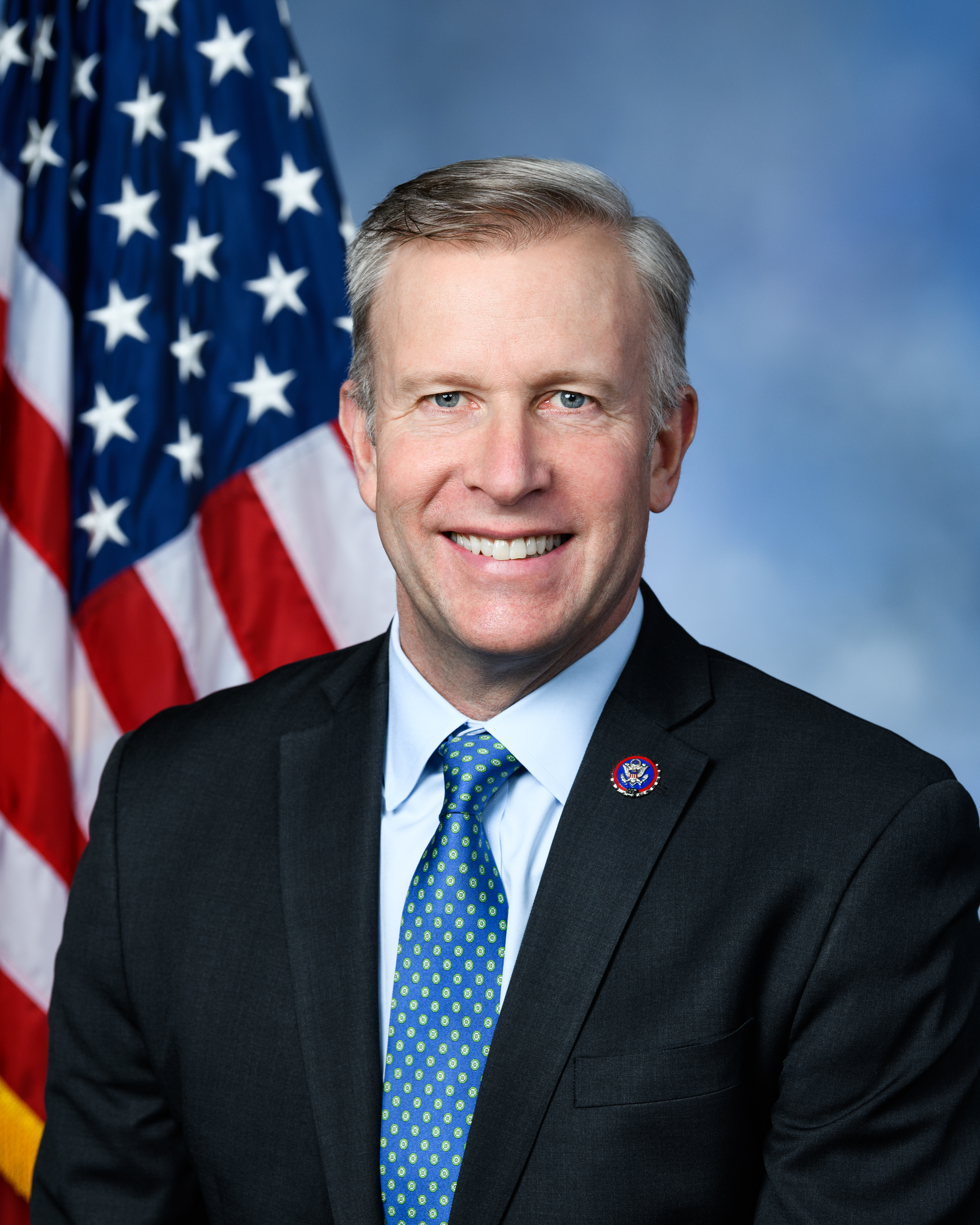
- Official portrait, 2021

Member of the U.S. House of Representatives from New York's 27th district
- In office June 23, 2020 – January 3, 2023 (Note: Jacobs's official service begins on the date of the special election, while he was not sworn in until July 21, 2020.)
- Preceded by: Chris Collins
- Succeeded by: Constituency abolished

Member of the New York State Senate from the 60th district
- In office January 1, 2017 – July 20, 2020
- Preceded by: Marc Panepinto
- Succeeded by: Sean Ryan

9th Clerk of Erie County
- In office January 1, 2012 – January 1, 2017
- Preceded by: Kathy Hochul
- Succeeded by: Mickey Kearns

62nd Secretary of State of New York
- In office April 19, 2006 – January 1, 2007
- Governor: George Pataki
- Preceded by: Frank Milano (acting)
- Succeeded by: Lorraine Cortés-Vázquez

Personal details
- Born: Christopher Louis Jacobs; November 28, 1966 (age 59) Buffalo, New York, U.S.
- Party: Republican
- Spouse: Martina Jacobs
- Relatives: Jeremy Jacobs (uncle); Jerry Jacobs Jr. (cousin); Charlie Jacobs (cousin)
- Education: Boston College (BA); American University (MA); University at Buffalo (JD)

Christopher Louis Jacobs (born November 28, 1966) is an American politician who represented New York's 27th congressional district in the United States House of Representatives from 2020 to 2023. Jacobs served as the 62nd secretary of state of New York from April 2006 to January 2007. Beginning in 2012, he held the post of Erie County clerk, and he was a Republican member of the New York State Senate for the 60th district from 2017 to 2020. On June 23, 2020, he won a special election to fill a congressional vacancy in the 27th district. He was reelected to a full term in November 2020.

Jacobs did not seek reelection in 2022, after receiving what Politico described as "rising backlash" from Republicans for supporting some gun control measures following the 2022 Buffalo shooting and the Robb Elementary School shooting.

== Early life and education ==
Jacobs was born in Buffalo, New York, as one of 5 siblings. His family has long owned the Delaware North Companies and the Boston Bruins hockey team. Jacobs earned his undergraduate degree from Boston College, a master's degree from American University and a Juris Doctor from the University at Buffalo Law School. He is married to Martina Jacobs.

== Career ==
=== Early career ===
Before holding elected office, Jacobs served as deputy commissioner of environment and planning in the administration of Erie County Executive Joel Giambra. He also worked at the United States Department of Housing and Urban Development under then-HUD Secretary Jack Kemp.

Jacobs served on the Buffalo Public Schools board. He was elected in 2004 and reelected in 2009.

Jacobs serves on the Boards of Buffalo Place and the Freedom Station Coalition and was previously a board member at the Catholic Academy of West Buffalo and the Olmsted Parks Conservancy.

On April 19, 2006, Governor George Pataki appointed Jacobs New York secretary of state.

=== Erie County Clerk ===
In 2011, Jacobs was elected Erie County clerk. He was reelected to the post in 2014.

=== New York State Senate ===
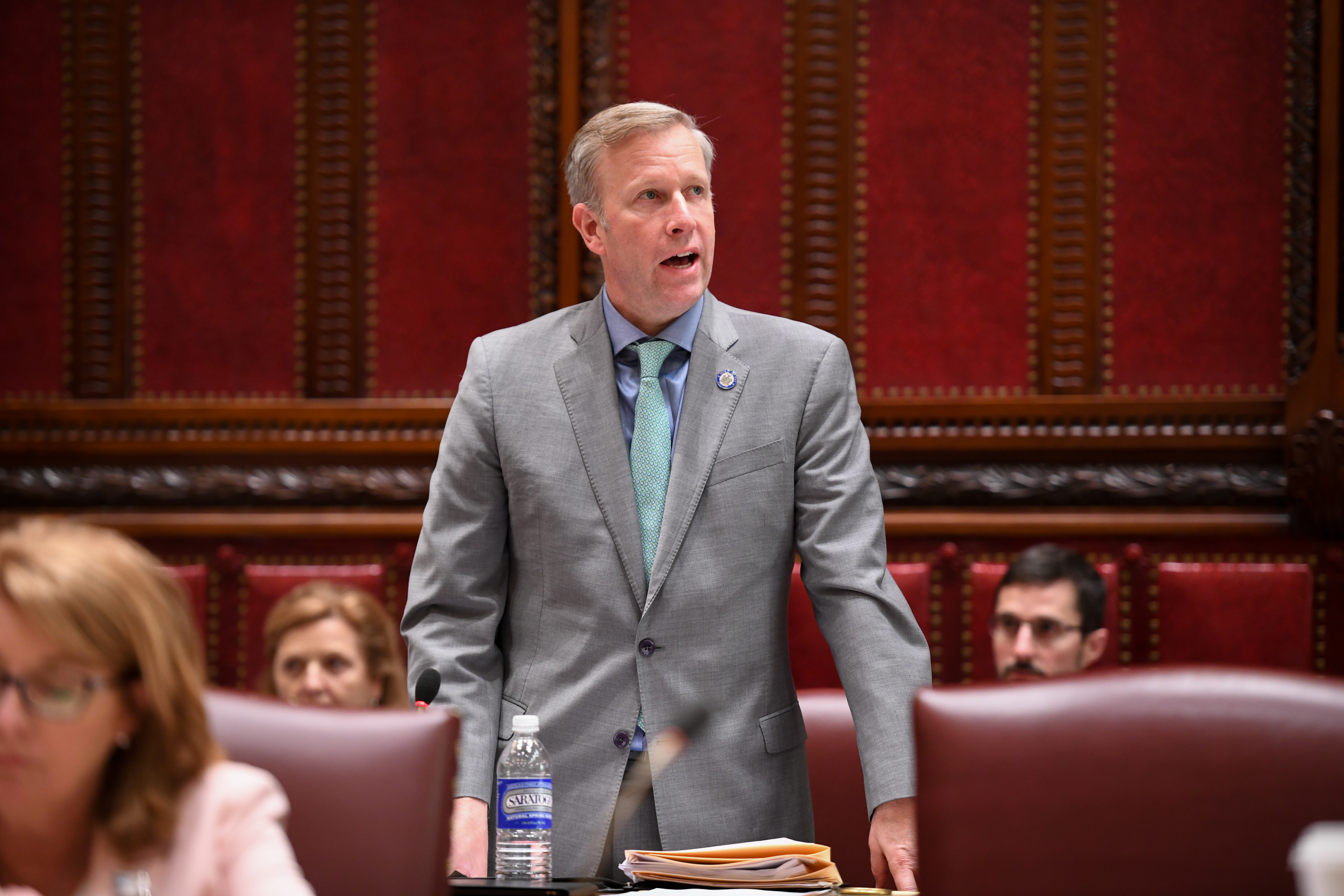
Jacobs speaking at a Senate session at the New York State Capitol

In February 2006, Jacobs was the Republican nominee in a special election for a State Senate seat representing Buffalo and Niagara Falls. He lost to Democratic nominee Marc Coppola.

On November 8, 2016, Jacobs defeated Democratic nominee Amber Small for the 60th district seat. The district was formerly represented by Democrat Marc Panepinto. The campaigns were rare for their lack of rancor on the part of either candidate.

Jacobs was reelected in 2018. He resigned on July 20, 2020, after being elected to Congress. Democrat Sean Ryan was later elected to succeed him.

== U.S. House of Representatives ==
=== Elections ===
==== 2020 special ====
In May 2019, Jacobs announced that he would run for New York's 27th congressional district in the 2020 elections. He initially planned to challenge incumbent Chris Collins in the Republican primary, but Collins resigned in October 2019 and pleaded guilty to insider trading charges.

Jacobs defeated Nate McMurray, 50.7%-45.6%, in a special election on June 23, 2020, for the balance of Collins's term and was sworn in as a member of Congress on July 21, 2020.

==== 2020 general ====
On the day of the special election, he also won a three-way Republican primary for the general election on November 3, in which he went on to win a full term by defeating McMurray a second time.

=== Tenure ===
In January 2021, Jacobs objected to the certification of the 2020 U.S. presidential election results in Congress, basing his decision on what The New York Times called "spurious allegations of widespread voter fraud". Jacobs's vote came shortly after the 2021 storming of the United States Capitol. On January 10, seven members of the New York State legislature signed an open letter calling on Jacobs to resign.

On January 13, Jacobs voted against both articles of impeachment in the second impeachment of President Donald Trump. On February 4, he joined 10 other Republican House members voting with all voting Democrats to strip Representative Marjorie Taylor Greene of her House Education and Labor Committee, and House Budget Committee assignments in response to controversial political statements she had made.

On May 19, 2021, Jacobs was one of 35 Republicans who joined all Democrats in voting to approve legislation to establish the January 6 commission meant to investigate the storming of the U.S. Capitol.

In September 2021, Forbes reported that Jacobs had violated the Stop Trading on Congressional Knowledge (STOCK) Act of 2012, a federal transparency and conflict-of-interest law, by failing to properly disclose 13 securities trades worth more than $356,000. In September 2022, Business Insider reported that Jacobs had again violated the STOCK Act when he failed to properly disclose 43 additional securities trades worth between $456,043 and $1.415 million.

On May 22, 2022, as a result of sanctions imposed by the United States in response to the Russian invasion of Ukraine, Jacobs was one of 963 Americans permanently banned from entering Russia.

On May 28, 2022, during a press conference on the Buffalo shooting and the Robb Elementary School shooting, Jacobs said he would vote for bills banning assault weapons and "raising the minimum age for some gun purchases to 21", explaining that the Buffalo shooting had "been a profoundly impactful event for me" and that he had rethought his stance on guns. Jacobs was endorsed by the NRA Political Victory Fund during his 2020 congressional run, at the time saying he was honored to receive the endorsement and vowing to serve as an "ally and fighter" for gun owners in western New York. Subsequently, Jacobs was admonished by some Republican politicians for his remarks, and Carl Paladino, the Republican nominee for governor in 2010, said he would consider challenging Jacobs for reelection in the Republican primary. On June 3, 2022, Jacobs ended his reelection campaign. He would have been running in a district almost entirely new to him; his old seat had been eliminated in redistricting, with most of its territory merged with the Southern Tier-based 23rd district.

On July 19, 2022, Jacobs and 46 other Republican Representatives voted for the Respect for Marriage Act, which would codify the right to same-sex marriage in federal law.

On July 29, 2022, Jacobs and one other Republican, Brian Fitzpatrick of Pennsylvania, joined the Democrats in voting for a bill banning assault weapons.

In 2022, Jacobs was one of 39 Republicans to vote for the Merger Filing Fee Modernization Act of 2022, an antitrust package that would crack down on corporations for anti-competitive behavior.

=== Committee assignments ===
- Committee on Agriculture
- Committee on the Budget
- Committee on Education and Labor

=== Caucus memberships ===
- Republican Governance Group
- Republican Main Street Partnership
- Republican Study Committee

== Notes ==
Political offices
Preceded by Frank Milano; Acting	Secretary of State of New York; 2006–2007	Succeeded by Lorraine Cortés-Vázquez
U.S. House of Representatives
Preceded by Chris Collins	Member of the U.S. House of Representatives from New York's 27th congressional district 2020-2023	Constituency abolished
U.S. order of precedence (ceremonial)
Preceded by Max Rose as Former U.S. Representative	Order of precedence of the United States as Former U.S. Representative	Succeeded by Mondaire Jones as Former U.S. Representative
