= Chris Collins (New York politician) =

American politician (born 1950)

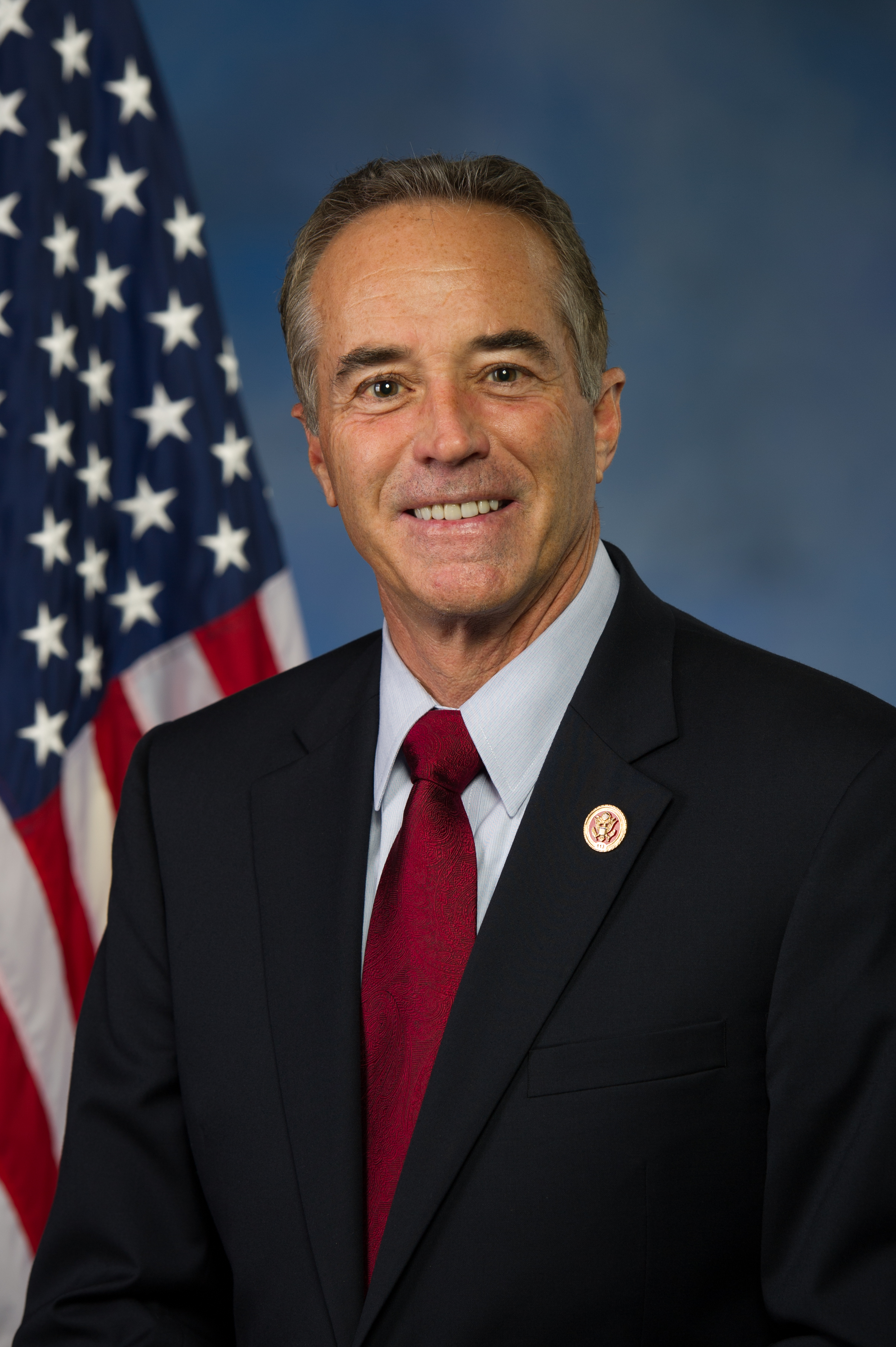
- Official portrait, 2013

Member of the U.S. House of Representatives from New York's 27th district
- In office January 3, 2013 – October 1, 2019
- Preceded by: Kathy Hochul (redistricted)
- Succeeded by: Chris Jacobs

7th Executive of Erie County
- In office January 1, 2008 – December 31, 2011
- Preceded by: Joel Giambra
- Succeeded by: Mark Poloncarz

Personal details
- Born: Christopher Carl Collins; May 20, 1950 (age 76) Schenectady, New York, U.S.
- Party: Republican
- Spouse: Mary Collins
- Children: 3
- Education: North Carolina State University (BS); University of Alabama, Birmingham (MBA)
- Criminal information
- Status: Pardoned
- Criminal charge: Insider trading
- Penalty: Sentenced to 2 years

Christopher Carl Collins (born May 20, 1950) is an American politician, pardoned felon, and businessman. He is a member of the Republican Party.

Collins served as president and CEO of Nuttall Gear Corporation, located in Niagara Falls, New York. In 2007, he was elected as county executive of Erie County, New York. He held that position for one term and was defeated in his 2011 bid for re-election. Collins was elected U.S. representative for New York's 27th congressional district in 2012, defeating incumbent Kathy Hochul. In 2016, Collins became the first sitting U.S. representative to endorse Donald Trump for president of the United States; he served on Trump's first presidential transition team.

Collins and his son, Cameron Collins, were arrested by the FBI on August 8, 2018, and charged with insider trading and making false statements. Three days later, Collins announced that he was suspending his bid for a fourth term in Congress; however, on September 17, 2018, he resumed his re-election campaign. Collins was narrowly re-elected to Congress on November 6, 2018. On October 1, 2019, he resigned from Congress and pleaded guilty to insider trading and lying to the FBI (both felonies). Collins began serving a 26-month prison sentence in October 2020. He was pardoned by President Trump on December 22, 2020.

In 2026, Collins ran for the U.S. House of Representatives in Florida's 19th congressional district and finished fifth in the Republican primary.

== Early life and education ==
Collins was born in 1950 in Schenectady, New York, the son of Constance (Messier) and Gerald Edward Collins. Collins moved around the country with his family, as his father was transferred several times by General Electric. Collins graduated from Hendersonville High School in Hendersonville, North Carolina, in 1968.

Collins earned a Bachelor of Science in Mechanical Engineering from North Carolina State University, where he was a member of the Sigma Pi fraternity, in 1972. He earned a master's degree in business administration from the University of Alabama at Birmingham in 1975.

Collins was inducted into the North Carolina State University Mechanical and Aerospace Engineering Department Hall of Fame in November 2015.

== Business career ==
Collins worked as a mechanical engineer at Westinghouse Electric. He served as president and CEO of Nuttall Gear Corporation located in Niagara Falls, New York. Nuttall Gear was a 1983 leveraged buyout of the Westinghouse Electric Gear Division located in Buffalo, New York. In 1997, Collins sold Nuttall to Colfax Corporation, based in Annapolis, Maryland.

== Erie County Executive ==
=== Elections ===
Collins ran for Erie County Executive in 2007 on a platform of smaller county government, lower taxes and Six Sigma. His campaign slogan was "Elect a Chief Executive, not a Chief Politician." Collins defeated Democrat James P. Keane, the deputy county executive of the Dennis Gorski administration, with 63% of the vote; his win was considered an upset.

On November 8, 2011, Collins lost his bid for re-election in a race that he was predicted to win. He was defeated by Democratic candidate Mark Poloncarz, the Erie County comptroller. In a county with 140,000 more Democrats than Republicans, Collins won 39 of the 44 municipalities. Poloncarz won the five remaining municipalities, including the City of Buffalo, by a margin of 81% to 19%.

=== Tenure ===
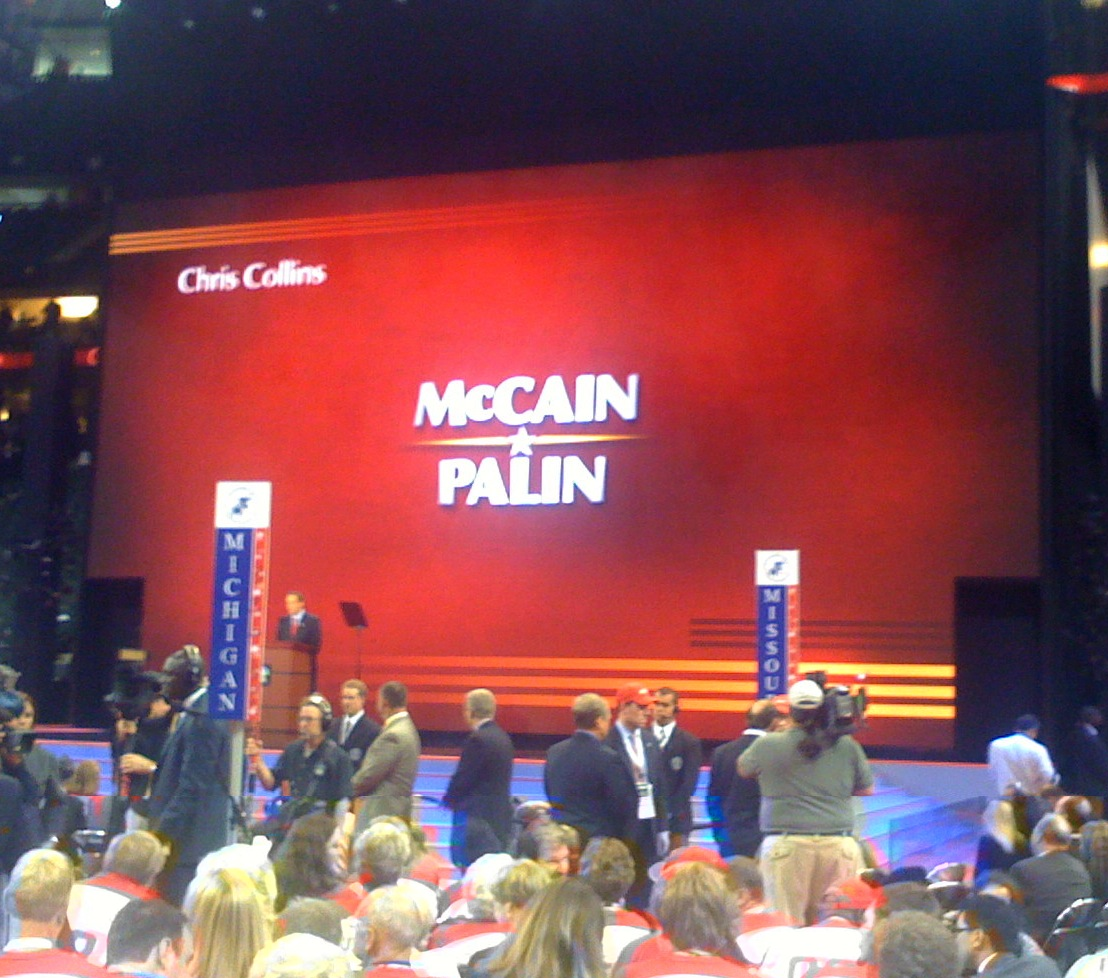
Collins speaking at the 2008 Republican National Convention

When Collins became Erie County executive, he inherited from his Republican predecessor, Joel Giambra, a nearly bankrupt county that had state-imposed fiscal control with a budget of $1.2 billion.

Collins spoke for three minutes at the 2008 Republican National Convention on September 3, 2008. By June 2009, the state-imposed strict oversight of the Erie County budget ended.

Collins recruited a Six Sigma Master Black Belt from the University at Buffalo who had previously worked as an executive at Delphi to implement Lean Six Sigma across all county departments under the direction of the county executive to improve efficiency and reduce costs. The position's $115,000 salary plus associated costs was funded by a grant of taxpayer money from the Erie County Control Board.

In October 2009, Collins compared New York State Assembly Speaker Sheldon Silver (who is Jewish) to Adolf Hitler, Napoleon, and the antichrist. Collins later apologized for his comments.

Collins sued the county so that he could unilaterally increase the county attorney's salary. The State Supreme Court judge presiding over the case ruled in favor of Collins and awarded the higher salary to the incoming county attorney.

Collins was sued by the United States Department of Justice for repeated civil rights violations of prisoners held in county facilities, including juveniles and prisoners with developmental disabilities. The Department of Justice and Erie County co-signed a stipulated settlement of dismissal in August 2011. He was also sued by the County Legislature for refusing to issue payments to Erie Community College that had been included in the county's budget.

As county executive, Collins created the Brighter Future Fund, donating his county salary to local non-profit organizations for the first 18 months of his tenure.

In February 2008, Erie County experienced a potential Hepatitis A emergency when an infected employee handled produce at a popular supermarket. Over the course of several days, the county vaccinated and inoculated 10,000 people to protect the public.

In January 2010, two Republican members of the New York State Assembly (including Republican Assemblyman Joseph Errigo), claimed that Collins had behaved inappropriately at Gov. David Paterson's State of the State address. According to the two assemblymembers, the event was crowded, and Collins made the following comment to a female attendee: "I'm sure if you offer someone a lap dance you can find a place to sit." Collins denied making the comment, and claimed that there was a "political smear campaign" going on against him.

During his lame duck period as Chief Executive, Collins proposed spending $6 million to upgrade housing for polar bears at Buffalo Zoo at the same time as he proposed to lay off 155 workers.

== U.S. House of Representatives ==
=== Elections ===
==== 1998 ====
In 1998, Collins challenged 24-year incumbent Democratic U.S. Congressman John J. LaFalce in New York's 29th congressional district. During the campaign, Collins was one of the first congressional candidates to call for President Bill Clinton's resignation in the wake of the Monica Lewinsky scandal. LaFalce touted his record of bringing home the bacon and defeated Collins by a margin of 58% to 41%.

==== 2012 ====
After losing his county executive re-election campaign in 2011, Collins initially ruled out a future bid for elected office. In January 2012, he was reported to be considering running for Congress and on March 25, 2012, Collins announced he was running in New York's newly drawn 27th Congressional District. The district had previously been the 26th District, and had long been a Republican bastion. However, Democratic Erie County Clerk Kathy Hochul won the seat in a May 2011 special election.

On June 26, 2012, Collins won the Republican primary, defeating Iraq War veteran David Bellavia by a margin of 60%–40%. Collins had the Republican and Conservative party lines for the November general election and defeated Hochul 51%–49%, a difference of 4,312 votes.

==== 2014 ====
Collins won re-election to a second term by defeating Democratic opponent Jim O'Donnell 72%–28%.

==== 2016 ====
Collins won re-election to a third term by defeating Democratic opponent Diana K. Kastenbaum 220,885 (67.7%) to 107,832 (32.3%).

==== 2018 ====
On August 11, following his arrest on federal charges of insider trading, Collins announced that he was suspending his reelection campaign; he added that he intended to serve out the balance of his term. Under New York election law, Collins would remain on the ballot for the November election unless he died, accepted a nomination for a different office, moved out of state, or was disqualified. According to CNN, Republican officials considered nominating him for a town clerk position; this move would allow Collins to be removed from the ballot and replaced with a different candidate. In either case, the eight Republican county chairs in the district would then select a replacement in a vote weighted by county population. Twelve Republicans were mentioned as potential replacements for Collins on the general election ballot.

On September 17, 2018, Collins reversed his decision about the upcoming election, stating that he would remain on the ballot and campaign for another term in office.

Collins was re-elected by a much narrower margin than he had been in prior years, defeating Democrat Nate McMurray, 49.1% to 48.8%.

=== Tenure ===
==== 113th Congress ====
Collins was sworn in on January 3, 2013. Prior to taking the oath of office, House Republican leadership appointed him to serve on both the Agriculture and Small Business committees in the 113th Congress. Soon after taking office, House Small Business Committee Chairman Sam Graves tapped Collins to chair the subcommittee on Healthcare and Technology.

On March 20, 2014, Collins chaired a field hearing, titled Expanding Broadband Access and Capabilities to Small Businesses in Rural New York. This field hearing was held at the Orleans County Legislature in Albion, New York, examining access to broadband in rural communities, and the role of the federal government in expanding these capabilities to small businesses. Following the field hearing, Collins hosted a roundtable discussion with local community leaders to continue the discussion on the importance of access to broadband in rural communities.

In announcing his committee assignments, Collins said one of his top goals as a member of Congress would be to work with his colleagues to pass a new Farm Bill. On May 15, 2013, Collins voted to approve the 2013 Farm Bill. On January 29, 2014, Collins voted to approve the Conferenced Farm Bill, known as the Agricultural Act of 2014. President Obama signed the 5 year Agricultural Act of 2014 into law on February 7, 2014.

In response to a proposal by New York State Governor Andrew Cuomo to provide state prison inmates with a publicly financed college education, Collins introduced the Kids Before Cons Act in February 2014. The bill would prohibit states from using federal funding for the purpose of providing a college degree to convicted criminals. Collins called the Governor's proposal an insult to law-abiding taxpayers who are struggling to put themselves or their children through college. Collins' bill would allow federal dollars to be used for GED and working training programs in prisons and correctional facilities. Cuomo later abandoned his proposal to use public money to fund his initiative.

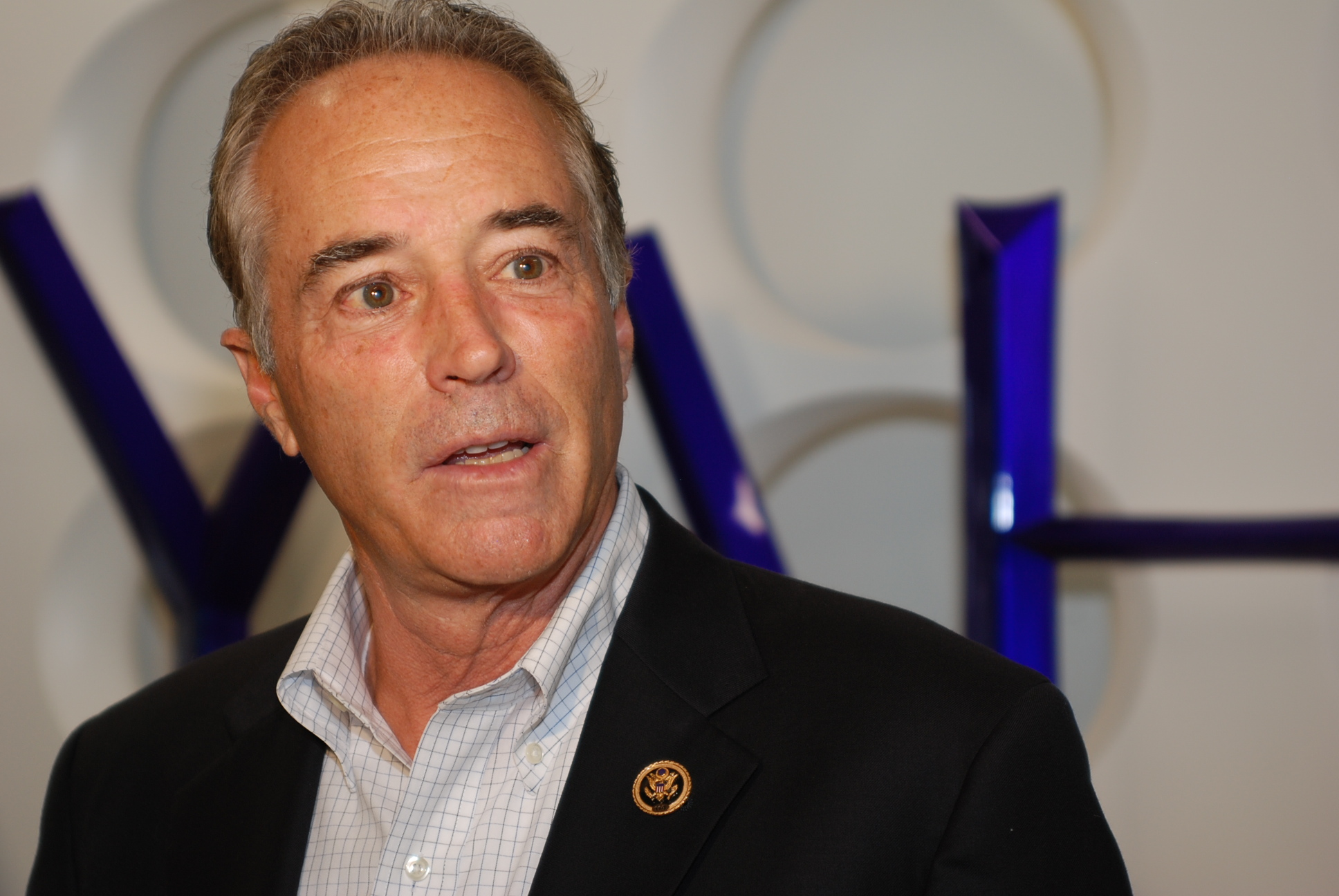
Collins during a visit to a Yahoo facility in Lockport, New York, in 2015

Committee assignments

- Committee on Agriculture
  - Subcommittee on General Farm Commodities and Risk Management
  - Subcommittee on Horticulture, Research, Biotechnology, and Foreign Agriculture
- Committee on Small Business
  - Subcommittee on Health and Technology (chair)
  - Subcommittee on Investigations, Oversight and Regulations
- Committee on Science, Space and Technology
  - Subcommittee on Research and Technology
  - Subcommittee on Space

==== 114th Congress ====
In the 114th Congress, Collins served on the House Energy and Commerce Committee. He stated his priorities on the Energy and Commerce Committee would be securing American energy independence, ensuring companies at the Buffalo Niagara Medical Campus receive a fair amount of funding in the competitive grants offered by the National Institutes of Health, continuing oversight of the government's approval for new drugs and medical treatments, and increasing access to broadband Internet service in rural areas.

Committee assignments

- Committee on Energy and Commerce
  - Subcommittee on Communications and Technology
  - Subcommittee on Health
  - Subcommittee on Oversight and Investigations

==== 115th Congress ====
On June 14, 2017, a left-wing domestic terrorist shot several GOP Congress members who were training for an annual Washington DC charity game that pits Democrats versus Republicans. Collins blamed Democrats for the attack, saying, "I can only hope that the Democrats do tone down the rhetoric. The rhetoric has been outrageous in the anger directed at Donald Trump." Shortly after making that comment, Collins noted that it was important for everyone, including himself, to tone down partisan rhetoric and "recognize that we are all one country and all proud Americans." Collins also vowed to start carrying a gun with him "from this day forward."

On August 8, 2018, following his arrest by the FBI for wire fraud, conspiracy to commit securities fraud, seven counts of securities fraud, and lying to the FBI, Collins was stripped of all congressional committee assignments by Speaker of the House Paul Ryan. Ryan also called for the House Ethics Committee to look into the allegations, saying: “Insider trading is a clear violation of the public trust.”

Committee assignments

Collins served on the following committees before being removed by House Speaker Paul Ryan in the wake of Collins' indictment on insider trading charges:

- Committee on Energy and Commerce
  - Subcommittee on Communications and Technology
  - Subcommittee on Health
  - Subcommittee on Oversight and Investigations

==== 116th Congress ====
Although Collins was re-elected in 2018, the Republicans adopted new caucus rules that barred Congressmen from serving on any committees if they are indicted for felonies. The rule was aimed at Collins and another Republican who was reelected while under felony indictment, Duncan D. Hunter of California.

In August 2019, Collins was listed as the 13th wealthiest member of Congress, with a net worth of $43.5 million.

==== Resignation ====
Collins submitted his resignation from Congress on September 30, 2019. It became official on October 1 after it was presented on the floor of the US House of Representatives. That same day, Collins appeared at a Manhattan federal courthouse and pleaded guilty to insider trading and lying to the FBI.

=== Political positions ===
==== Donald Trump ====
After initially endorsing Jeb Bush in the 2016 presidential election and donating money to a Bush-aligned SuperPAC, Collins endorsed Donald Trump for president when Bush dropped out of the race. Collins endorsed Trump on February 24, 2016, becoming the first sitting member of Congress to endorse him. He cited shared pasts in business and a need for businessmen in the White House as having influenced his decision. On July 18, Collins seconded Trump's nomination at the 2016 Republican National Convention. According to The New York Times, Collins is "one of Donald Trump’s earliest and most ardent supporters".

Following the 2016 election, Collins served on Trump's presidential transition team. On November 28, 2016, Collins made strongly negative remarks about Mitt Romney, who was being considered by President-elect Trump for the position of Secretary of State. On the TV show New Day, Collins said, "What do I know about Mitt Romney? I know that he's a self-serving egomaniac who puts himself first, who has a chip on his shoulder, and thinks that he should be president of the United States."

On February 10, 2017, Collins told Chris Cuomo on CNN's New Day that elected officials should not have to release their respective tax histories. This comment was made in response to the ongoing controversy concerning Trump's refusal to release his tax forms.

==== Health care ====
On May 4, 2017, Collins voted in favor of repealing the Patient Protection and Affordable Care Act (Obamacare) and to pass the American Health Care Act. Collins made headlines for admitting he had not read the full health care bill before voting. In an interview with a Buffalo News reporter, Collins admitted that he was unaware but unconcerned that New York would lose $3 billion worth of federal funds annually under the AHCA, by losing New York's Essential Health Plan, an optional ACA program that provided low-cost health insurance to thousands of "low- and middle-income people who d[id]n't qualify for Medicaid", to which Collins responded, "No. [I was not aware] But it doesn't surprise me for you to tell me that there were two states in the nation that were taking advantage of some other waiver program and New York was one of the two states."

In an interview in The Batavian on June 24, 2012, Collins said: "People now don't die from prostate cancer, breast cancer and some of the other things. The fact of the matter is, our healthcare today is so much better, we're living so much longer, because of innovations in drug development, surgical procedures, stents, implantable cardiac defibrillators, neural stimulators – they didn't exist 10 years ago." In response, Elise Foley of The Huffington Post wrote, "An estimated 577,190 people in the United States will die from cancer this year, including about 39,920 deaths from breast cancer and 28,170 from prostate cancer", citing data from the American Cancer Society.

Artvoice wrote, "The implantable cardiac defibrillator and neural stimulators, or TENS devices, were both invented and patented in the late 60s or early 70s; therefore, they existed '10 years ago'".

==== Law enforcement ====
In response to a proposal by New York State Governor Andrew Cuomo to provide state prison inmates with a publicly financed college education, Collins introduced the Kids Before Cons Act in February 2014. The bill would prohibit states from using federal funding for the purpose of providing a college degree to convicted criminals. Collins called the Governor's proposal an insult to law-abiding taxpayers who are struggling to put themselves or their children through college. Collins' bill would allow federal dollars to be used for GED and working training programs in prisons and correctional facilities. Cuomo later abandoned his proposal to use public money to fund his initiative.

Collins supported Donald Trump's May 9, 2017, firing of FBI Director James Comey, saying "The Director of the FBI serves at the pleasure of the President. I respect President Trump's decision at the recommendation of the Attorney General."

==== National security ====
Collins supported President Donald Trump's 2017 Executive Order 13769 restricting immigration from seven Muslim-majority countries. He stated that "I get a little frustrated with the folks who don't like Trump trying to make something into something it's not. So I'm just disappointed that we can't have a true and honest debate without someone inflaming the situation and claiming there's religious overtones."

==== Taxes ====
Collins was one of only two House members from New York state (along with Tom Reed) to support the provision in Republican tax overhaul bill introduced November 2, 2017, eliminating personal deductions for state income taxes on federal tax forms. In response New York Governor Andrew Cuomo labeled the two lawmakers "the Benedict Arnolds of their time", claiming that the loss of the deduction would cost New York State taxpayers nearly $15 billion and do grave damage to the state. Collins said that under Cuomo, New York is the highest-taxed, most regulated, least business-friendly state in the nation and urged Cuomo to cut the state's budget. Asked if his donors were pleased with the House's tax reform plan so far, Collins said, "My donors are basically saying 'get it done or don't ever call me again.'"

== Legal problems ==
=== Background ===
In August 2016, Collins became the largest shareholder in a company called Innate Immunotherapeutics. In May 2017, House ethics investigators "began probing Collins for his role in recruiting investors to buy stock in Innate Immunotherapeutics after several complaints were filed." Members of Congress are explicitly barred from trading stocks using insider information. In October 2017, the Office of Congressional Ethics (OCE) said they had "substantial reason" to believe that Collins had improperly used his public office to benefit Innate, and had forwarded nonpublic information to other investors. The OCE said Collins sent nonpublic information to investors about drug trials and that he visited the National Institutes of Health to discuss a drug's clinical trial, violating House ethics rules. The House Ethics Committee did appoint a subcommittee to continue investigating Collins' case, but deferred action at the request of DOJ. On August 8, 2018, the U.S. Securities and Exchange Commission filed a complaint in federal court on Collins and two other defendants for "illegal insider trading".

=== Arrest ===
According to the federal government, on June 22, 2017, the CEO of Innate Immunotherapeutics sent an email to the company's board of directors, including Collins. The e-mail explained that an important drug trial for the company had failed. Collins allegedly received this news while attending a picnic at the White House and, upon seeing the email, immediately phoned his son and instructed him to sell shares in the company. According to the allegations, the sale allowed Collins and his family to avoid around $570,000 in losses. The shares eventually dropped around 90% once news about the drug trial became public.

On August 8, 2018, Collins, his son Cameron, and the father of Cameron's fiancée, Stephen Zarsky, were arrested by the FBI and charged with wire fraud, conspiracy to commit securities fraud, securities fraud, and lying to the FBI. Later that day, Speaker of the US House of Representatives Paul Ryan announced that he had removed Collins from his position on the House Energy and Commerce Committee. He also referred the matter to the House Ethics Committee.

=== Guilty plea and sentencing ===
On September 30, 2019, it was reported that Collins would change his plea to guilty. On October 1, 2019, Collins appeared at a Manhattan federal courthouse and pleaded guilty to insider trading and lying to the FBI; these offenses are felonies.

On December 9, 2019, Collins and the SEC agreed that Collins would "be permanently barred from acting as an officer or director of any public company". In January 2020, federal prosecutors recommended that Collins receive the maximum prison sentence, which amounted to nearly five years in prison.

On January 17, 2020, Judge Vernon S. Broderick sentenced Collins to 26 months in prison. He began serving his sentence on October 13, 2020, at Federal Prison Camp, Pensacola.

December 2020 pardon granted by Donald Trump

=== Pardon ===
Collins received a pardon from President Donald Trump on December 22, 2020.

== Florida congressional elections ==
=== 2024 ===
On July 2, 2023, in a text exchange with WGRZ reporter Scott Levin, Collins announced his candidacy for the seat representing Florida's 19th congressional district. Collins anticipated that Republican incumbent Rep. Byron Donalds would seek another office in the 2024 elections. However, Donalds sought re-election, was unchallenged in the 2024 primaries, and was re-elected to Congress in November 2024.

=== 2026 ===
In February 2025, Donalds announced his 2026 candidacy for governor of Florida. Collins was mentioned as a potential candidate to succeed him and in June 2025, Collins officially announced his congressional campaign. On an episode of the podcast The Financial Guys posted on August 30, Collins outlined his reasons for running for Congress again, saying that he was "lonely" and wanted to "reclaim his reputation".

== Personal life ==
As of 2018, Collins and his wife, Mary, had three children and three grandchildren.

Collins is Roman Catholic.

Political offices
Preceded by Joel Giambra	Executive of Erie County; 2008–2011	Succeeded by Mark Poloncarz
U.S. House of Representatives
Preceded by Brian Higgins	Member of the U.S. House of Representatives from New York's 27th congressional district 2013–2019	Succeeded by Chris Jacobs
U.S. order of precedence (ceremonial)
Preceded by Chris Gibson as Former U.S. Representative	Order of precedence of the United States as Former U.S. Representative	Succeeded by Heath Shuler as Former U.S. Representative
