= Timeline of artificial intelligence risks in global finance =

Dynamic timeline of 2025 artificial intelligence risks in global finance

The following article is a broad timeline of the course of events related to artificial intelligence risks in global finance.

The AI boom has led to concerns including the existential risk from artificial intelligence, as the uptake on applications of artificial intelligence increases. By late 2025, global finance and artificial intelligence were "deeply intertwined". A June 2025 Menlo Ventures report raised concerns about the sustainability of future revenue and long-term profitability of AI, given the relatively low rate of consumer monetization.

== 2017 ==
- 30 NovemberThe New York Times said that new AI reports by McKinsey & Company, the National Bureau of Economic Research, and an AI Index created by university researchers, indicated an early AI boom. The Index built on a project—"The One Hundred Year Study on Artificial Intelligence" launched in 2014.

== 2018 ==
- 2018 was a year of incremental AI growth in finance.

== 2021 ==
22 October 2021 IMF economists El Bachir Boukherouaa and Ghiath Shabsigh, with six co-authors, published Powering the Digital Economy: Opportunities and Risks of Artificial Intelligence in Finance (IMF Departmental Paper No. 2021/024). The paper identified herding — where a small number of AI model providers supplying uniform risk assessments across institutions could drive the buildup of systemic risk — as a distinct concern. It further warned that AI could automate and accelerate procyclicality in credit underwriting in ways that obscured the buildup of risk, and that in a tail-risk event miscalibrated algorithms could amplify and spread shocks faster than human intervention could respond. Other risk categories examined included embedded bias, model opacity, cybersecurity, and data privacy.

== 2022 ==
- 30 November The release of ChatGPT by OpenAI became the catalyst for an artificial intelligence boom that continues to remake the global economy.
- According to a European Central Bank report, public interest in AI increased rapidly as evidenced with rising Google searches, AI jobs, models, patents, and innovations since late 2022. At that time Europe led the US in the size of its AI workforce.

== 2023 ==
- In their 2023 report "Generative Artificial Intelligence in Finance: Risk Considerations" published by the International Monetary Fund (IMF), economists Ghiath Shabsigh and El Bachir Boukherouaa drew attention to oversight gaps and the need for regulations. The report explores the risks posed by using generative artificial intelligence (GenAI) systems in the financial sector including "broader risks to financial stability."

== 2024 ==
- January 12 In January 2024 Bloomberg's published its list of the "Magnificent Seven" Big Tech companies on the stock market based on their strength, size and market capitalization:Apple, Microsoft, Alphabet (Google), Amazon, Meta Platforms (Facebook), Nvidia, and Tesla.
- 21 June During the AI boom, Nvidia became the world's most valuable company, surpassing Microsoft, as its value increased to over US$4 trillion.
- In 2023 and 2024, the "Magnificent Seven" stocks were the primary drivers behind the increase in equity indexes, according to Reuters.

== 2025 ==
=== January ===
- 23 January President Donald Trump's AI policy was announced calling for United States global leadership in artificial intelligence. The Economist noted that this politic shift in which the United States seeks "global dominance" in AI includes trimming regulations and assisting in expansion of infrastructure and increase in number of AI workers. Governments of Gulf nations were also investing trillions of dollars in AI.
- 27 January Against the backdrop of a tech war between China and the United States over AI dominance, within days of the launch of China's free DeepSeek App, it was the most downloaded app in the United States, rising to the first place in the Apple app store. President Trump responded immediately, saying this "sudden rise" should be a "wake-up" call to the United States, and called on US companies to be more competitive.

=== June ===
- 26 June In their June 2025 report, Menlo Ventures estimated that only about 3% of consumers paid for artificial intelligence-related services, representing about $USD12 billion in annual spending. This is relatively low in contrast to the massive capital expenditure by AI infrastructure companies, which raises concerns about revenue sustainability and long-term profitability.

=== July ===
- 23 July The Trump administration launched the US AI Action Plan, positioning the United States in a high-stakes technological race with China for global dominance in artificial intelligence, emphasizing that neither nation can afford to fall behind due to the exponential nature of AI advancement. The plan, a new government website and policy speech called for accelerated AI adoption across federal agencies, and a number of initiatives to make is easier for AI infrastructure expansion, and other measures to ensure American leadership in AI standards. Some leading experts warned that the administration failed to provide sufficient regulations and safeguards for AI safety. Concerns were raised about the negative impacts of cuts to research funding and tightened visa policies for scientists, potentially undermining public trust and America's ability to compete internationally.

=== September ===
- 7 September The Economist cautioned that AI revenues are relatively modest compared to the high cost and investments in the creation of new data centers. Even Sam Altman, OpenAI CEO and one of the leading figures of the AI boom,, raised concerns about investors' outsized hopes for financial returns. At the same time, history has shown that new technologies, like railways and electricity, endured and spread after the initial hype faded.
- 12 September Economists warn that U.S. households' direct and indirect investments—mutual funds or retirement plans—in the stock market reached an unprecedented historically high level, now representing 45% of all financial assets, or about $USD51.2 trillion. Compared to the Dot-com bubble this represents a sharp increase in exposure. This makes U.S. households vulnerable to market downturns which in turn would result in decreasing consumer spending. U.S. household net worth rose to a record $176.3 trillion in the second quarter, an increase of $7.3 trillion since early 2025 and about $46 trillion higher than before the pandemic. Federal Reserve data attribute the surge primarily to gains in stock markets and housing values. However, the rise in wealth on paper coincided with increased household borrowing and growing government debt.
- 18 September Questions were being raised about how quickly the data centers, chips, servers, and GPUs assets of major AI companies will depreciate in value. Comparisons have been made to the Railway Mania in the aftermath of the stock market bubble where a valuable physical infrastructure remained standing, and the telecoms crash after the dot-com bubble which left fiber networks.
- 28 September There were warnings that record-high American stock ownership during the AI-fueled market boom is a red flag for systemic risk, as the current concentration in equities exceeds levels seen before the dot-com bubble burst in 2000, and could amplify the impact of any future stock market correction.

=== October ===
- 3 October In 2025 alone, venture capitalists invested almost $USD200 billion in the artificial intelligence sector.
- 29 October Nvidia was the first company in the world to be valued at US$5 trillion, largely due to AI demand and strategic partnerships with leading technology and AI firms. Nvidia's increase in value was "meteoric".

=== November ===
- 2 November Forbes reported that, since April, the 'Magnificent Seven' tech giants together contributed over 40% of the S&P 500's return, highlighting their outsized influence and the growing impact of AI on market valuations. CNN warned that while there is a current benefit to investors, with such a high concentration in the S&P 500, they are highly exposed to the fate of the Mag Seven.
- 2 November Globally there are 11,000 datacentres—huge campuses for AI infrastructure, including thousands of chips, GPUS, and servers. This represents a 500% increase over the last two decades. It is anticipated that $3USDtn more will be spent on increasing that number over the next two or three years.
- 5 November Concerns about the potential for a market bubble were raised as six of the AI-related Big Tech "Magnificent Seven"—that contribute to the AI boom—reported losing ground in the stock market. Global markets and artificial intelligence have become "deeply intertwined", according to a Reuters report.
  - As of November 2025, more than 50% of the 20 largest S&P firms were deeply exposed to AI. In contrast, in 2000, the 20 S&P 500 firms represented 39% of its total value only 11 of these companies were exposed to the internet. If AI fails to deliver strong returns on their investments, these top S&P firms would be significantly impacted, according to the Economist.
  - Analysts suggest that the AI market in 2025 may not behave like a traditional one, as investors are simultaneously aware of the risks and driven by the potential for outsized rewards. Leading AI labs may believe that the first company to achieve artificial general intelligence (AGI), when an AI system surpasses all human cognitive abilities and becomes capable of self-improvement—could dominate the future of technology and finance. While some have estimated that the potential value of such a breakthrough could be as high as $1.46 quadrillion, this figure is speculative and widely debated.

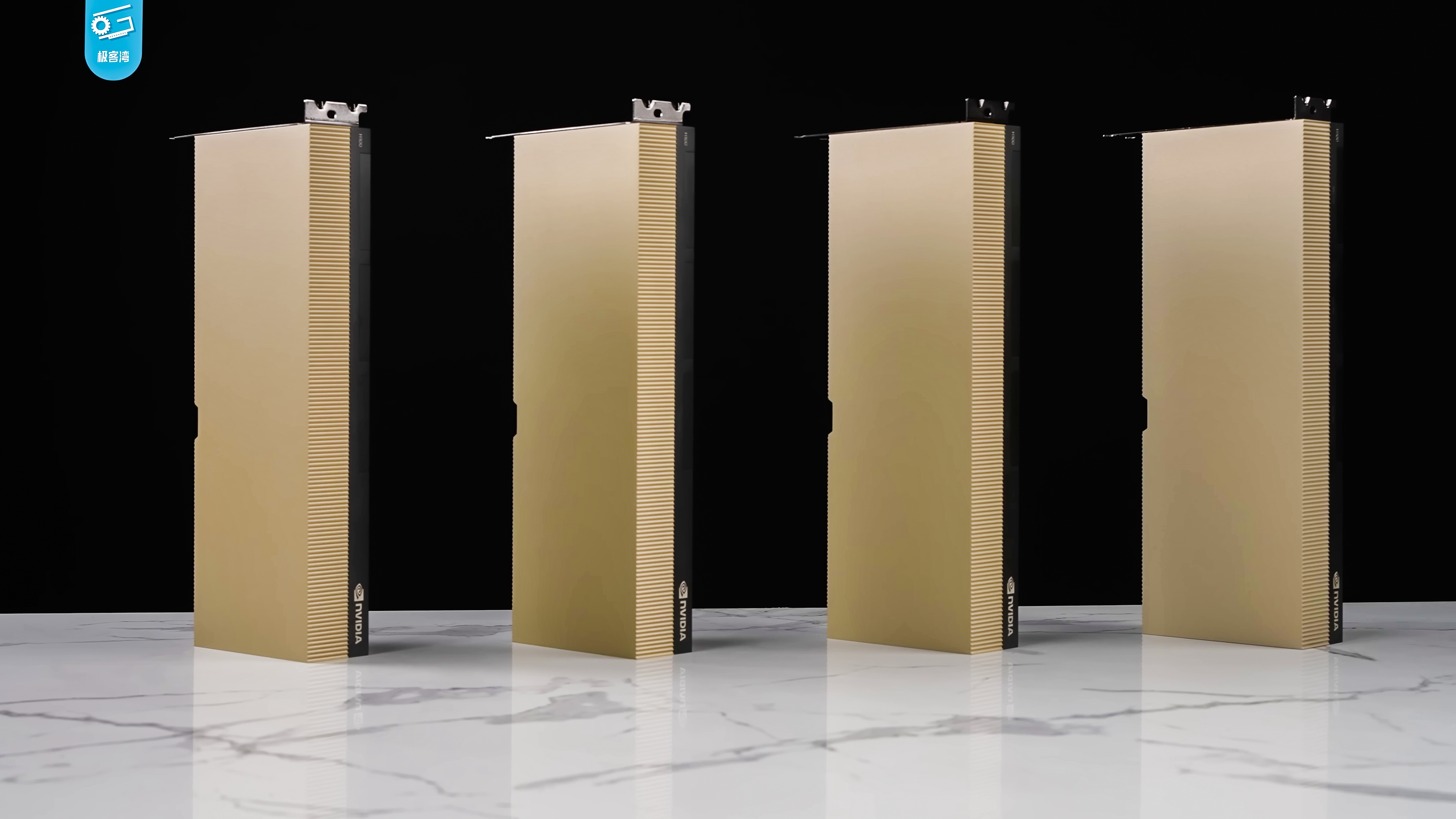
4 Nvidia H100 GPUs

- 5 November Bloomberg described Nvidia's H100 Hopper-Blackwell AI chips as the "King of AI chips". Nvidia dominates the AI chip market with over 78% of the market share because of both speed and cost. According to Business Insider, the technical superiority and widespread developer familiarity with Nvidia's platform resulted in H100 chips becoming the preferred choice for demanding AI workloads.
- 7 November Andrew Bailey, Governor of the Bank of England called attention to the risk to the market in light of the lack of certainty about future earnings in AI versus AI companies "very positive productivity contribution".
- 10 November The first report of the Forecasting Research institute's (FRI) Longitudinal Expert AI Panel (LEAP) was published, providing insights into the projected high-stakes impact of AI by 2030. The panel includes hundreds of leading experts from computer science, economics, and AI policy—including superforecasters. LEAP experts forecast that around 18% of work hours in the US will be assisted by generative AI by 2030, up sharply from approximately 2% in 2025. This reflects a major anticipated integration of AI technologies into daily work and productivity.
- 11 November By late fall 2025, these large AI-related tech companies, including Meta, Microsoft, Amazon, and Google, had begun using loans and financial instruments (special purpose vehicles (S.P.V.) and asset-backed securities (A.B.S.)) to obtain the capital they need for large investments in their new data centers and AI infrastructure. Elon Musk's xAI and Meta used S.P.V.s, rather than relying only on their own cash flow, to acquire tens of billions in debt for major investments. Citing the June Menlo report on low consumer interest in paid AI use combined with huge capital expenditure by large AI companies, a New York Times article cited growing concerns about revenue sustainability, long-term profitability, and the potential risk factor for credit markets, as tech firms take on increasing amounts of debt to finance acquisition of billions of dollars of Nvidia chips, for example.

=== December ===
- 10 December In October 2025, a workshop on “AI and financial stability” in the Financial Industry Forum on Artificial Intelligence II (FIFAI II), co‑hosted by the Office of the Superintendent of Financial Institutions, the Department of Finance Canada, the Bank of Canada, and the Global Risk Institute, brought together over 50 Canadian and international experts from the financial sector, regulators, academia, and business. An interim report dated 23 November 2025 stated that 44% of participants viewed autonomous or so-called agentic AI systems as the most likely current source of AI‑related systemic risk in finance.

== 2026 ==
- 12 January Moody's rating agency notes that as financial institutions make greater use of AI in their day‑to‑day operations, their exposure to cyber incidents and operational disruptions increases. Differing approaches such as the European Union’s AI Act and China’s licensing regime are likely to raise compliance costs and complicate the cross‑border deployment of AI systems.
- 26 January Analysts at the Bank for International Settlements caution that as firms invest heavily in AI infrastructure such as data centres, they increasingly rely on debt and private credit rather than traditional bank loans, shifting risks into more opaque parts of the financial system. They warn that this funding structure, combined with wider adoption of similar AI models and digital‑finance platforms, could intensify and speed up familiar financial‑stability risks. They argue that this may occur by increasing correlated behaviour, (Note: In this context, “correlated behaviour” refers to many market participants or institutions responding in similar ways to the same models, signals or shocks, increasing the likelihood of joint stress or losses.) contagion (Note: In finance, “contagion” commonly refers to the spread of market disturbances or stress from one institution, market segment or country to others, for example through balance‑sheet linkages, fire sales or shifts in risk sentiment.) and procyclicality (Note: "Procyclicality" describes financial dynamics that reinforce the ups and downs of the broader economy, such as when abundant credit and rising asset prices in booms encourage more risk‑taking, while tighter credit and falling prices in downturns lead to forced deleveraging and amplify stress in the financial system.) while making emerging vulnerabilities harder for supervisors to detect and manage. By March early signs of AI‑related stress in software‑exposed private credit portfolios, raised concerns without yet providing evidence of a full‑blown private credit crisis.
- 23 February Goldman Sachs chief economist Jan Hatzius stated that, despite large-scale investment in generative AI infrastructure, AI had contributed "basically zero" to U.S. GDP growth in 2025, challenging earlier claims that AI spending was a major driver of recent economic performance.
- 24 February CNBC and Reuters reported that Anthropic's new Claude AI legal plug-in—Claude Cowork—triggered a broad sell‑off in software and data providers, raising fears that AI could undercut key software business models and revenues. Because software firms are major borrowers in the roughly three‑trillion‑dollar private credit market, this AI‑driven shock to software valuations fed through to private credit lenders’ share prices and revived concerns that opaque, highly leveraged loans to AI‑exposed software companies could become a source of emerging credit risk in global finance.
- 26 February 2026 Analysts from Reuters warn that Nvidia’s AI chips are improving faster than the memory needed to support them, causing shortages and large price increases for that memory and fueling worries that memory suppliers will take a larger share of future profits, even as Nvidia's shares remain much more expensive than those of companies facing the same boom‑and‑bust risk in the AI market. Nvidia's basic business of making and selling chips is extremely profitable, with only about 25 cents of each sales dollar needed to cover the direct costs of producing its products. Nvidia is still very profitable, but these analysts caution that the real money might gradually shift toward the companies that control the scarce, critical High Bandwidth Memory (HBM) chips that AI systems depend on, such as South Korea's SK hynix.
- 28 February 2026 Another example of systemic risk is the way in which AI data‑centre boom has caused a global RAM shortage. Investment in AI data centers consumes much of the available memory‑chip supply, which has led to a global shortage of RAM and (HBM), according to CBC News. Only three firms—Samsung, SK Hynix, Micron—dominate RAM production. As of February both SK Hynix and Micron were already sold out of HBM for the rest of 2026. AI data‑center investment had absorbed so much RAM and HBM capacity that major electronics makers warned of higher prices and delays.
- 7 May 2026 The International Monetary Fund warned that advanced AI models had cut the time and cost needed to find and exploit vulnerabilities across banks, payment networks, and cloud providers, raising the risk that multiple institutions could be hit by the same flaw at once. The IMF said extreme cyber-incident losses could trigger funding strains, solvency concerns, and broader market disruption, and called for stronger international coordination and resilience standards.
- 23 July 2026 — The McKinsey Global Institute reports that 58 percent of global household wealth growth in 2025 came from paper wealth in asset values rather than real investment, and attributes a substantial share of the underlying U.S. equity appreciation to an AI-driven boom in "Magnificent Seven" technology stocks, which accounted for just over half of S&P 500 market-capitalization growth from 2021 to 2025; the report names a disappointing AI investment cycle as one path by which this paper wealth could unwind through a sharp valuation correction.
- 17 August Some analysts have attributed part of the 2026 rise in long-term sovereign bond yields to competition from record hyperscaler debt issuance. Bank of America economists described AI-related borrowing as "potentially crowding out long-end Treasury demand," and Nomura estimated that big technology companies' bond sales were equivalent to roughly a quarter of the US Treasury's net note and bond issuance to private investors in 2026, up from a much smaller share the previous year. Separately, a July 2026 Bank for International Settlements (BIS) working paper warned that the debt-funded scale of AI infrastructure investment resembled earlier speculative booms and could pose systemic financial-stability risks if AI revenue growth disappoints. Other strategists, including those at Goldman Sachs, have argued the effect has been limited — noting that AI-related borrowing makes up roughly a quarter of gross investment-grade bond issuance, yet borrowing costs for companies outside the sector stayed low without any unusual jump. They estimate the overall impact on interest rates at only a small fraction of a percentage point. A Reuters columnist has argued that the more significant driver of the borrowing-cost increase was the market's uneasy reaction to comments by new Federal Reserve Chair Kevin Warsh, whose remarks were seen as downplaying inflation risks despite inflation running above the Fed's target.
- 19 August Amid a wider global bond-market sell-off, the yield on 30-year US Treasury securities briefly rose above 5.3%, its highest level since 2007. Commentators linked the pressure on long-term yields partly to the combined supply of government debt and large corporate bond issues financing artificial intelligence data-centre construction. Amazon, Alphabet, Meta and Oracle had issued about $194 billion in bonds for such investment in 2026 through 7 July, according to Reuters. The Treasury Department subsequently said it would increase repurchases of longer-dated securities. Rising Treasury yields increase the U.S. government's borrowing costs and can also put upward pressure on rates for household and business borrowing, including mortgages and vehicle loans.
- 31 August 2026 Andrew Bailey, chair of the Financial Stability Board (FSB)—an international body headquartered in Basel, Switzerland, that monitors and makes recommendations about the global financial system—told G20 finance ministers and central bank governors that artificial intelligence's growing role in cyber risk had become the single greatest near-term threat to financial stability worldwide, arguing that AI could fundamentally reshape how quickly, how broadly, and how cheaply an attack could be carried out. He said many governments still lacked the regulatory tools needed to oversee the deployment of advanced AI systems, and warned that the financial sector's reliance on a handful of dominant technology firms risked eroding confidence throughout the system.
- 13 October The International Monetary Fund warned that a slowdown in AI investment or lower-than-expected profits could cause AI-related asset prices to fall, with effects on global markets. Its Global Financial Stability Report said that increased borrowing and investments concentrated in a small number of companies or sectors could make such a downturn worse, although financial markets remained resilient.
- 15 October The Financial Stability Board published 12 practices to help financial institutions adopt AI responsibly. The guidance covered management and accountability, human oversight, cybersecurity, and reliance on external AI providers. It aimed to help the financial system withstand disruptions.
- 20 November CBC News reported growing investor concern about the amounts AI companies were spending and whether their share prices were justified. AI-related shares were among those falling that day. During trading, the Nasdaq Composite dropped below its level at the start of the year, while the S&P 500 stood at least 10 per cent below its recent high.

== See also ==
- Applications of artificial intelligence
- AI boom
- Existential risk from artificial intelligence
- Statement on AI Risk
- Big Tech
- AI alignment
