= Garrett Motion =

American industrial company

Garrett Motion Inc.
- Formerly: Honeywell Turbo Technologies; Honeywell Transportation Systems; Garrett AiResearch's Industrial Division
- Company type: Public
- Traded as: Nasdaq: GTX
- Industry: Automotive
- Founded: 1954 as Garrett AiResearch's Industrial Division; 2018 as independent company
- Headquarters: Rolle, Switzerland
- Key people: Olivier Rabiller (President and CEO) Daniel Ninivaggi (Chairman of the Board)
- Products: Turbochargers
- Revenue: ▲US$3.6 billion (2021)
- Net income: ▲US $707 million (2021)
- Number of employees: 7,500 (2021)
- Website: www.garrettmotion.com

Garrett Motion Inc., formerly Honeywell Transportation Systems and Honeywell Turbo Technologies, is an American company primarily involved in engineering, development and manufacturing of turbochargers and related forced induction systems for ground vehicles from small passenger cars to large trucks and industrial equipment and construction machinery. It originated as part of Garrett AiResearch's Industrial Division in Phoenix, Arizona, in 1954, after which they entered a contract to provide 5,000 turbochargers for the Caterpillar mining vehicle. It manufactured turbochargers for railroads and commercial trucks. The business produced approximately $3.6 billion in revenue in 2021. Garrett Motion is also involved in motorsports providing turbochargers and forced induction systems, solutions and related equipment to racing teams and various forms of automobile racing and professional competitions. In 2004, the business became part of American industrial conglomerate Honeywell International, Inc., as their Transportation Systems division. In 2018, it was spun off to become an independent company under the Garrett Motion name with corporate headquarters in Rolle, Switzerland.

== History ==
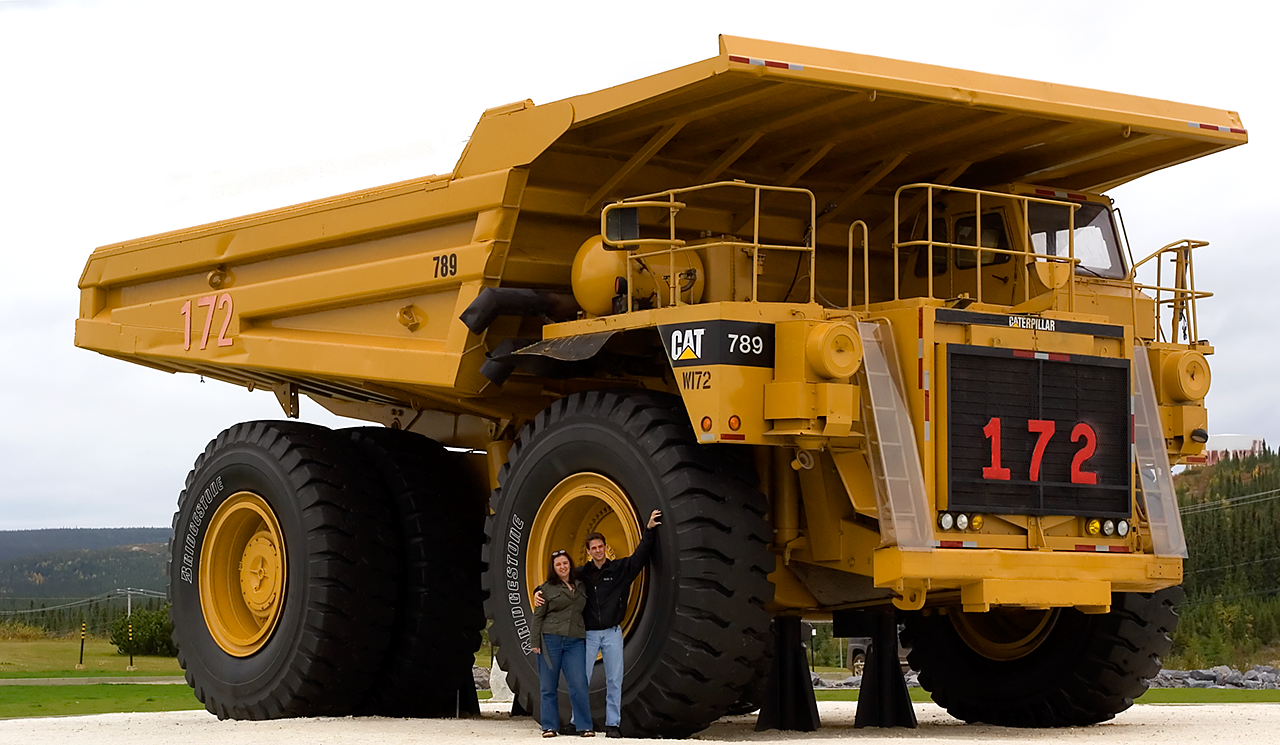
Garrett AiResearch formed AiResearch Industrial Division after getting an order to turbocharge 5,000 Caterpillar mining vehicles like the one depicted above.

John Clifford "Cliff" Garrett founded the Aircraft Tool and Supply Company in a one-room office in Los Angeles in 1936. In 1938, the company changed its name to Garrett Corporation, consolidating several companies into one with three divisions. The company produced aircraft turbochargers for the war effort in World War II, as well as avionics, environmental controls and other products.

In the 1950s, the city of Los Angeles and other municipalities started using turbochargers in their sewage purification operations. By 1952, 20,000 turbocharged engines were in use in the US. In order to explore applications of turbochargers for diesel engines, Garrett separated the turbocharger group from the gas turbine group on September 27, 1954, to form the AiResearch Industrial Division (AID).

The first T-15 Turbocharger was delivered to the Caterpillar Company in 1955. It was followed by an order for 5,000 production units, to be installed in the Caterpillar D9 tractor. The industrial division produced turbochargers for construction machinery, railroad locomotives, tractors, ships, power plants and oil pipeline pumping stations.

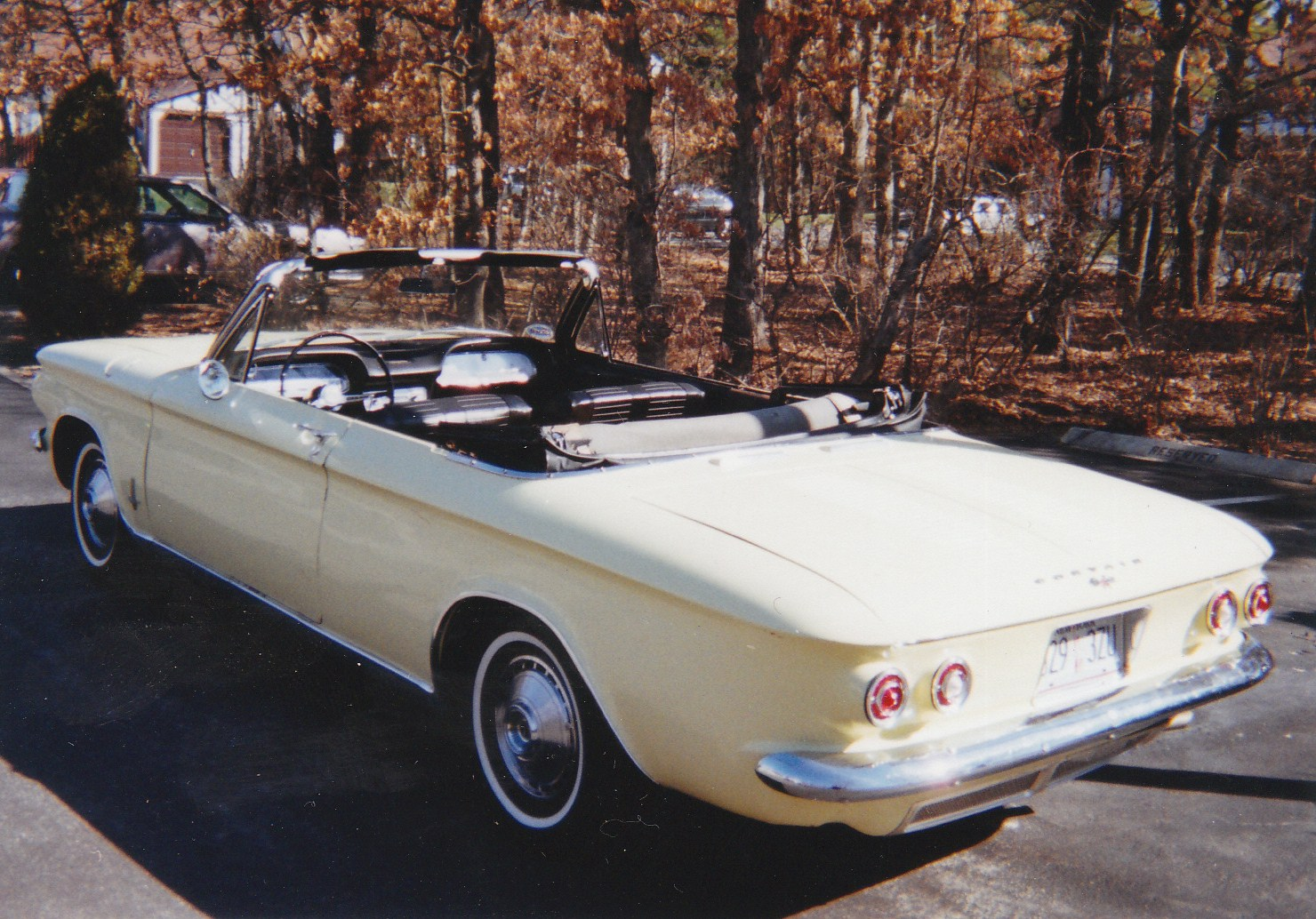
The Chevrolet Corvair Monza was one of the first turbocharged passenger vehicles. It was the sports model in the Corvair lineup.

The T11 automotive turbocharger developed in 1960 expanded turbos to commercial vehicles such as the heavy trucks produced by Mack Trucks, Volvo and Scania. The first turbocharged passenger cars were the Chevrolet Corvair Monza and the Oldsmobile Jetfire in 1962/1963. In the 1960s turbochargers were used in race-cars and sports cars, gaining an association with racing culture and auto-enthusiasts. Company founder Cliff Garrett's death in 1963 was followed by a hostile takeover threat by Curtiss-Wright Corporation. To avoid this, Garrett Corporation merged with Signal Oil and Gas Company in 1964. The combined company adopted the name The Signal Companies in 1968 before merging with Allied Corporation to become Allied-Signal Inc.

The oil crisis of the 1970s made federal regulators put pressure on car manufacturers to reduce exhaust emissions. By 1977 manufacturers introduced turbocharged cars in the US and Europe like the second generation Buick Regal and LeSabre sports coupe as well as European cars by Volvo, Saab, Peugeot, Renault and Mercedes. In 1978 there were only eight turbocharged car models and seven used Garrett turbochargers. Garrett formed the automotive group in 1980 and by the mid-1980s there were over 100 turbocharged models. Turbochargers became commonplace by the 1990s.

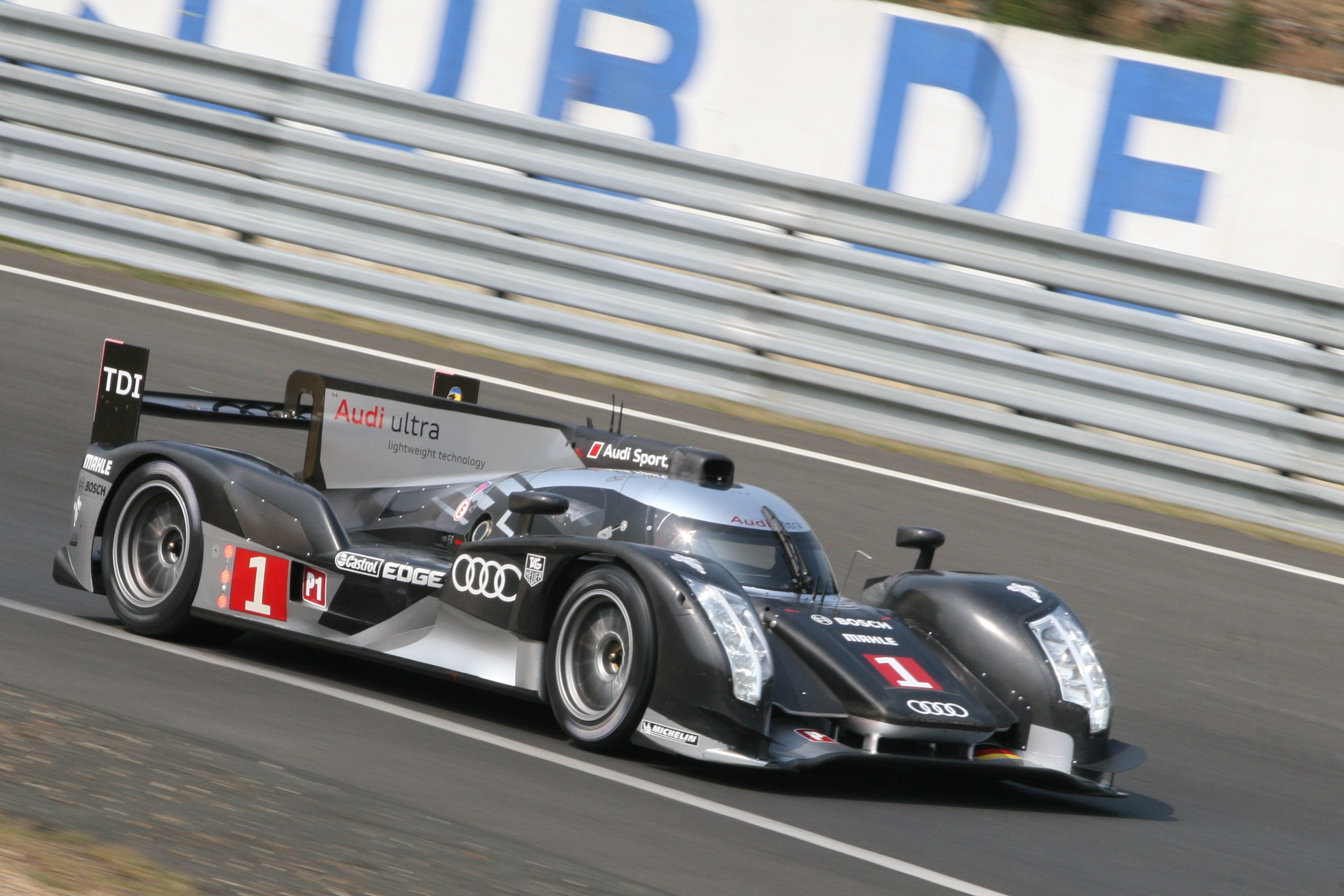
Audi R18 TDI, with Garrett turbocharger.

In 1994, Allied-Signal acquired the Lycoming Turbine Engine Division of Textron followed by the sale of the Garrett Aviation Division to General Electric three years later. In 1999, it acquired Honeywell International Inc. and adopted Honeywell as the company name. In 2011, Honeywell sold its automotive Consumer Products Group to Rank Group, a New Zealand private investment firm, for $950 million. This included brands like Fram Filters, Prestone antifreeze and Autolite spark plugs.

In the 2000s Garrett's turbochargers were installed in the engines of the Chevrolet Sonic, Mercedes S 350, Volkswagen Polo, BMW X6 ActiveHybrid, Ford F-350, Volkswagen Golf and Jaguar XF among others. In 2010 the company developed 15 new technologies for 100 new engines, including the world's first use of ball bearing technology in a mainstream light vehicle diesel engine. Garrett has developed the world's smallest turbo for the Tata Nano as well as for the 100-liter engine of the Caterpillar mining truck.

On October 1, 2018, Garrett Motion Inc. became an independent publicly traded company through a pro rata distribution of Garrett shares to Honeywell's stockholders. Each Honeywell stockholder of record received one share of Garrett common stock for every 10 shares of Honeywell common stock held on the record date. Approximately 74 million shares of Garrett common stock were distributed on October 1, 2018, to Honeywell stockholders.

On September 21, 2020, Garrett Motion announced its intention to file for Chapter 11 bankruptcy and be acquired by KPS Capital Partners.

In April 2021, Garrett emerged from Chapter 11, completing the restructuring process and implementing the restructuring plan that was confirmed by the U.S. Bankruptcy Court for the Southern District of New York on April 23, 2021. The company raised 1.3 bln in equity during Chapter 11 restructuring.

== Turbo racing ==
The Garrett brand competes in numerous motorsport series and supports sports car racing, drag racing, rally racing, and open-wheel racing. Racing vehicles using a Garrett turbo include:

| Year | Manufacturer | Race | OEM/aftermarket performance | Notes |
|---|---|---|---|---|
| 1968 | Eagle-Offy | Indianapolis 500 | OEM | First turbocharged car to win the Indy 500 |
| 1977 | Renault | Formula One World Championship | OEM | The first turbocharged engine entered in a Formula One race |
| 1978 | Renault-Alpine | 24 Hours of Le Mans | OEM | The Renault Alpine A442B won the race using a Garrett T05 turbocharger |
| 1979 | Saab | Swedish Rally | OEM | The Saab 99 Turbo was the first turbocharged car to win a World Rally Championship event, equipped with T03 turbo |
| 1987-1992 | Lancia | World Rally Manufacturers' Championship | OEM | The Lancia Delta won six World Championship in a row using Garrett T3 turbo |
| 1988 | Nissan | International Motorsport Association Championship | Aftermarket | T04S turbocharger |
| 1994 | Toyota | Pikes Peak International Hill Climb | Aftermarket | |
| 2000 | Audi | 24 Hours of Le Mans | OEM | Audi R8 used twin Garrett Motorsport turbochargers |
| 2004-2012 | Citroën | World Rally Championship | OEM | Sébastien Loeb won nine titles in a row driving for Citroën, equipped with Garrett TR30R and then GTR2560R |
| 2001 | Audi | 24 Hours of Le Mans | OEM | Audi R8 used twin Garrett Motorsport turbochargers |
| 2002 | Audi | 24 Hours of Le Mans | OEM | Audi R8 used twin Garrett Motorsport turbochargers |
| 2003 | Bentley | 24 Hours of Le Mans | OEM | Bentley Speed 8 used twin Garrett Motorsport turbochargers |
| 2004 | Audi | 24 Hours of Le Mans | OEM | Audi R8 used twin Garrett Motorsport turbochargers |
| 2005 | Audi | 24 Hours of Le Mans | OEM | Audi R8 used twin Garrett Motorsport turbochargers |
| 2006 | Audi | 24 Hours of Le Mans | OEM | Audi R10 TDI used twin Garrett Motorsport turbochargers |
| 2007 | Audi | 24 Hours of Le Mans | OEM | Audi R10 TDI used twin Garrett Motorsport turbochargers |
| 2008 | Audi | 24 Hours of Le Mans | OEM | Audi R10 TDI used twin Garrett Motorsport turbochargers |
| 2009 | Peugeot | 24 Hours of Le Mans | OEM | Peugeot 908 HDi FAP used twin Garrett Motorsport turbochargers |
| 2010 | Audi | 24 Hours of Le Mans | OEM | Audi R15 TDI LMP1 car was fitted with a custom made Honeywell variable nozzle turbocharger. This turbocharger was made specifically for the race. |
| 2011+ | Various | World Rally Championship | OEM | All factory 1.6L WRC rally cars used a Garrett Motorsport turbocharger from 2011 to 2019; Citroën, Ford / M-Sport, Hyundai, Mini / Prodrive, Toyota, Volkswagen. |
| 2011 | Audi | 24 Hours of Le Mans | OEM | Audi R18 TDI was fitted with variable geometry Garrett turbocharger |
| 2011 | Citroën | World Rally Championship | OEM | The Citroën DS3 WRC used a Garrett turbocharger |
| 2012 | Audi | 24 Hours of Le Mans | OEM | Audi R18 e-tron quattro used a single Garrett Motorsport turbocharger |
| 2013 | Audi | 24 Hours of Le Mans | OEM | Audi R18 e-tron quattro used a single Garrett Motorsport turbocharger |
| 2013 | Peugeot | Pikes Peak International Hillclimb | OEM | Record-setting Peugeot 208 T16 Pikes Peak used twin Garrett TR30R Motorsport turbochargers |
| 2014 | Audi | 24 Hours of Le Mans | OEM | Audi R18 e-tron quattro used a single Garrett Motorsport turbocharger |
| 2015 | Porsche | 24 Hours of Le Mans | OEM | Porsche 919 Hybrid used a single Garrett Motorsport turbocharger |
| 2016 – 2019 | Ford | 24 Hours of Le Mans / WEC, IMSA | OEM | Ford GT with 3.5L EcoBoost V6 used twin Garrett Motorsport turbochargers, campaigned by Chip Ganassi Racing, winning LMGTE Pro class at Le Mans in 2016, and 18 other races. |
| 2016 | Porsche | 24 Hours of Le Mans | OEM | Porsche 919 Hybrid used a single Garrett Motorsport turbocharger |
| 2017 | Porsche | 24 Hours of Le Mans | OEM | Porsche 919 Hybrid used a single Garrett Motorsport turbocharger |
| 2018 | Toyota | 24 Hours of Le Mans | OEM | Toyota TS050 Hybrid used twin Garrett Motorsport turbochargers |
| 2019 | Audi | Deutsche Tourenwagen Masters | OEM | Garrett Advancing Motion developed a standard turbocharger kit for all DTM cars since 2019 |
| 2019 | Lexus | Super GT GT500 class | OEM | Garrett Advancing Motion developed a standard turbocharger kit for all Super GT GT500 cars since 2014 |
| 2019 | Toyota | 24 Hours of Le Mans | OEM | Toyota TS050 Hybrid used twin Garrett Motorsport turbochargers |

== Technologies and products ==
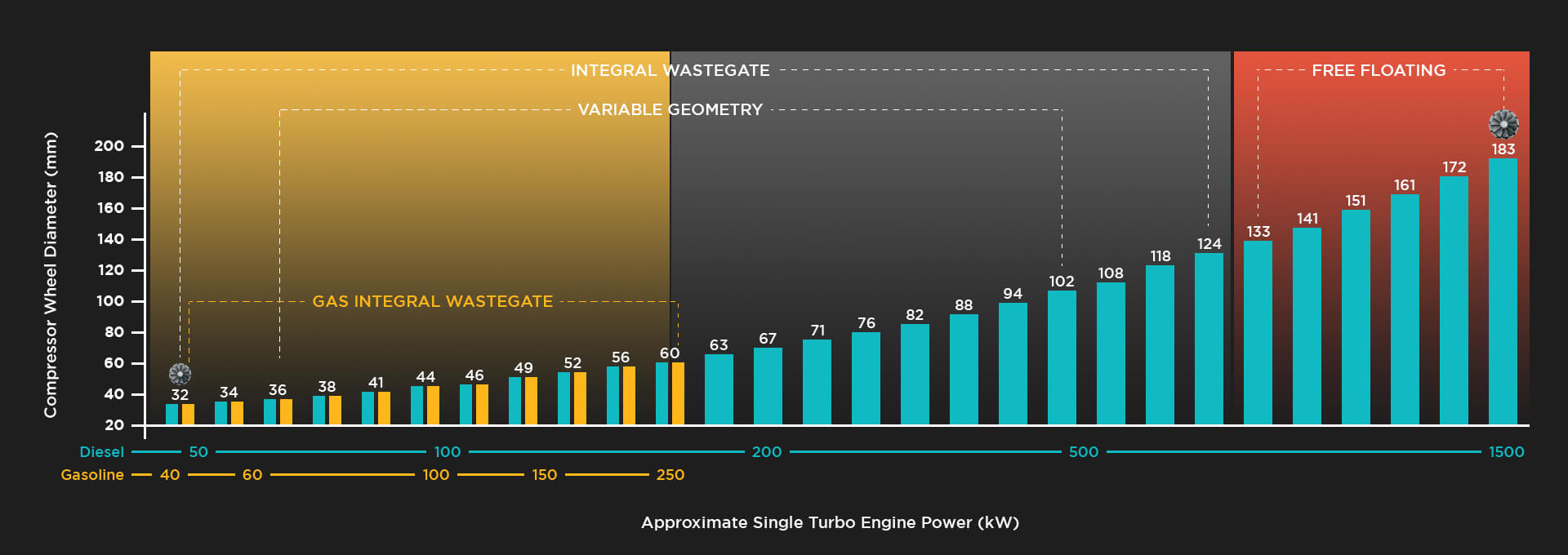
The different types and sizes of Garrett's turbochargers.

Garrett offers gasoline-powered turbochargers called wastegate turbos. They are designed to be smaller than previous turbo generations, have higher fuel efficiency, more torque, and meet emissions standards. Garrett also offers Variable-geometry turbochargers called VNT. They have nine moveable vanes, an electrohydraulic actuator and a proportional solenoid for variable control throughout the engine's power curve. This means the air passageway of the turbo varies to meet the engine's needs at different RPMs. Forty million VNT turbochargers have been sold since the 1990s. VNT DutyDrive, previously called Double Axle VNT, uses 12–19 turbine nozzle vanes supported by twin axles for trucks and buses.

Garrett also offers a diesel engine version of wastegate turbos and VNTs. Dual-stage turbochargers use two smaller turbochargers either side-by-side (parallel) or in sequence (serial). The first is used at low speeds and a valve opens up the second as engine RPMs increase. The dual-stage used in the Audi A6/A7 three liter V6 engine however runs both turbochargers at a lower pressure mode and some use one larger turbo followed by a smaller one. The Dualboost has dual compressors to mimic a twin turbocharger.

=== Patents ===
Garrett Motion has patented a single-cartridge, dual ball bearing technology, which uses a single sleeve system with a set of angular ball bearings on either end. This creates a rolling rather than sliding mechanism between parts intended to reduce the amount of pressure required to achieve airflow.
