= Trico (disambiguation) =

Trico is an American company that specializes in windshield wipers.

Trico may also refer to:

- Trico, a character from the 2016 video game The Last Guardian
- Trico Plant No. 1, the original headquarters of Trico
- Trico Mountain, a mountain summit located south of Stevens Pass in Washington, United States.
- Regional Center for Nuclear Studies, known as the Trico Center prior to 1970
- Chionodes trico, a moth in the family Gelechiidae
- TriCo Bancshares, the parent company of Tri Counties Bank
