= Walter Mathews (actor) =

American actor

- Walter Mathews in Mission Impossible 1968
- Born: October 10, 1926; New York City, New York, U.S.
- Died: April 28, 2012 (aged 85); Mountain Center, California, U.S.
- Education: Ohio University
- Occupation: Actor
- Spouse(s): Beverly Bruce (m. circa 1955)
- Children: 4

Walter Mathews (October 10, 1926 – April 28, 2012) was an American character actor whose credits included roles in television (including many commercials), film and theater, perhaps best known as the "pay me now or pay me later" Fram Oil Filter spokesperson.

== Early life and career ==
Mathews was born in New York City on October 10, 1926, and was raised in the Bronx. He earned a master's degree in drama from Ohio University.

Mathews made his Broadway debut in the 1956 production of King Lear, staged by and starring Orson Welles. The following year, he portrayed Gaius Trebonius in an off-Broadway revival of Julius Caesar, starring Sydney Walker, Robert Mandan, Ernest Graves, M'el Dowd, and Joseph Ruskin. In 1974, Mathews was a member of the original Broadway cast of Peter Shaffer's Equus.

On television, Mathews appeared in a series of commercials for Fram Oil Filters as the original fictional Fram mechanic who promised consumers, "You can pay me now or pay me later." In 1962 Matthews appeared as Mr. Harper on the TV western The Virginian in the episode titled "The Brazen Bell." Mathews also had recurring roles in the Another World and General Hospital soap operas. His additional television credits included Ripcord, Emergency!, Gomer Pyle, U.S.M.C., Murder, She Wrote, Perry Mason, Mannix, Charlie's Angels, Adam-12, Quincy, M.E., Mission: Impossible, Starsky & Hutch, Alice, Medical Center and The F.B.I..

His film credits included roles in The Naked Kiss (1964), The Lawyer (1970), Beyond Reason (1977), Nighthawks (1981), and Cannery Row (1982).

Mathews made his last on-screen appearance in 1986.

== Personal life and death ==
Having performed onstage with her at least as early as 1953, Mathews married actress-model—and aspiring singer—Beverly Bruce (née Beverly Jane Schafer) no later than 1955. They had four children, two sons and two daughters.

On April 28, 2012, at the age of 85, Mathews died of natural causes in Mountain Center, California, survived by his four children and five grandchildren.

== Filmography ==
Year	Title	Role	Notes
1959	Middle of the Night	Mickey Hilliard	Uncredited
1964	The Naked Kiss	Mike	
1964	Where Love Has Gone	Reporter	Uncredited
1966	Boy, Did I Get a Wrong Number!	Stagehand, Movie Set	Uncredited
1966	Not with My Wife, You Don't!	Television Producer	Uncredited
1967	A Covenant with Death	Appraiser	Uncredited
1970	The Lawyer	Mr. Andre	
1981	Nighthawks	Commissioner	
1982	Cannery Row	Sonny	
1984	Racing with the Moon	Sailor	Voice
1985	Beyond Reason	Al	
1986	The Check Is in the Mail...	Water & Power man #1	
1986	Mission Kill	Foreman	
