= Fund for Protection of Investors' Rights in Foreign States =

- Formation: March 28, 2016; 10 years ago
- Founder: Yaroslav Bogdanov, Margarita Chernogolova
- Website: lic-fund.org

Fund for Protection of Investors' Rights in Foreign States, LIC-FUND is non-commercial organization that defends rights, economic and other interests of investors: Russian citizens, foreigners, stateless persons, refugees, as well as legal entities that fall under protection of Russian and foreign jurisdictions and are in need of effective protection of the rights guaranteed by national and international laws.

== History ==
Created on March 28, 2016 after the adoption of the Federal Law No. 297-FZ dated 03.11.2015 "On the jurisdictional immunities of a foreign state and property of a foreign state in the Russian Federation", which changed the jurisdictional immunity of foreign states in Russia. The Fund specializes in resolving disputes in Russian and international courts.

Since February 2018, the Fund has been a member of the interdepartmental working group of the Ministry of Foreign Affairs created to develop recommendations for ensuring effective legal protection of Russian citizens abroad.

== Important cases ==
=== Bank Snoras: lawsuit against the Republic of Lithuania ===
On November 16, 2011, the government of Lithuania adopted the Resolution No. 1329 “On withdrawal of Bank Snoras shares for public needs” with the payment of compensation to shareholders. The compensation hasn't been paid to this day.

On November 24, 2011, Bank of Lithuania revoked the license of Bank Snoras following the report of the interim manager Simon Freakley. In August, 2016 the former majority shareholder of Bank Snoras, with the support of the Fund, filed a lawsuit in Moscow Arbitration Court against the Republic of Lithuania to recover property damage (material damage) in the amount of 20,209,353,110 rubles, to compensate for the damage to the business reputation in the amount of 19,904,862,500 rubles and to declare false the information that had been disseminated by the President of the Republic of Lithuania and further reposted by the online media.

Lithuania has used the right of state immunity from the jurisdiction of Russian courts.

In 2019 the Fund filed a lawsuit for the illegal nationalization of Bank Snoras in the United Nations Commission on International Trade Law (UNCITRAL). The preliminary amount of the claim is 1.1 billion euros.

Also the Fund's human rights defenders applied to the New York court to oblige Simon Freakley (the interim bank manager for the period of nationalization) and his new company AlixPartners to provide documents confirming the shortage in the capital of Bank Snoras and justifying the nationalization and expropriation.

Lithuania tried to challenge this appeal, but it was declined in court. The media called this decision the Fund's first victory in the case.

=== Lawsuit against National bank TRUST ===
On April 15, 2020, the Fund for the Protection of Investors’ Rights in Foreign Countries filed a lawsuit with the High Court of Justice (London, UK) against Trust Bank and its former owners and top managers Ilya Yurov, Sergey Belyaev and Nikolay Fetisov, as well as their wives. The preliminary amount of the claim is 300 million pounds.

The Fund represents the interests of a group of investors (former clients of Trust Bank) who invested in credit-linked notes distributed by the bank to its major depositors. Due to illegal and unfair actions of the former owners of Trust Bank, deceived investors lost all their funds put in credit-linked notes, since the credit-linked notes were canceled as a result of the actions of Ilya Yurov, Nikolai Fetisov and Sergei Belyaev.

The application to the High Court of Justice and the right of this court to consider the claim is based on the fact that Mr. Yurov and Mr. Fetisov, as well as their spouses, currently live in England.

According to British lawyers, the case can be considered within a year, since the High Court of Justice has recently ruled against Yurov, Belyaev and Fetisov on the lawsuit of National Bank TRUST, which resolved a large number of issues also related to the case of the Fund. The court decided that all three bankers were involved in the fraudulent scheme and bear responsibility for the bank collapse in December, 2014.
