= Patrick James (businessman) =

Indian-American businessman

- Born: 1964 (age 61–62); Kuala Lumpur, Malaysia
- Education: College of Wooster
- Occupation: Businessman
- Known for: Founder of First Brands
- Spouse: Elizabeth James
- Children: 2

Patrick James (born 1964) is an Indian-American businessman who founded First Brands and was its chief executive officer (CEO) until October 2025.

== Early life and education ==
Patrick James was born in 1964 in Kuala Lumpur, Malaysia to an Indian Catholic family. He spent his early years in Petaling Jaya, a satellite township of Kuala Lumpur, Malaysia, where he attended a school administered by the De La Salle Brothers. Later, he supplied equipment for discos.

In the 1980s, James moved to the U.S. to study at the College of Wooster, a small liberal-arts college in northern Ohio. During his time as a student, James managed the on-campus bar, Ichabod's, and was a member of a student investment society that traded real stocks. In a 1984 student publication, he characterized himself as an outgoing individual with interests in music and social events.

== Career ==
=== Early industrial career ===
Following graduation, James remained in Ohio and initially worked at a mergers and acquisitions firm. In the 1990s and 2000s, he began acquiring local auto industry manufacturers using a complex network of holding companies and subsidiaries such as Viking Industries and Hawthorn Manufacturing. During this period, he faced legal and financial scrutiny. Court filings indicated that James's companies frequently transacted with one another, and he drew substantial management fees from several entities.

=== Litigation and business controversies ===
From the 2000s onward, James and his companies were involved in multiple lawsuits linked to plant closures, bankruptcies and disputes with lenders. An Ohio industrial executive who had known him since the 1990s alleged that a number of businesses collapsed after James took control, and characterised this as a recurring pattern.

In 2005, Worthington Steel, a major Ohio steelmaker, claimed that James personally guaranteed about $1.2 million in exchange for forbearance on an alleged loan default. After a further alleged default, Worthington accused him of fraud, including instructing employees to destroy books and records to conceal "gross mismanagement". James denied the allegations, contended that he had been "fraudulently induced" into signing the guarantee and filed a counterclaim. His spokesperson later described the suggestion that he ordered the destruction of evidence as "particularly egregious" and "patently absurd". The case was dismissed following a settlement between the parties.

In 2009, another lender alleged that companies controlled by James had made misrepresentations and omissions about assets pledged as collateral and that he continued to pay himself management fees after a business had ceased operations. A 2011 lawsuit accused him of using a "web of companies" to move funds in an attempt to defraud creditors. According to his spokesperson, these and similar "complex disputes" arose in the aftermath of the global financial crisis, a period in which large industrial groups such as General Motors and Chrysler also entered bankruptcy protection, and "any allegations of improper dealings" by James were said to be "categorically false". Several cases were resolved through settlements.

=== First Brands ===
As the U.S. economy recovered, James shifted his focus to consolidating the fragmented auto parts sector, relying heavily on borrowed funds. According to one Ohio-based executive, his prior defaults complicated access to traditional bank financing, particularly from local institutions. James's representatives, however, have said that he was subjected to extensive due diligence “hundreds of times” by banks and customers without issue.

His expansion coincided with the growth of private credit and other non-bank lending. Jefferies Group, a Wall Street investment bank known for arranging and distributing higher-risk corporate loans, played a central role in financing his acquisitions. In 2014, Jefferies helped provide a loan for James's purchase of Trico, a Michigan-based windscreen wiper manufacturer that became a cornerstone of what later evolved into First Brands Group. Jefferies' long-serving chief executive, Rich Handler, later stressed that First Brands worked with a range of financial institutions, though Jefferies arranged numerous transactions for the group over the following decade.

Beyond conventional term loans, James made extensive use of supply-chain finance, under which banks or finance providers pay a company's suppliers and are repaid later by the company, often in structures not classified as debt on corporate balance sheets. First Brands also drew on other forms of asset-based borrowing tied to inventories, receivables and other collateral, alongside traditional bank facilities.

In October 2025, James and his brother, Edward, stepped down from their senior roles at First Brands.

On January 29, 2026, James and his brother were indicted on federal fraud charges. Both are accused of intentionally bankrupting First Brands and fraudulently obtaining billions of dollars without notice from lenders and financing partners by inflating invoices for accounts receivable and payable, falsifying financial payments and hiding substantial liabilities from lenders. James has pleaded not guilty to all charges in the nine-count indictment.

== Philanthropy ==
Through the Sandor Foundation, James and his wife donated millions of dollars to a non-profit and parish associated with Father Robert Stec, a priest who has been pastor of St Ambrose Church in Ohio since 2005. Public filings show that Stec received almost $1 million in compensation over seven years for work as a philanthropic consultant. Additionally, in 2024, the Sandor Foundation funneled $1,567,500 to the Mejor Via Foundation, of which Stec is a Trustee, while Stec received a consulting fee of $271,213 from the Sandor Foundation in that same year. Two people who worked closely with James have said that Stec was a frequent visitor to the couple’s estate in Chagrin Falls, Ohio, where James built a private chapel. The property includes multiple houses and two tennis courts.

== Personal life ==
James is married to Elizabeth James. In the 2010s, he purchased two farms in Ohio with horse stables, followed by oceanfront properties in Malibu and the Hamptons. In 2021, he bought a Hamptons house for $18.75 million.

To manage and secure these properties and a collection of vintage cars, James employed a large household staff, including a security team drawn in part from former military personnel.
