= BondMason =

BondMason Group Limited
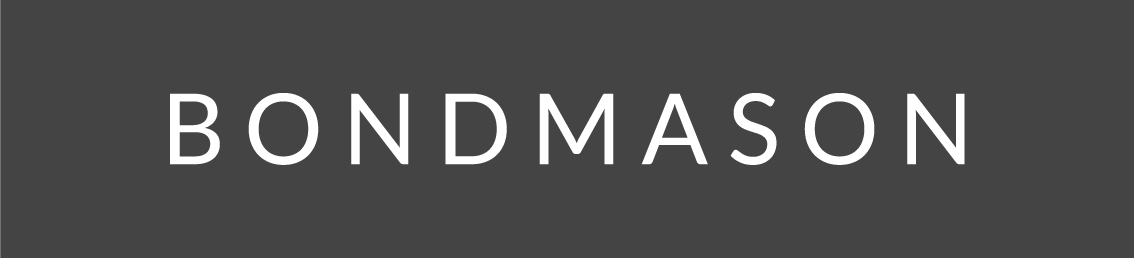
- Type: Private
- Industry: Financial services
- Founded: 2013
- Founder: Stephen Findlay
- Headquarters: Harpenden, United Kingdom
- Products: Financial services Direct lending
- Number of employees: 18
- Website: www.bondmason.com

BondMason is a direct lending (including peer-to-peer lending) investment manager based in Harpenden, England.

== History ==
BondMason was founded in 2013 by Stephen Findlay, an accountant with a background in private equity who previously worked at Fidelity Equity Partners.

BondMason's peer-to-peer lending platform operated from October 2015 until May 2019, at which point it ceased its core property-lending investment service. The company claims that this was not due to financial troubles, but rather concerns about the credit outlook. Findlay had also explained in an interview that the platform had struggled to obtain FCA regulation. According to the company web page, BondMason's clients received over 100% of their invested capital back.

In 2016, BondMason completed an equity funding round led by Par Equity, a venture capital firm based in Edinburgh, Scotland. In March 2018, the company secured £1.85 million in another funding round led by Seneca Partners and Par Equity.

BondMason was one of the first companies accepted onto the Financial Conduct Authority (FCA) Innovation Hub programme.

== Business Model and Activities ==
BondMason's peer-to-peer lending platform enabled clients to access returns from direct lending, mostly loans secured against UK property. It offered bonds and investment funds.

The company also produced proprietary research into direct lending market trends, including analysis that identified the size and growth of the UK peer-to-peer lending market from £2.3bn in 2015 to £3.2bn in 2016.

== External sources ==
- BondMason - Homepage
