= Raybestos =

Manufacturer of automotive brakes

- Type: Private
- Industry: Auto parts
- Founded: 1902
- Headquarters: McHenry, Illinois, United States
- Products: Brakes
- Parent: Friction One (2026-present)
- Website: raybestos.com

Raybestos is a brand of automotive brakes established in 1902 by Arthur H. Raymond and Arthur F. Law of Bridgeport, Connecticut.

== History ==
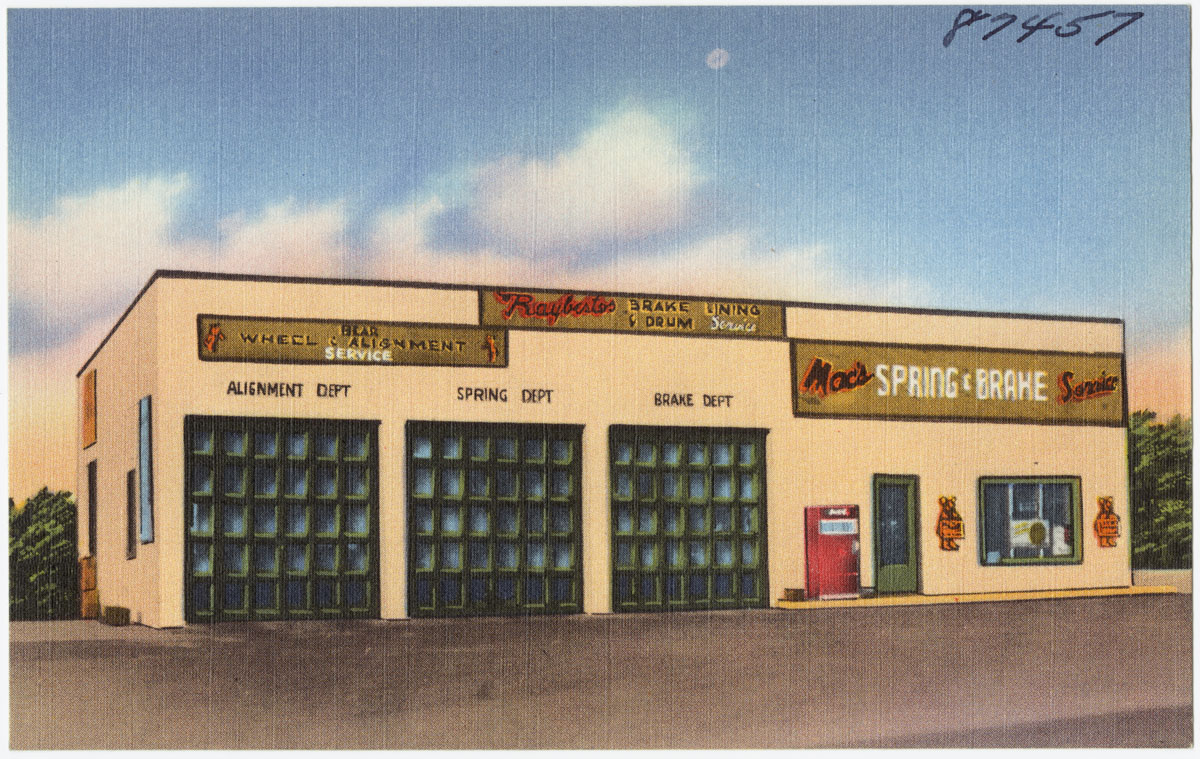
Mac's Spring & Brake Service shop, with Raybestos brakes (ca. 1930-1945).

In 1906, Raymond and Law invented the woven brake lining, an important innovation in automotive brakes. From 1919 to 1989 Raybestos brand was manufactured by Raymark Industries, Inc, of Stratford, Connecticut.

Raymark Industries filed for Chapter 11 bankruptcy in 1998.

The brand is currently distributed by Brake Parts Inc based in McHenry, Illinois. In August 2020, First Brands Group (Trico) acquired Brake Parts Inc. In September 2025, Raybestos' current parent company, First Brands Group, filed for Chapter 11 bankruptcy after substantial losses in revenue, listing assets between $5 billion and $10 billion and liabilities between $10 billion and $50 billion.

On January 26, 2026, First Brands announced that it would be winding down its Autolite, Brake Parts, Inc., and Cardone subsidiaries after being unable to secure funding and complete a sale for the three companies. In June 2026, Friction One acquired the brand.

== Superfund site cleanup ==
The Stratford, Connecticut factory site is a designated Superfund site. The Federal Environmental Protection Agency reported:

The Raymark facility operated at (the Stratford) location from 1919 until 1989, manufacturing asbestos brake linings and other automotive asbestos products. The facility operated as a hazardous waste generator and land disposal facility. Raymark Industries, Inc. is a RCRA subtitle C regulated facility which is currently subject to bankruptcy proceedings. Hazardous waste produced on site includes lead-asbestos dust, metals and solvents. From 1919 to July 1984, Raymark used a system of lagoons to capture waste lead and asbestos dust produced by its manufacturing process. Dredged materials from the lagoons were landfilled at numerous other locations in the town of Stratford, Connecticut.

== Raybestos Manhatten ==
Raybestos Manhatten, Inc. was incorporated in New Jersey on July 5, 1929 with an authorized capital of 1,000,000 no par shares and 667,915 issued in exchange for:

- 267,012 for all assets of The Raybestos Company (2.25-for-1), incorporated in Connecticut on Oct 14, 1916
- 114,000 for all assets of the United States Asbestos Company (1.14-for-1), incorporated in Pennsylvania Aug 24, 1906
- 250,000 for all assets of the Manhattan Rubber Manufacturing Company (1.25-for-1), incorporated in New Jersey Oct 28, 1893
- 45,000 shares sold to the public for $1,350,000 of working capital ($30 per share)

The company was listed on the New York Stock Exchange in September 1929, only a few weeks before the Wall Street Crash of 1929.

The Raybestos Company was a pioneer in the manufacture of woven asbestos brake linings in the United States. They had spent more than $2 million since 1916 on advertising their brand and at the time of the merger were the largest consumer of long fiber asbestos in the world. They had licensed 3,500 service stations in the States and in Canada, their products were used in some 40,000 repair shops and Raybestos-Belaco Ltd had been established in London for distribution in Europe. Their main plant was in Bridgeport (41.16729°N 73.21259°W) and auxiliary plants were in Stratford (41.20089°N 73.11971°W) and Peterborough (44.29491°N 78.32446°W) and North Charleston (32.8842°N 79.9757°W) (wholly owned subsidiary General Asbestos & Rubber Co of South Carolina was dissolved in the 1929 merger; the North Charleston plant was the largest asbestos spinning plant in the world).

Manhattan Rubber produced conveyor and transmission belts (trademarked Condor), suction and fire hose, press rolls and packing material in their plants in Passaic (40.85559°N 74.14147°W) and Whippany.

US Asbestos produced brake linings (trademark Grey Rock), clutch facings, asbestos cloth, packing and gaskets in their Manheim plant (40.16094°N 76.38823°W).

Revenue
| | Raybestos | Manhattan | US Asbestos |
|---|---|---|---|
| 1924 | $4,287,387 | ? | $1,452,709 |
| 1925 | 5,065,808 | ? | 1,953,397 |
| 1926 | 5,059,368 | ? | 2,379,931 |
| 1927 | 5,732,880 | 11,798,697 | 2,899,037 |
| 1928 | 6,870,660 | 11,098,636 | 3,528,507 |

== See also ==
- Connecticut Brakettes — women's fastpitch softball team founded in 1947 at Raybestos.
