= First Brands Group =

Defunct American auto parts company

- Type: Private
- Industry: Automotive aftermarket
- Predecessor: Crowne Group
- Founded: 2013; 13 years ago
- Founder: Patrick James
- Defunct: September 1, 2026
- Fate: Chapter 7 bankruptcy liquidation
- Headquarters: Cleveland, Ohio, United States
- Area served: Worldwide
- Key people: Charles Moore (CEO)
- Products: Wiper blades Spark plugs Brake components Oil filters
- Brands: Trico; FRAM; Raybestos; Autolite
- Owner: Patrick James
- Website: Official website at the Wayback Machine (archived 2026-04-22)

First Brands Group was an American auto parts company based in Cleveland, Ohio. It owned brands such as Trico, FRAM, Raybestos, and Autolite. First Brands Group generated revenues of more than $5 billion in 2024 from manufacturing and distributing automotive products, primarily into aftermarket retail channels. It is being liquidated in Chapter 7 bankruptcy as of September 1, 2026.

== History ==
=== 2013–2025: Early years, acquisitions, and growth ===
First Brands Group was founded in 2013 in Ohio by Patrick James as Crowne Group.

In 2020, the company was rebranded as First Brands Group. James bought Trico, a manufacturer of windshield wipers and, using debt, acquired 24 automotive-related companies. In August 2020, they acquired brakes manufacturer Raybestos. It owned filters maker FRAM and the Autolite brand of spark plugs and ignition wire sets.

In 2021, Michael Baker, a Canadian lawyer who had spent the previous decade as a partner at the law firm Paul Hastings and was regarded as one of the United States' most prominent corporate debt attorneys, joined First Brands as chief corporate strategy officer.

At the time of bankruptcy, James controlled an international auto-parts conglomerate with an enterprise value in the billions of dollars. He rebranded his holdings as First Brands Group and recruited senior executives with extensive connections to leading Wall Street lenders.

=== 2025–present: Bankruptcy, federal indictment ===
In September 2025, First Brands filed for Chapter 11 bankruptcy protection in Texas. They had experienced substantial losses in revenue due to creditor concern over liabilities of $10–50 billion against assets of $1–10 billion, funded by "opaque off-balance sheet financing".

On October 8, 2025, UBS announced that they would be investigating First Brands' bankruptcy case. UBS claimed that they had exposure of more than $500 million from First Brands' bankruptcy through agreements towards supply chain financing. That same day, Katsumi Global claimed that First Brands owed them $1.7 billion. Jefferies Group also ended up being exposed to First Brands' bankruptcy case, claiming that Leucadia Asset Management, a fund managed by the company, held $715 million in receivables linked to First Brands. Jefferies also accused First Brands of failing to make payments from obligators of Point Bonita Capital, managed by Leucadia. Analysts at Morgan Stanley predicted that Jefferies is expected to lose over $40 million as a result of the bankruptcy case.

On October 9, it was reported that First Brands would be facing a federal criminal investigation by the United States Department of Justice after discovering over $2.3 billion went missing. They accused the company of "double-pledging its trade receivables to third-party investors." Raistone, a creditor of First Brands, claimed that the $2.3 billion "vanished" from the company. Later that day, a joint venture between Norinchukin Bank and Mitsui & Co. claimed that $1.75 billion was exposed to First Brands, stating that they extended trade financing to the company.

On October 10, Patrick James announced that he would be discussing the possibility of stepping down as CEO of the company. On October 12, 2025, Jefferies claimed that they would see limited impact from the bankruptcy of First Brands and that any potential losses would easily be manageable following a significant share loss in its stock. On October 13, 2025, James resigned as CEO and announced that Charles Moore, CFO of the company, would replace him as CEO. James also announced that his brother, Edward James, would be resigning from his senior position with the company.

On October 13, Morningstar DBRS published a research note discussing the credit implications of First Brands' bankruptcy for trade credit insurers and reinsurers. According to the credit rating agency, "the collapse of First Brands is likely to become a real-world stress test for the trade credit ecosystem at the intersection of insured receivables and private credit." Morningstar DBRS' initial base case for total insured losses linked to First Brands' receivables program is in the range of $300–600 million, which Morningstar DBRS believes should remain manageable for the sector (i.e., an earnings event with no capital strain). In its adverse scenario, Morningstar DBRS "anticipate[s] broader claims recognition, reserve strengthening, and total losses potentially exceeding $1 billion across trade credit insurers and reinsurers." For the broader TCI market, Morningstar DBRS "expect[s] a general repricing of receivables associated with highly leveraged insureds and complex supply chain finance structures." More recently, Morningstar DBRS stated that "insurers' decisions to maintain near-record exposure levels therefore signals confidence in risk selection and reinsurance protection. Still, it also heightens the potential for loss volatility should a global trade contraction or major bankruptcy trigger correlated claims."

On January 26, 2026, First Brands announced that it would be winding down its Autolite, Brake Parts, Inc., and Cardone subsidiaries after being unable to secure funding and complete a sale for the three companies.

On January 29, former CEO Patrick James and his brother Edward James, were indicted on federal fraud charges including bank fraud, conspiracy to commit bank fraud, conspiracy to commit wire fraud, conspiracy to commit money laundering, and wire fraud. Patrick James was also indicted on managing a continuing financial crimes enterprise that is connected to the previous charges. Both are accused of intentionally bankrupting the company and fraudulently obtaining billions of dollars without notice from lenders and financing partners by inflating invoices for accounts receivable and payable, falsifying financial payments and hiding substantial liabilities from lenders. A third defendant, Peter Andrew Brumbergs, plead guilty to similar charges and is now a cooperating witness in these cases. Kareem Carter, the executive special agent in charge of the IRS Criminal Investigation field office in Washington, DC, said that the defendants were using money from new loans to pay old loans and to fund their lifestyles, making First Brands into a Ponzi scheme.

On September 1, 2026, the Chapter 11 bankruptcy case was converted to a Chapter 7 bankruptcy liquidation case.

== Role of non-bank lenders ==
One early provider of financing was Greensill Capital, which from 2015 extended tens of millions of dollars of funding linked to invoices issued by Crowne Group, a holding company controlled by James. Greensill later collapsed in 2021 amid its own scandal, prompting scrutiny of supply-chain finance generally. Even after that failure, James raised additional billions of dollars, largely from private credit firms that marketed such "asset-backed" lending as comparatively low risk.

Supply chain and invoice lenders often dealt primarily with James’s older brother, Ed James, who served as First Brands’ key contact for "working capital solutions". The group’s funding structures connected it to several major financial institutions. UBS’s Chicago-based hedge fund unit O’Connor acquired a stake in Raistone, a technology platform that facilitated supply-chain finance for First Brands, and also purchased First Brands-linked invoices directly, as did a joint venture between Mitsui & Co. of Japan and Norinchukin Bank.

Jefferies was also involved through Point Bonita Capital, a private credit fund focused on invoice finance that told investors it conducted detailed research and credit analysis. Onset Financial, a Utah-based lender, later said it had amassed about $1.9 billion of exposure to First Brands’ inventory-backed debt by the time of the company’s bankruptcy. In a public case study apparently referring to First Brands, Onset acknowledged that it had provided funding even though a recent reorganisation made it difficult to obtain a clear financial picture.

Regulatory filings indicated that lenders often earned double-digit yields on First Brands’ off-balance-sheet invoice and inventory facilities. Some investors in funds that participated in these structures later said they were unaware of the extent of their exposure to James’s companies. Firms such as UBS O’Connor and Point Bonita argued that the credit risk was tied primarily to large corporate customers named on invoices, including Walmart. After the bankruptcy, however, Raistone and Point Bonita disclosed that payments had been routed to them through First Brands rather than directly from the customers.

Several asset-backed finance specialists have stated that they declined to transact with First Brands, or reduced existing credit lines, when the company failed to provide requested documentation or explanations. Some potential lenders reported that they received unsatisfactory answers when querying its financial statements and observed that its reported margins significantly exceeded those of comparable peers. One lender recalled that when he explained to Ed James that his team would need to inspect warehouse inventory against stock records for a proposed deal, he was told: "We don’t let lenders into the warehouse."

== Similar cases ==
First Brands Group's bankruptcy has been compared to the 2025 and 2026 bankruptcies of Tricolor and Market Financial Solutions respectively. Both companies are also facing allegations of fraud.

== See also ==
- 2025–2026 private credit crisis
- Tricolor
- Market Financial Solutions
