= John R. Oishei =

American industrialist (1886-1968)

- Born: January 18, 1886; Buffalo, New York
- Died: January 27, 1968 (aged 82); Buffalo, New York
- Resting place: Forest Lawn Cemetery, Buffalo, New York
- Education: Central High School
- Known for: Trico & The John R. Oishei Foundation
- Spouse: Estelle Reed Low
- Children: R. John Oishei; Julian Oishei; Patricia Oishei
- Parent(s): Charles Humbert Oishei; Julia Roffo

John R. Oishei (January 18, 1886 – January 27, 1968) was a businessman who founded Trico products and became one of Buffalo’s wealthiest citizens and philanthropists.

== Early life ==
John R. Oishei was born in Buffalo in 1886 to Charles Humbert Oishei and Julia (Roffo) Oishei. Oishei's grandfather, Giuseppe "Joseph" Oishei, immigrated to the United States from Lombardy, Italy in 1859. By 1868, Joseph owned a saloon on Buffalo's Prime Street and by 1861, owned another saloon and restaurant on Ohio Street in Buffalo. Joseph married Adelheide Von Wildt and had three children: Charles (John's father), Aurelia and Amelia. At the time of Joseph's death in 1878, he owned the Golden Gate Hotel at 160 Exchange Street in Buffalo. Charles, aged 19, took over responsibility for the family for his deceased father and by 1890, graduated from Buffalo Law School and set up a law practice.

== Career ==
In 1916, Oishei was traveling down Delaware Avenue near Virginia Street in downtown Buffalo during a rainstorm. A bicyclist ran into the National Roadster he was driving at the time. Oishei never saw him coming, and even though the cyclist was not seriously injured, Oishei vowed to never let that happen again. He sought out the best technology available at the time to create the first automobile wiper blades and grew the idea from a simple fix to worldwide use. In 1917, John R. Oishei founded Trico Products Corporation He looked around for a way to clear moisture from a driver's line of vision, and decided to invest in the national marketing of an edged, hand-pulled rubber squeegee that was produced in Buffalo by an engineer named John Jepson. Within three years, Oishei's sales team had successfully sold the accessory to Packard, Lincoln, Cadillac and Buffalo's own Pierce-Arrow.

=== Buyout of Jepson ===
Through those sales, Oishei raised enough capital to buy out Jepson in 1919 and when World War I ended, he expanded availability of the product to Europe and beyond. Although maintaining cash flow to service early loans made Trico's initial survival a dicey proposition, its success was assured following the immediate post-World War I automotive boom. Early on, most Trico sales were the easily refitted squeegee that fit in the slot of two-piece windshields. For one-piece glass, Trico offered a spring-loaded arcing wiper that was operated by hand and pivoted across the field of vision. Although Trico did not invent the wiper motor, it did come up with a reliable unit run by an engine's manifold vacuum that quickly became the industry standard, especially in the aftermarket. Cadillac was the first to make these powered wipers standard. In 1934, that refillable wiper was redesigned to fit the new curved windshields, complete with internal springs to ensure constant pressure across the glass. Two years later, Trico introduced a powered windshield washer. In 1937, its wipers were standard across the entire U.S. auto industry.

Trico eventually became one of the world's leading manufacturers of automotive windshield wiping equipment.

== Personal life ==
Oishei married Estelle Low on April 21, 1908. Together, they had:

- R. John Oishei (born 1910)
- Julian Oishei (born 1910)
- Patricia Oishei (born 1916)

Estelle died of a heart attack on August 11, 1938.

He was a member of the Country Club of Buffalo, the Saturn Club, president of the Buffalo Club (elected in 1948) where he participated in an elite group within the Club designated the "Society of the Buffalo." At his death in Buffalo in 1968, Oishei had $44 million (equivalent to $407,368,000 in 2025) in stocks and bonds and approximately $1 million (equivalent to $9,258,000 in 2025) in insurance policies.

== The John R. Oishei Foundation ==
In 1940, Oishei established the Foundation, formerly known as the "Julia R. and Estelle L. Foundation." He funded it with annual contributions and with charitable remainder trusts. Oishei served as President of the Foundation from its founding until his death in 1968. The Foundation concentrated its support to hospitals and schools in the Buffalo area with the balance being directed to cultural and social services needs. Until 1997, all Foundation contributions were made on an anonymous basis. This was consistent with the procedures Oishei followed with regard to the substantial charitable gifts he personally made during his lifetime. His penchant for total anonymity was driven by his strong sense of modesty and of equally strong belief that anonymity allowed him to make his philanthropic decisions with greater objectivity.

As of December 2015, the Foundation has $300 million in assets and gives away nearly $20 million annually. It is among the region’s most well-known grantmakers, providing resources for programs, capital projects and nonprofit executive development and in the last few years alone, it provided multimillion-dollar gifts to the largest health and education projects in Western New York. This includes a $10 million donation to develop the now-renamed John R. Oishei Children's Hospital.

== See also ==
- Trico
- Trico Plant No. 1
