= Market Financial Solutions =

Defunct British specialist mortgage lender

- Type: Private
- Industry: Lender
- Founded: 2006; 20 years ago
- Founder: Paresh Raja
- Defunct: February 2026; 9 months ago
- Fate: administration
- Headquarters: 46 Hertford Street; Mayfair, London, United States
- Area served: England, United Kingdom
- Key people: Paresh Raja (founder, former CEO)
- Services: Financial services, mortgage loans
- Website: www.mfsuk.com at the Wayback Machine (archived January 25, 2026)

Market Financial Solutions Ltd (MFS) was a British specialist financial services firm and mortgage lender that provided bridge loans and buy to let mortgages. Founded in 2006, the company entered administration in February 2026 following allegations of massive financial irregularities, including collateral double-pledging and a reported shortfall of approximately £930 million ($1.3 billion).

The collapse of MFS triggered a broader market sell-off in the financial services sector and was described by analysts as a "cockroach event," a term referring to hidden systemic risks in the private credit and asset-backed lending markets.

== History ==
MFS was established in 2006 by Paresh Raja, who served as the company's chief executive officer. The firm specialized in providing rapid, complex property-backed loans for borrowers who could not meet the strict criteria of mainstream high-street banks. By 2024, the company reported record turnover of £71 million and an institutional loan book estimated at over £2.3 billion.

The company raised capital through a combination of private investors (predominately within the British Indian community) and major institutional warehouse facilities from global investment banks, including Barclays, Jefferies Financial Group, and Apollo Global Management's Atlas SP Partners.

== Insolvency and fraud allegations ==
On February 20, 2026, MFS applied to the High Court of Justice for administration, citing a "technical and procedural impasse" with its banking providers. The application however, was subsequently taken over by its creditors, Amber Bridging Ltd and Zircon Bridging Ltd, who alleged "real and serious concerns about mismanagement."

During the court proceedings, it was alleged that MFS had engaged in double-pledging, a practice where the same asset is used as collateral to secure multiple loans from different lenders. Administrators from AlixPartners estimated that while MFS owed roughly £1.2 billion to institutional creditors, the underlying collateral was only worth approximately £230 million.

In March 2026, court documents and media reports indicated that the founder, Paresh Raja, had reportedly left the United Kingdom for Dubai following the allegations of fraud. Through a spokesperson, Raja has categorically denied any allegations of fraud. AlixPartners obtained orders from courts in London and Dubai for a worldwide asset freezing order on Paresh Raja, as well as a travel ban on him. The Financial Conduct Authority has started an enforcement investigation.

In September 2026, The Daily Telegraph stated that the administrator's report now listed debt at about £2.3 billion, with only £700,000 had been recovered to date. A lawsuit brought by some of the creditors alleged Raja and his wife received more than £408 million into personal bank accounts in the UK, Monaco, Singapore and the United Arab Emirates; Raja strongly denied the allegations and maintained that no fraud or dishonesty took place.

=== Market impact ===
The implosion of MFS caused significant volatility in the shares of its primary lenders. Barclays reportedly faced a potential exposure of up to £600 million ($810 million), while Jefferies disclosed a £103 million exposure to a warehouse facility linked to the firm.

The Guardian reported the lenders at most risk of losses were banks such as Barclays, Jefferies Financial Group and Santander, private credit lenders including Elliott Investment Management and Castlelake, and some hedge funds.

== Similar cases ==
The event has been compared to the 2025 bankruptcies of the American firms Tricolor and First Brands Group, leading to fears of a wider contagion in the consumer and property lending sectors.

== See also ==
- 2025–2026 private credit crisis
- Tricolor
- First Brands Group
