= Autolite =

American brand of spark plugs

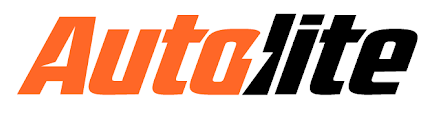
- Type: Division
- Predecessor: Division of UCI–FRAM AutoBrands
- Founded: 1911
- Headquarters: Cleveland, Ohio, U.S.
- Parent: Premium Guard, Inc.
- Website: https://autolite.com/

Autolite or Auto–Lite is an American brand of spark plugs and ignition wire sets headquartered in Cleveland, Ohio. Autolite products are sold in the United States, Canada, Mexico, and Australia. Until 2011, the Autolite brand was a part of Honeywell's automotive Consumer Products Group, along with FRAM and Prestone. Since then, it has been manufactured and marketed by FRAM Group. Autolite has been the official spark plug of NASCAR since April 2000.

== History ==
The origins of Autolite are traced to 1911, when Electric Autolite was founded. The company produced generators to power early day buggy lamps. In 1927, Electric Autolite acquired the Prest–O–Lite Battery Company, which produced automotive batteries, from The Union Carbide Corporation. In 1934, an Autolite facility in Toledo, Ohio was the site of the Auto-Lite strike. In 1935, Royce G. Martin, President of the Electric Autolite Company, decided the company should enter the business of manufacturing spark plugs. Robert Twells, a ceramic engineer, led the development team. In 1936, the first spark plug was produced at their Fostoria, Ohio plant. A few months later, the company sold their first spark plug. Electric Autolite's products were expanded further to include starter motors, ignition systems, and wire and cable products. Autolite had secured supply contracts with leading car manufacturers such as Chrysler, Studebaker, and Packard.

In a 1940 promotional film, Autolite featured stop motion animation of its products marching past Autolite factories to the tune of Franz Schubert's Military March. An abbreviated version of this sequence was later used in television ads for Autolite. Announcer Harlow Wilcox turned the ad's tagline "You're always right with Autolite!" into a national catchphrase.

Autolite logo, c. 1970

In 1961, the Ford Motor Company acquired the Autolite trade name, an Ohio spark plug factory, a Michigan battery facility, limited distribution rights, and the services of several employees. Autolite products became standard original factory equipment in Ford vehicles. A federal antitrust lawsuit was filed against Ford, which dragged on through the remainder of the 1960s, ultimately being decided in 1972 by the Supreme Court against Ford, which was forced to sell its Autolite-related assets to the Bendix Corporation by 1973. At that point, Ford replaced the Autolite brand with the Motorcraft name worldwide for its original factory equipment, which is still in use by Ford to this day.

In 1963, what remained of the Electric Autolite company merged with the Mergenthaler Linotype Company, and the Eltra Corporation was formed. The former Autolite portion (not sold to Ford) then became the Prestolite Motor and Ignition Company, later Prestolite Electric. In 1973, the Bendix Corporation had purchased both FRAM and Autolite. In 1980, the Eltra Corporation was acquired by AlliedSignal Corporation, which was itself acquired by Honeywell in 1999. Bendix was acquired by Allied in 1983, thereby bringing the former Ford property (Autolite) back to its original parent (the remnant of Electric Autolite in Eltra) under Allied (under Honeywell). In 2011, Honeywell sold its automotive Consumer Products Group to Rank Group, which introduced FRAM Group, a manufacturer of small, replaceable auto parts, and several other companies to take over the operations and the transfer of ownership of the acquired trademarks.

In September 2025, Autolite's then-parent company, First Brands Group, filed for Chapter 11 bankruptcy after substantial losses in revenue, listing assets between $5 billion and $10 billion and liabilities between $10 billion and $50 billion.

On January 26, 2026, First Brands announced that it would be winding down its Autolite, Brake Parts, Inc., and Cardone subsidiaries after being unable to secure funding and complete a sale for the three companies.

On April 16, 2026, Premium Guard, Inc. announced that it completed its acquisition of several brands including Autolite.

== Manufacturing location of Autolite spark plugs ==
Most Autolite spark plugs are manufactured in China, where FRAM GROUP OPERATIONS LLC Imports from SHANGHAI SWEET AUTO PARTS CO LTD in through the Port of Oakland; some are made in FRAM Group's factories in Greenville, Ohio, and Albion, Illinois, USA.

== See also ==
- Auto-Lite strike (1934)
