= Tricolor (company) =

Defunct American subprime auto lender

- Type: Private
- Industry: Automotive
- Founded: 2007; 19 years ago in Dallas, Texas, U.S.
- Founder: Daniel Chu
- Defunct: September 2025; 1 year ago
- Fate: Chapter 7 bankruptcy
- Headquarters: 6021 Connection Drive; Irving, Texas, United States
- Area served: United States
- Key people: Daniel Chu (founder, former CEO); David Goodgame (former COO); Jerome Kollar (former CFO); Ameryn Seibold (former director)
- Services: Loans, car retail
- Number of employees: 1000
- Website: tricolorholdings.com at the Wayback Machine (archived July 23, 2025)

Tricolor was an American subprime auto lender and used car retailer based in Irving, Texas. The company filed for bankruptcy and liquidation in September 2025. Various executives were charged with fraud by the Securities and Exchange Commission (SEC) and United States Attorney's Office.

== History ==
Tricolor was founded in Dallas, Texas in 2007 by Daniel Chu. The company focused primarily on providing auto loans in the southwestern United States to lower-income Hispanic communities.

In 2019, Tricolor was awarded a designation as a Community Development Financial Institution (CDFI) by the U.S. Treasury Department. In a press release, CEO Chu stated that "we are humbled and honored to join this exclusive group of CDFIs as named by the U.S. Department of the Treasury. It truly speaks to the essence of our mission-driven work and will enable us to grow in service to even more deserving individuals."

In May 2020, Kroll Bond Rating Agency upgraded the ratings of three of Tricolor's asset-backed security (ABS) classes that had been issued in 2018. Kroll cited "increased credit enhancement" as the reason for the ratings upgrade.

== Fraud charges ==
=== Before bankruptcy ===
In 2018, four of Tricolor's executives allegedly began conspiring to defraud investors and lenders: Daniel Chu (founder and CEO), Jerome Kollar (CFO), David Goodgame (COO), and Ameryn Seibold (senior director of finance). Later, in charges brought by the Securities and Exchange Commission (SEC), the SEC claimed that Tricolor had raised $1.9 billion via ABS offerings between 2020 and 2025.

In the summer of 2025, lenders allegedly began approaching Chu with questions about Tricolor's collateral. The SEC claims that the executives began conspiring to determine how to conceal or explain the fraud. In a recorded phone call, Chu "compared Tricolor’s circumstances to the circumstances of Enron" and the accounting scandal that resulted in the energy company's failure.

In September 2025, Tricolor filed for Chapter 7 bankruptcy, an immediate move towards liquidation.

=== Charges filed ===
In December 2025, the United States Attorney's Office filed criminal charges against Tricolor's executives. In the indictment, the office stated that "at Chu's direction, multiple Tricolor executives repeatedly double-pledged collateral to multiple lenders and manipulated the characteristics of collateral to make ineligible, near-worthless assets appear to meet lender requirements." Tricolor had allegedly pledged $2.2 billion of collateral to investors, while only possessing $1.4 billion in real collateral.

On 24 June 2026, Goodgame pled guilty to six criminal counts, including bank fraud, securities fraud, wire fraud, conspiracy and making false statements. Goodgame stated that he is willing to "cooperate with prosecutors and may testify against Chu in hopes of leniency when he’s sentenced." The same day, prosecutors filed additional charges against Chu, raising the total to eight charges. Chu has continued to plead not guilty.

On 18 August 2026, the SEC charged Chu, Kollar, and Seibold for their roles in an alleged multi-year scheme to defraud investors by double pledging hundreds of millions of dollars of subprime auto loans to multiple asset-backed securities offerings and lenders.

=== Aftermath of bankruptcy ===
At the time of Tricolor's liquidation in September 2025, $945 million in principal was owed to bond investors. Barclays and Fifth Third Bank, both of whom provided revolving lines of credit to Tricolor, experienced millions of dollars in losses. In October 2025, JPMorgan Chase revealed that it had taken a $170 million loss due to Tricolor.

In June 2026, a federal court dismissed a lawsuit filed by Tricolor investors against Fifth Third Bank, JPMorgan, and Barclays. The 36 plaintiffs included funds managed by Janus Henderson, Ellington Capital Management, and One William Street Capital Management. The lawsuit alleged that the banks failed to address warning signs of fraud.

== Similar cases ==
Tricolor's bankruptcy has been compared to the 2025 and 2026 bankruptcies of First Brands Group and Market Financial Solutions respectively. Both companies are also facing allegations of fraud.

Jamie Dimon, chief executive of JPMorgan, stated that Tricolor's bankruptcy may be indicative of a larger problem in the private credit sector: "my antenna goes up when things like that happen. I probably shouldn’t say this but when you see one cockroach, there’s probably more."

== See also ==
- Enron scandal
- First Brands Group
- Market Financial Solutions
- Taylor, Bean & Whitaker
- 2025–2026 private credit crisis
