= Trico Plant No. 1 =

- U.S. National Register of Historic Places
- New York State Register of Historic Places
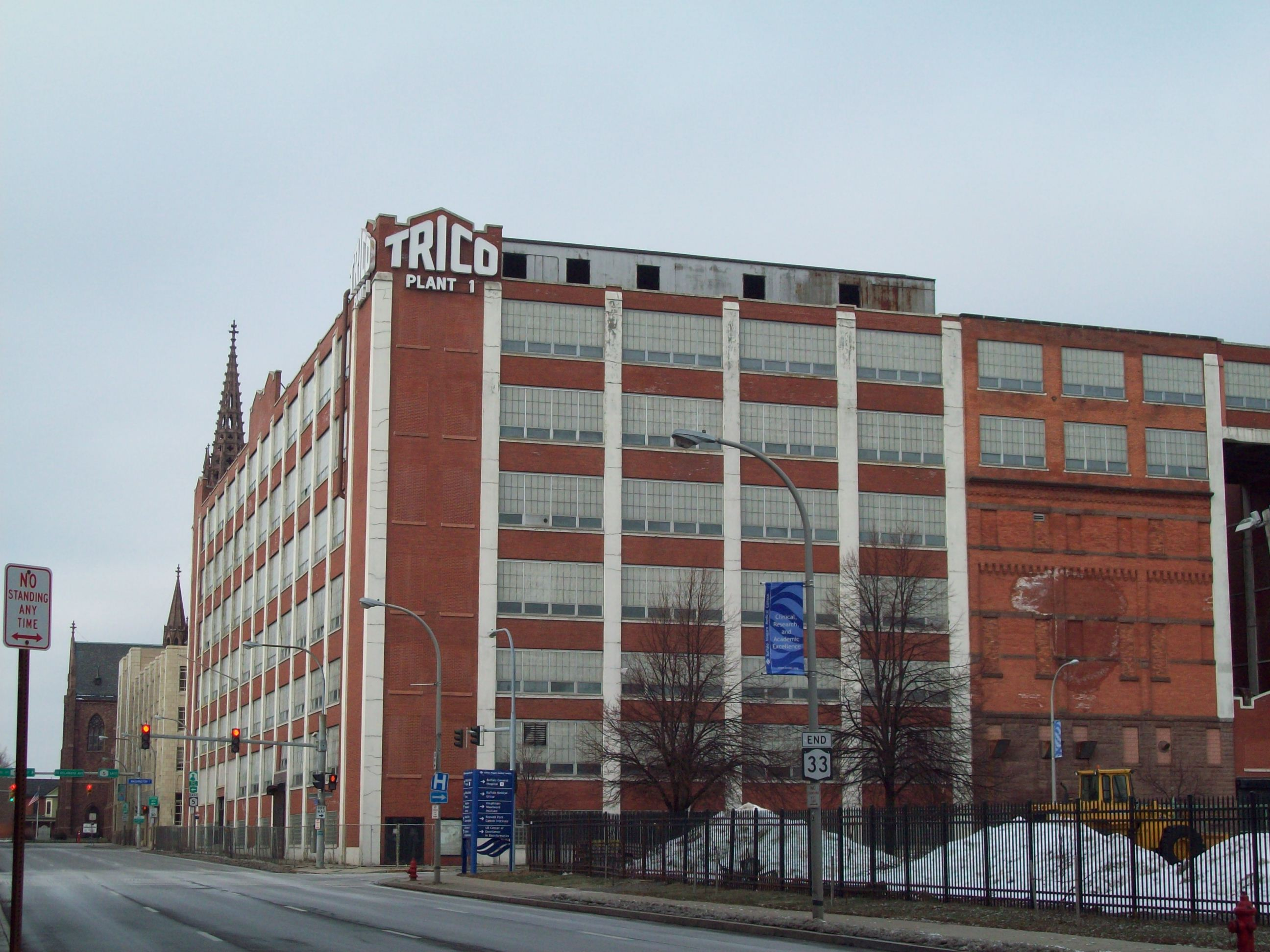
- Trico Plant No. 1, December 2009

- Location within New York Location within the United States
- Location: 817 Washington St., Buffalo, New York
- Coordinates: 42°53′42″N 78°52′10″W
- Area: 580,000 square feet
- Architects: Plummer and Mann; Burton and Ellicott
- Architectural style: Daylight Factory
- NRHP reference No.: 01000053
- NYSRHP No.: 02940.010867

Significant dates
- Added to NRHP: February 2, 2001
- Designated NYSRHP: December 13, 2000

Trico Plant No. 1 is an historical building located in Buffalo, New York. Originally a factory that produced windshield wipers, it was converted in 2024 to apartments. It is an example of a style of architecture sometimes referred to as the daylight factory, a style for which Buffalo is well known. The building was mostly constructed in the 1920s and 1930s of reinforced concrete and features curtain walls of metal sash windows and brick spandrels, although a portion of the plant incorporates an historic brewery building from the 1890s. It was the original home of Trico Products Corporation, the first manufacturer of windshield wipers, and was an important factory during a period when Trico was the largest employer in the city of Buffalo. The building is also known for once being the office of John R. Oishei (1886–1968), the company's founder and an industrialist who went on to become one of the most important philanthropists in the Buffalo Niagara Region.

The Trico business continued to operate at the building until 1998, when, after having transferred most of its manufacturing facilities to Texas and Mexico, the company moved out of the building. In 2003, plans were developed and conditionally approved by the New York State Historic Preservation Office to reuse the building as a mixed residential and commercial structure. That developer subsequently died, and in 2007 the property was purchased by the Buffalo Niagara Medical Campus (BNMC). After sitting dormant for another four years, it was reported that BNMC planned demolition of about 95% of the building beginning on April 15, 2012 (saving only the brewery building). Meanwhile, community groups called attention to BNMC's refusal to conduct an adaptive reuse study or evaluation process prior to demolition to assess the feasibility of building reuse.

Trico Plant No. 1 was listed on the National Register of Historic Places in 2001.

In 2019, large portions of the southernmost (1890-1937) sections of the building were demolished; the remaining portions were renovated into a mixed-use complex with loft apartments.

== History ==
The Trico Plant No. 1 was the first factory built by Trico, which went on to become a major manufacturer of windshield wipers. The company was founded by John R. Oishei, who in 1917 was the manager of the Teck Theater in Buffalo, when while driving in a heavy rain he struck a bicyclist with his car. This inspired Oishei to team up with John Jepson to market the windshield wiper blade Jepson had invented. The business first rented manufacturing space in North Buffalo, but in 1919 the Pierce Arrow Motor Company contracted the manufacturer to supply manually operated wipers for its luxury cars, and in 1920 Cadillac, Packard, and Lincoln did the same. The growing business, now fully owned by Oishei, purchased and moved its operations to the former ice house of the Christian Weyand Brewery at 624 Ellicott Street, recently made vacant by Prohibition.

The four-story, 40,000 square foot, brewery building's brownstone and brick facade can still be seen from Ellicott Street surrounded by newer parts of the factory, and is known as Building #1. The building was built in the 1890s for the Weyand Brewing Company at a time when several large breweries were located in what was then a German American neighborhood. Christian Weyand (1826-1898), a German-speaking shoemaker from the Lorraine region in eastern France had earlier partnered with John Schetter to start the brewing business. Shortly after his two sons joined him in the business in the early 1890s, Weyand expanded the brewery to a capacity of over one million barrels per year, and built the ice house as a storage facility. The ice house is the only surviving part of the Weyand Brewery, and Oishei's decision to adapt and reuse the brewery building preserves one of the few remnants of Buffalo's once flourishing beer-making industry.

Site plan illustrating plant components.

The company continued to expand. In 1922 the manufacturer became the supplier of automatic windshield wiper systems to Cadillac. Initial work expanding the factory began in 1924, when the Buffalo architectural and engineering firm of Harold E. Plumer and Paul F. Mann were brought on to erect a modern four-story reinforced concrete building, known as Building #2, a short distance north of the ice house building. Additional buildings followed in the ensuing decades, including two stories added above the original ice house. Later buildings replaced Buildings #4, 5, and 6, and building #10 was built prior to 1923, but was purchased by Trico in 1946. By the completion of Building #8 in the late 1930s, Trico had taken up the entire block bounded by Burton, Washington, Goodell, and Ellicott Streets. Construction dates for the different parts of the building are shown in the table below.

Trico Plant No. 1 Components
	Construction date	Style	Architect	Planned demolition date
Building #1	1890s	Traditional masonry warehouse	Unknown	June 15, 2012
Building #2	1924	Daylight factory	Plumer and Mann	April 15, 2012
Building #3	1928	Daylight factory	Burton and Ellicott	April 15, 2012
Building #7	1936	Daylight factory	Warwick R. Jewel	May 15, 2012
Building #8	1937	Daylight factory	Warwick R. Jewel	October 15, 2012
Building #9	1954	Steel framed brick	Unknown	Not planned
Building #10	prior to 1923	Steel framed brick	Unknown	Not planned

The building continued to be used by Trico for the manufacture of windshield wipers and related automotive parts until 1998, when the plant was closed. Buildings #9 and #10 were subsequently rehabilitated and used for the BNMC Innovation Center, a biomedical business incubator. The remaining parts of the plant have remained vacant.

John R. Oishei died in 1968. During his life he started a charitable foundation that has become one of the most important philanthropies in the Buffalo Niagara Region. In 2010, The John R. Oishei Foundation had $284 million in assets and contributed more than $14 million to community and medical causes in the region.

== Daylight Factory Architecture ==
The Weyand Brewery ice house from the 1890s, incorporated into the later building, can be seen from Ellicott Street and shows the contrast between traditional masonry and daylight factory architectural styles.

All of the Trico Plant No. 1 buildings except Buildings #1, #9 and #10 were built in an industrial architectural style sometimes referred to as the daylight factory. This multistory factory building style is characterized by exposed rectangular frames usually of reinforced concrete, with glass mostly replacing solid exterior wall materials. The structures are usually multistory with concrete slab floors and large, unobstructed floor space. Breaking from industrial architectural styles used in previous centuries and pioneered by architects such as Ernest Ransome and Albert Kahn in the first decades of the 20th century, the daylight factory took advantage of new materials, especially advances in reinforced concrete.

[Daylight factories] have the Vitruvian virtues of firmness, since they still stand; commodiousness, since they have proven highly adaptable to new uses after their first functions have disappeared; and delight, since they can still generate those mysterious emotions and responses that are supposed to be the prerogative of great architecture.

— R. Banham, A Concrete Atlantis

Earlier multistory industrial buildings had typically been built with load bearing masonry walls allowing only small windows, and with wood internal structures. These buildings were expensive and complex to build, with a high level expertise required in several materials. A key advantage of the daylight factory over the earlier brick and masonry factories was that windows could be much larger and simpler, without the arching or lintels required for windows in masonry walls. Additional advantages included low first cost, quick erection time, earth-quake resistance, low maintenance cost and fire resistance. Steel framed buildings offered similar advantages except for fire resistance, which by one account was the key factor for the popularity reinforced concrete over steel construction for the construction of these factories. Steel framing could be fireproofed, but unlike skyscrapers or other commercial building types, factories had no reason to cover steel framing for aesthetic purposes, and therefore fireproofing of steel beams was an additional cost that made reinforced concrete construction less expensive than steel construction.

The first complete example of a concrete daylight factory was Ransome's Pacific Coast Borax Refinery – Second Phase factory in Bayonne, NJ of 1903. The architectural style reached a fully realized form in 1906 with the Packard Automotive Plant in Detroit, and in 1907 with the Pierce Arrow Administrative Building in Buffalo. At its peak in the 1910s and 1920s, the concrete daylight factory was a dominant industrial architectural style, but by the 1930s when Trico Plant No. 1 was mostly complete, the style was becoming less common as electric lighting reduced the need for large windowed factory space and as multistory factories became less prevalent.

The daylight factory is well represented in Buffalo. In addition to the Pierce Arrow Building and Trico Plant No. 1, examples include the Larkin R/S/T Warehouse, and the Buffalo Meter Company Building. Another example, currently called the Tri-Main Center, was built by the Ford Motor Company in 1915 and later purchased by Trico and named Trico Plant No. 2.
