= 2025–2026 private credit crisis =

Since 2025, concerns in the private credit market have led to a crisis. Private credit refers to loans provided by a non-bank financial institution to a private business. While initial concerns were raised in 2024 and early 2025, the market selloff increased after Tricolor and First Brands Group declared bankruptcy and liquidation. The restrictions imposed by Blue Owl and the default of Market Financial Solutions have worsened the market's concern.

== History ==
=== Initial concerns ===
In a December 2024 letter, Senators Sherrod Brown and Jack Reed raised concerns over a lack of oversight and transparency in the private credit industry.

In June 2025, DoubleLine Capital chief executive Jeffrey Gundlach compared interest in private credit to the conditions that preceding the subprime mortgage crisis. The following month, JPMorgan Chase chief executive Jamie Dimon signaled that private credit may have reached its "peak", while Morgan Stanley chief executive Ted Pick indicated that banks had begun to expand into the private credit market.

=== Bankruptcies of Tricolor and First Brands Group ===
Tricolor was a subprime auto lender and used car retailer based in Irving, Texas. In September 2025, the company filed for Chapter 7 bankruptcy and liquidation. The United States Attorney's Office filed criminal charges against former Tricolor executives, stating that "multiple Tricolor executives repeatedly double-pledged collateral to multiple lenders and manipulated the characteristics of collateral to make ineligible, near-worthless assets appear to meet lender requirements." Tricolor had allegedly pledged $2.2 billion of collateral to investors, while only possessing $1.4 billion in real collateral.

The same month Tricolor defaulted, First Brands Group filed for Chapter 11 bankruptcy (later changed to Chapter 7). On 9 October 2025, it was reported that First Brands would be facing a federal criminal investigation by the United States Department of Justice after discovering over $2.3 billion missing. They accused the company of "double-pledging its trade receivables to third-party investors."

=== Blue Owl ===
In February 2026, Blue Owl Capital announced that it would no longer allow investors to request set amounts of money from the firm, setting off concerns about private credit.

=== Default of Market Financial Solutions ===
Market Financial Solutions was a British financial services company and mortgage lender. It entered administration in February 2026 following allegations of collateral double-pledging and a reported shortfall of approximately £930 million (US$1.3 billion).

== Responses ==
=== Industry ===
In November 2025, the chair of UBS warned that the trend of insurers shopping for better credit ratings on private credit assets was creating a "looming systemic risk" akin to the conditions that led to the 2008 financial crisis.

After Tricolor declared bankruptcy, Jamie Dimon, chief executive of JPMorgan, stated that Tricolor's default may be indicative of a larger problem in the private credit sector. "My antenna goes up when things like that happen," he stated. "I probably shouldn’t say this but when you see one cockroach, there’s probably more."

=== Political ===
In July 2025, Massachusetts senator Elizabeth Warren sent a letter to secretary of the treasury Scott Bessent and several ratings firms requesting information on risk assessment in the private credit market.

The second Trump administration has encouraged consumer exposure to private credit.
