= AlixPartners =

American consulting firm

AlixPartners LLP
- Type: Partnership
- Industry: Management consulting
- Founded: 1981; 45 years ago
- Founder: Jay Alix
- Headquarters: New York City, New York, U.S.
- Area served: Global
- Key people: David Garfield (Co-CEO), Rob Hornby (Co-CEO), Simon Freakley (Executive Chairman)
- Total assets: $2.5 billion (2016)
- Number of employees: 3700+
- Website: AlixPartners.com

AlixPartners is a financial advisory and global consulting firm. Jay Alix founded what became AlixPartners LLP in 1981. The firm has advised on some of the largest Chapter 11 reorganizations including General Motors Co., Kmart, and Enron Corp. The firm has since moved into a more traditional consulting space, and grown to a staff of over 1000. AlixPartners is headquartered in New York, and has offices in more than 20 cities around the world. They were also involved in the Bernie Madoff scandal, identifying 13,000 investors affected by the scandal for the prosecuting team.

In 2006, private equity firm Hellman & Friedman invested in AlixPartners. In 2012, CVC Capital Partners acquired AlixPartners from Hellman & Friedman. In 2016, AlixPartners was valued at $2.5 billion.

== Founding ==
AlixPartners was founded in 1981 as Jay Alix & Associates PC in Southfield, Michigan, by Jay Alix, a Detroit-area Certified Public Accountant (CPA). According to BusinessWeek, the "firm pioneered consulting to companies in or near bankruptcy". It first found public recognition in 1984, when working with the bankrupt automotive company DeLorean Motor Co, finding an additional $100 million for the company's creditors.

== Business structure ==
AlixPartners' work includes enterprise improvement consulting, financial advisory services, information management services, and executing turnarounds of distressed and healthy companies. AlixPartners has been involved in several high-profile turnaround and bankruptcy assignments including GM's Saab division, Kodak, Barney's New York, and JC Penney.

In 2006, private equity firm Hellman & Friedman invested in AlixPartners. In 2012, CVC Capital Partners acquired AlixPartners from Hellman & Friedman.

In December 2014 the firm purchased Evidence Exchange, a litigation support company.

In February 2015, AlixPartners purchased Zolfo Cooper's UK & European operations for $100 million. In November 2018, the firm completed the acquisition of independent financial advisory and interim management firm Zolfo Cooper, thereby increasing the turnaround and restructuring group to nearly 350 employees worldwide.

In January 2016, AlixPartners UK managing director and former Zolfo Cooper Europe CEO Simon Freakley succeeded Fred Crawford as the company's CEO. That year, CVC Capital Partners agreed to sell its stake in AlixPartners to company founder Jay Alix as well as Caisse de dépôt et placement du Québec, Public Sector Pension Investment Board, and Investcorp.

AlixPartners acquired Matrix Economics and Freeh Group (led by former FBI director Louis Freeh) for their investigations and compliance practices in 2020. In November 2021, AlixPartners announced a partnership with Palantir for shared clients to utilize Palantir's Foundry analytics platform. In February 2023, AlixPartners announced the acquisition of London-based advisory firm THM Partners.

== Consulting and M&A work ==
The company has built a mergers and acquisitions practice, working within large merger integration situations. Industries in which AlixPartners consults includes maritime and transportation, private equity, automotive, energy and process or oil and gas industries, and aerospace. In March 2014, AlixPartners advised on the merger between JoS. A. Bank Clothiers and Men's Wearhouse, two male clothing retailers. AlixPartners has consulted for companies including Airbus, Crocs, and William Morris Endeavor. Once hired by William Morris, AlixPartners was responsible for finding $120 million in cost-cutting measures for IMG before the two agencies merged.

In 2003, AlixPartners began working heavily in the automotive industry. Jay Alix himself worked with the Government of Japan in order to establish a business turnaround industry in Japan and business turnaround association.

In September 2014, AlixPartners began the restructuring of the Puerto Rico Electric Power Authority (PREPA). The deal allowed PREPA to access a $280 million construction fund for infrastructure improvements for the country.

In 2015, the company started its Leadership & Organizational Effectiveness practice.

AlixPartners helped Ukrainian bank PrivatBank recover over $5 billion in assets allegedly stolen by former shareholders in 2016. In response, former co-founder Ihor Kolomoyskyi filed a 2017 lawsuit against AlixPartners. The company also worked alongside Quinn Emanuel Urquhart & Sullivan and Niederer Kraft Frey in a case against Julius Baer, providing forensic services for an investigation into potential anti-money laundering and US sanctions violations.

AlixPartners has advised numerous companies affected by the COVID-19 pandemic on debt management and restructuring, including Arabtec Holding, Cineworld, and JCPenney.

In February 2026, AlixPartners was appointed as the joint administrator for Market Financial Solutions, a prominent UK property finance firm, amid one of the largest insolvency proceedings in the specialist lending sector.

== Lawsuits ==
In 1990, Jack Sanders (great-grandson of Fred Sanders) and former co-owner Filipp Kreissel, filed a $6 million lawsuit against AlixPartners and a lender. The suit was dismissed by the judge during the first day of oral arguments in August 1990, who found the suit lacked merit.

In 2014, AlixPartners accused several executives exiting the firm to join McKinsey & Company of stealing trade secrets.

In 2018, AlixPartners founder Jay Alix brought a lawsuit against McKinsey & Company, accusing the management consulting firm of misleading the bankruptcy courts about conflicts of interest. As of August 2023, McKinsey had lost its bid to end the racketeering litigation brought by Jay Alix.

== Awards ==
The firm has received many awards and recognition for their work in the consulting space, including four of its consultants being selected as winners by the Turnaround Management Association (TMA) for its prestigious "Turnaround and Transaction of the Year" awards. AlixPartners ranked No. 1 in the category "Transformation & Restructuring" in the renowned German management consulting ranking by Dietmar Fink, Top Management Consultancies 2018 and ranked No. 1 in the category "Turnaround & Restructuring" in the Swiss "Management Consulting 2019" of Gesellschaft für Management und Beratung (WGMB).

AlixPartners has also been recognized as a "Best Firm to Work For" by Consulting magazine, and one of the Best Management Consulting Firms in 2018 by Forbes. In addition to those awards, AlixPartners earned a score of 100% each year (since 2018) in the Human Rights Campaign Foundation's Corporate Equality Index, ranking as one of the "Best Places to Work for LGBTQ Equality".
