= Pierce Arrow Factory Complex =

- U.S. National Register of Historic Places
- U.S. Historic district
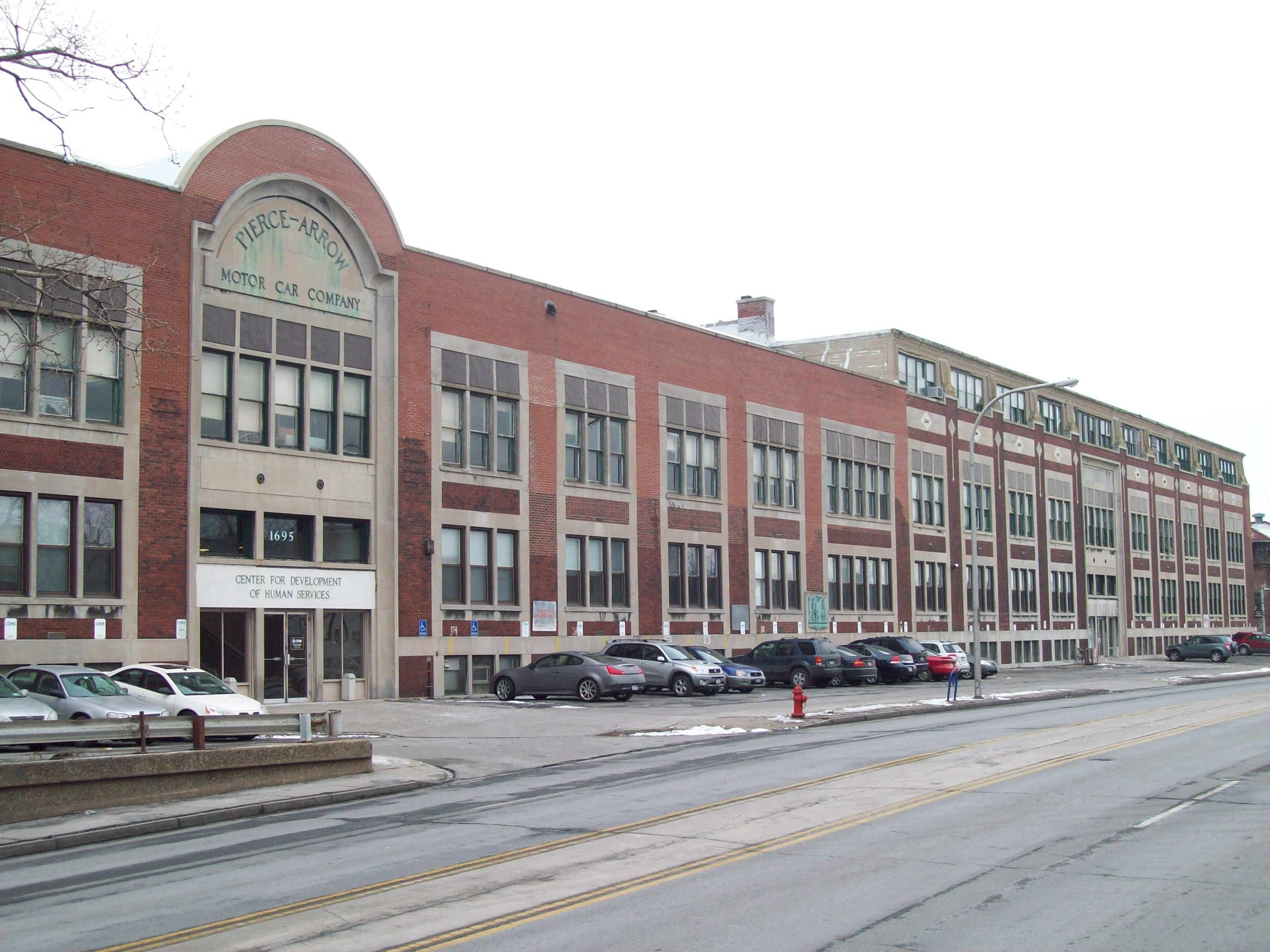
- Pierce Arrow Factory Complex, December 2009

- Location within New York Location within the United States
- Location: Elmwood and Great Arrow Aves., Buffalo, New York
- Coordinates: 42°56′34″N 78°52′26″W
- Area: 34 acres (14 ha)
- Built: 1906
- Architect: Kahn, Albert; Et al.
- NRHP reference No.: 74001234
- Added to NRHP: October 1, 1974

Pierce Arrow Factory Complex is a national historic district consisting of the former Pierce-Arrow automobile factory located at Buffalo in Erie County, New York.

== History ==
It was designed by Albert Kahn in about 1906 and served as the headquarters and production facility for Pierce-Arrow automobiles until 1938. Since then, the complex has been subdivided over the years to provide affordable space for many small companies and organizations. At one time local department store chain AM&A's operated a furniture warehouse in part of the complex.

It was listed on the National Register of Historic Places in 1974.

== Construction and features ==
Located over a 34-acre (14 ha) site, it consists of a three-story, 132,970-square-foot (12,353 m^{2}) Administration Building and an assortment of automobile manufacturing and assembly related structures. The buildings are principally constructed of reinforced concrete, and the Administration Building is considered one of the two earliest fully-realized examples of the Daylight Factory industrial architecture style (the other being the Packard Automotive Plant in Detroit).
