= Trico =

American company manufacturing windshield wipers

- Type: Private
- Industry: Automotive
- Founded: 1917
- Founder: John R. Oishei
- Headquarters: Rochester Hills, Michigan
- Area served: worldwide
- Products: Wiper blades
- Owner: Premium Guard Inc.
- Number of employees: 6,000
- Website: tricoproducts.com

Trico is an American company that specializes in windshield wipers. Trico, then known as Tri-Continental Corporation, invented the windshield wiper blade in 1917. Its original Trico Plant No. 1 is listed on the National Register of Historic Places. Trico is today one of the leading manufacturers of windshield wiping systems, windshield wiper blades and refills globally, with wiper plants on five continents.

== History ==
In 1917, the Tri-Continental Corporation was founded by John R. Oishei, Peter C. Cornell, and William P. Haines in Buffalo, New York. It introduced one of the first windshield wipers, known as Rain Rubber, for the slotted, two-piece windshields found on many of the automobiles of the time. The brand was sold on three continents: Europe, Australia, and America. It was given the telegraph and cable code name "Trico" and the company later adopted the shorter name.

In the years after the creation of the first windshield wiper, Trico was involved in the development of vacuum-powered wiper systems. Trico was involved in a patent dispute with William M. Folberth who, with his brother Fred, invented a vacuum-powered wiper motor in 1919. The patent was granted in 1922, and Trico later purchased the Folberth company to settle the dispute. Vacuum wiper motors produced by Trico carry an earliest patent number that dates back to 1928.

In 1928, as Trico Folberth Ltd, Trico opened a UK plant on the Great West Road in Brentford, Middlesex, that was situated on the so-called Golden Mile. The site closed in the late 1990s and the company relocated its UK operations to Pontypool, South Wales.

Trico also produced an air-pressure powered system for heavy-duty trucks and large military vehicles, as well as marine applications such as Chris-Craft and others where diesel engines were used. The air-pressure system uses a Trico-Folberth wiper motor that has patent dates cast into it that go as far back as 1922. Later versions of these motors carry patent numbers that show an earliest patent date of around 1936.

In 1998, Trico then moved their head office from Buffalo to Rochester Hills.

In 2002, Trico closed its original manufacturing facility, known as "Plant #1", in Buffalo, New York. This ended a nearly 20-year process of shifting its production to Mexico. In 2024, the building was redeveloped as part of the Buffalo Niagara Medical Campus into 242 apartments.

In August 2020, the company acquired Brake Parts Inc. (Raybestos) and Champion Laboratories (Luberfiner filters and Champion wipers) and renamed itself First Brands Group.

In September 2025, Trico's parent company, First Brands Group, filed for Chapter 11 bankruptcy after substantial losses in revenue, listing assets between $5 billion and $10 billion and liabilities between $10 billion and $50 billion. In 2026, Trico was sold to Premium Guard Inc. along with a group of other brands owned by First Brands for $25 million.

== Innovations ==
Timeline of company innovations:

- 1917: Rain Rubber. The first mass-produced, commercially available wiper blade.
- 1921: Automatic Vacuum Wiper motor.
- 1923: Crescent Cleaner.
- 1927: Visionall® Wiper System. Two blade wiper system (a four blade system was also offered) where the blades wiped directly sideways.
- 1928: Sleet Wand. Early attempts to fight windshield icing included this use of a rock salt-type product encased in fabric and mounted on a wiper arm.
- 1928: “Five-Ply” Blades. Multi-edge blade that used as Original Equipment on nearly every motor vehicle manufactured.
- 1928: TRICO UK Established. TRICO's UK manufacturing plant in Brentford, England, opens.
- 1929: Dual Wipers. This innovation marked the period when wiper blades began working in unison to improve visibility.
- 1936: Windshield Washer Systems. TRICO's “Two Little Squirts” pioneered the use of windshield washer fluid to keep windshields clean.
- 1953: “Arctic” Winter Blade. The precursor to today's premium winter blade, it was encased in a flexible ice-repellent hood that de-iced itself as the blade wiped.
- 1954: Four-Bar Blades. Early heavy duty wiper blades.
- 1956: Panoramic Rainbow or “P-R” Blades. The first windshield wiper blades to have an arc. A pair of spring-tensioned levers pre-flexed the blades to maintain constant pressure on the windshield. It was TRICO's most popular blade up to and through the late 1960s.
- 1957: TRICO Australia. TRICO opens an Australian manufacturing plant.
- 1959: Vacuum Rear Windshield Systems.
- 1971: Wet Wiper Arm.
- 1979: Tubular Blades. Used for the first time by Original Equipment manufacturers (introduced to the Aftermarket in 1984).
- 1980: Plastic-Framed Blade.
- 1981: Electric Rear Wiper System.
- 1993: Series 2000 Blades. TRICO's latest aerodynamic Original Equipment wiper blade.
- 1995: TRICO Exact Fit® Blade. First replacement wiper blade to install in seconds, as the blade is pre-assembled to fit the vehicle directly.
- 1996: Global Technology Center Established. This 81,000-square-foot facility is the only one in the Detroit area dedicated solely to windshield wiper technology.
- 1998: Global 1 Blade. The next generation of Original Equipment blades.
- 2000: TRICO Teflon® Blade. Exclusive wiping edge with Teflon® surface protector.
- 2002: Beam Blade. Extremely low profile, bracketless blade consisting only of a metal tension strip, rubber element and connector.
- 2005: TRICO China Established. TRICO manufacturing plant in Suzhou, China, opens.
- 2006: Direct Drive Motor. Brushless wiper motor that drives windshield wiper arms and blades without the use of linkages.
- 2007: TRICO NeoForm® Blade. Aerodynamic beam blades that fits the vast majority of vehicles on the road including those with specialty wiper arms.
- 2009: TRICO Flex® Blade. Universal beam blades with SWIFT® easy connection technology.
- 2010: Teflon® SHIELD Blade. Hybrid dual-shield™ technology with exclusive wiping edge with Teflon® surface protector.
- 2011: TRICO Force® Blade. Premium beam blade technology with advanced aerodynamics.
- 2012: TRICO Ice® Blade. Extreme winter weather blade.
- 2014: TRICO Sentry™. Premium Hybrid dual-shield™ technology blade.

== Controversy ==
Trico in Brentford Middlesex, U.K., was the scene of one of the first successful strikes over equal pay for women in May 1976. The company at the time continued to pay more to male than to female workers, and the women walked out in protest, gathering at the local Griffin pub. Trico eventually gave in after 21 weeks, offering the women workers their legal equal pay. This strike is now commemorated in a local folk song, written by Sam Richards, Totnes, Devon, UK. Its fifteen verses describe the struggle to gain legal recognition of equal pay rates.

The strike was held in the summer of 1976, the hottest and longest water drought for a hundred years. The right wing press coined the nickname "Costa del Trico," referencing the Spanish "Costa" summer holidays fashionable at the time.

Popular folk music would again note Trico 19 years later with the song "Cradle and All" from the acclaimed 1995 album Not a Pretty Girl by Ani DiFranco. Trico had been the largest employer in Buffalo, New York, and DiFranco marked the devastation the company wrought with its decision to leave the city and shift operations to Mexico.

== See also ==
- John R. Oishei
- Trico Plant No. 1
