= Private credit =

Non-publicly traded asset

Private credit is a form of lending where assets are lent by a non-bank financial institution to a private business. It is a type of alternative credit, and it is a part of the shadow banking system

Estimations of the global private credit industry's size vary; as of April 2024, the International Monetary Fund claims it is just over $2 trillion, while JPMorgan claims it to be $3.14 trillion. In 2025, Bloomberg noted it was $1.8 trillion.

== History ==
In 1994, U.S. bank underwriting covered over 70% of middle market loans. By 2020, U.S. banks issued/held around 10 percent of middle market loans. The direct lending market expanded rapidly after the 2008 financial crisis, when the SEC tightened restrictions and capital requirements on public banks. As banks decreased their lending activity, nonbank lenders took their place to address the continued demand for debt financing from corporate borrowers.

Private credit has been one of the fastest-growing asset classes. By 2017, private debt fundraising exceeded $100B. In 2024, private debt funds provided 77% of leveraged buyout debt financing globally, representing the highest share since 2015. Banks provided the remaining 23%, notably representing the lowest share for banks over the same period.

One reason for the rapid growth has been high investor demand. As of 2018, private credit strategies were averaging an 8.1% internal rate of return (IRR), with some strategies yielding as high as 14% IRR. Returns since 2000 are higher than those of the S&P 500 index. At the same time, supply increased as companies turned to non-bank lenders after the 2008 financial crisis due to stricter lending requirements. Private credit investment rose in emerging and developing markets by 89% to US$10.8 billion in 2022.

Covenant-lite loans have also become popular. This has been driven by investor demand for the relatively high yield and a willingness to accept less protections. This has resulted in fewer company restrictions and fewer investors' rights if the company struggles. That being said, for the investment firms, covenant-lite loans can also be helpful because of the negative optics if a portfolio company goes into default, and fewer restrictions means fewer ways a company can go into default.

== Investment in private debt ==
=== Business development companies ===
Much of the capital for private debt comes from business development companies (BDCs). BDCs were created by Congress in 1980 as closed-end funds regulated under the Investment Company Act of 1940 to provide small and growing companies access to capital and to enable private equity funds to access public capital markets. Under the legislation, a BDC must invest at least 70% of its assets in nonpublic US companies with market value less than $250M. Moreover, as long as 90% or more of the BDC's income was distributed to investors, the BDC would not be taxed at the corporate level. While BDCs are allowed to invest anywhere in the capital structure, the vast majority of the investment has been debt because BDCs typically lever their equity with debt (up to 2X their equity), and fixed income investing supports their debt obligations. With regards to size of the market, as of June 2021, BDC assets totaled $156 billion from 79 funds.

=== Public ===
Institutional investors make up approximately 76% of private credit investment while retail investors comprise the remaining 24%. For retail investors looking to invest in private credit, the primary method is through the publicly traded BDC market. As of April 2026, however, over 60% of BDCs are private from the average investor.

== Liquidity and redemption ==
Private credit suffers from a lack of liquidity, as a secondary market for this asset doesn't exist. This problem is compounded because private credit funds often hold illiquid assets. The International Monetary Fund notes that firms account for this through long-term lockup periods and redemption limits. Redemption refers to the investor's ability in certain funds to cash in for capital. In 2026, concerns about withdraws rose after some private credit funds began to place restrictions on redemption and hit redemption caps.

== Direct lending ==
Direct lending is a type of private debt in which lenders other than banks make loans to companies without intermediaries. This can include an investment bank, a broker, or a private equity firm. In direct lending, the borrowers are usually smaller or mid-sized companies, also called mid-market or small and medium enterprises, rather than large, publicly listed companies. Lenders are generally asset management or private debt fund manager firms. Direct lending funds use leverage, but generally less than banks or collateralized debt obligation funds (CDO/CLO).

While private debt primarily focuses on investing at the top of the capital structure, primarily in senior debt with less risk, direct lending includes both senior debt and unitranche debt. Quarterly interest payments drives a constant cash flow stream throughout the deal life. The assets under management (AUM) in Private Credit has grown by almost 4 times over the past decade. Private Credit metrics are proxied by Direct Lending which has exhibited strong performance through economic cycles. CalPERS references a Direct Lending benchmark as represented by the Cliffwater Direct Lending Index having market size of $263 billion as of December 2022.

The market has grown in importance since around 2009 in response to banks reducing their lending activities after the 2008 financial crisis. The need for direct lending has been put at €100 billion in Europe alone between 2013 and 2015. However, other sources report that in 2014 asset managers are struggling to find enough direct lending opportunities to invest in.

Asset managers cite the higher returns available from direct lending strategies as a main reason that people should invest in direct lending. US pension funds are among the investors who are reported to have made allocations to direct lending strategies, especially in Europe. Several European governments have taken initiatives to boost direct lending to smaller companies since the 2008 financial crisis. For example, in 2012, the UK government introduced a scheme to lend £700 million of public money to smaller companies in partnership with asset managers.

A large number of asset management firms have started funds to invest in direct lending, and several US firms have targeted European direct lending since around the start of 2013. Direct-lending funds raised $129.15 billion in the first nine months of 2026, up 35% from the same period in 2025. This was the highest total for the first nine months of any year in Preqin's records, which date back to 2016.

== Concerns ==
In September 2025, both car parts supplier First Brands Group and subprime auto lender Tricolor declared bankruptcy. Both were charged with fraud by the federal government. These companies' collapses and the subsequent media coverage of private credit exposure led to an uptick of investors requesting their cash back in the final months of 2025. Some private credit executives criticized the association between the collapse of First Brands with private credit, arguing that only 2% of First Brands' US$12 billion balance sheet was associated with private credit.

The growth of the European private credit market has faced scrutiny, which has intensified in the wake of the 2026 collapse of London-based lender Market Financial Solutions, which left institutional creditors facing substantial exposures.

== Regulation and oversight ==
Private credit has sparked growing regulatory attention in response to its rapid expansion and relatively scarce oversight in comparison to other traditional banking institutions. Some organizations, including the International Monetary Fund (IMF), have emphasized a need for greater government supervision and public transparency. Specific stress is put on the quality of loans and credit provided, with private credit firms rarely publishing valuations. In addition, research from the Federal Reserve Bank of Boston brings up how the move from bank lending to private credit could affect financial stability as private credit has the ability to accept riskier loans. As of March 30th, the Federal Reserve under Jerome Powell maintains observation over the practice, stating that the possibility of largescale financial impact is still relatively minor.

Regulators have also raised concerns that problems with private lenders could affect the wider credit market. US congressional research particularly has identified illiquidity and redemption caps as particular points of concern.

=== Risk management and technology ===
As the private credit market expanded, institutional investors and asset managers increasingly adopted specialized portfolio management and risk analytics software. Platforms such as BlackRock's Aladdin have expanded functionality to support private debt, enabling investors to analyze credit risk, track illiquidity, and manage valuation metrics across private market portfolios alongside traditional public assets. Private credit portfolio management platforms can also support covenant monitoring, borrower financial data organization, portfolio-level analysis, and risk identification as investment portfolios grow.

== See also ==
- Shadow banking system
- Private-equity secondary market
- Floating interest rate
- Mezzanine capital
- Venture capital
- Revenue-based financing
- History of private equity and venture capital
