= FRAM (brand) =

American brand of automotive replacement parts

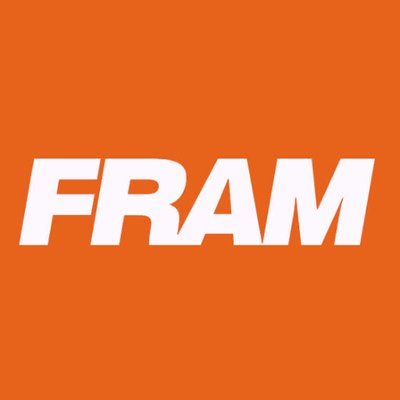
- Industry: Automotive
- Founded: 1932
- Headquarters: Memphis, Tennessee, U.S.
- Parent: Premium Guard Inc.
- Website: https://www.fram.com/

FRAM is an American brand of automotive replacement parts offering oil filters, air filters, fuel filters, and similar products.

As of 1936, FRAM produces original equipment for automotive manufacturers.

== History ==
FRAM was founded by James Bigwood (treasurer) and Steve Wilson(President) of Providence, Rhode Island in the 1930s. James Bigwood sat in his basement and decided on the orange and black colors that have continued to stay with Fram. They hired scientists T. Edward Aldham and Frederick Franklin in 1932, to develop a replaceable oil filtering element. The company's name is a blend of Franklin and Aldham. FRAM incorporated in 1934, averaging a production of ten filters per day. In 1936, FRAM began its partnership with automotive manufacturers, becoming original equipment on the 1936 Studebaker. In 1945, FRAM received the Army-Navy "E" Award becoming the exclusive manufacturer for filter development. FRAM opened the industry's largest filtration engineering and research facility in 1973.

In September 2025, FRAM's former parent company, First Brands Group, filed for Chapter 11 bankruptcy after substantial losses in revenue, listing assets between $5 billion and $10 billion and liabilities between $10 billion and $50 billion.

On June 17th, 2026, Premium Guard Inc. acquired the FRAM brand assets from First Brands Group. They also purchased key manufacturing equipment from the legacy FRAM facility in Greenville, Ohio.

== Advertising ==
FRAM introduced its first slogan, "The Dipstick Tells the Story" in 1942. FRAM introduced its iconic slogan, "You can pay me now, or pay me later" in 1971.
