= Church station (Buffalo Metro Rail) =

Light rail station in Buffalo, New York

Church
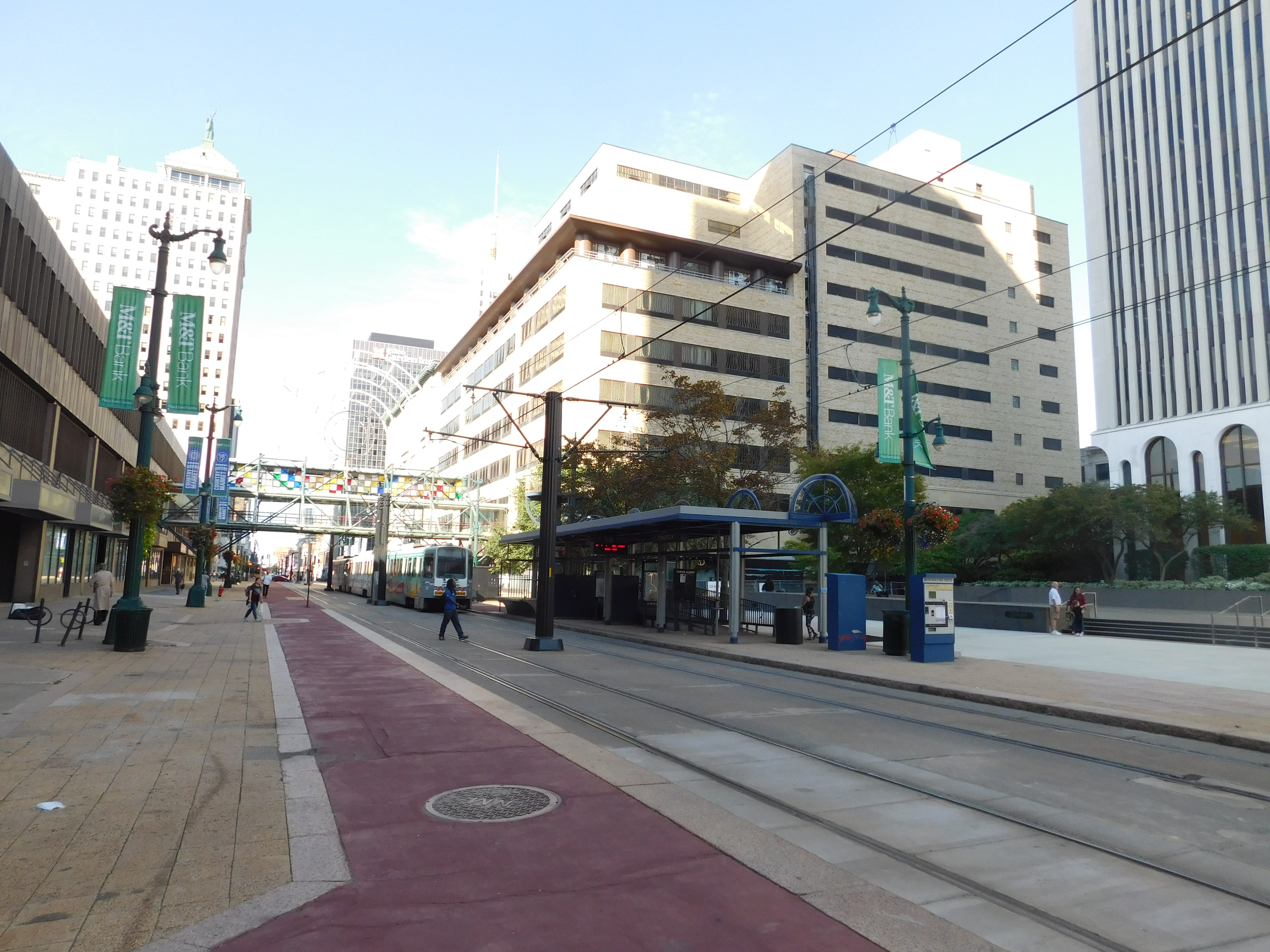
- Church station's outbound platform in September 2019

General information
- Location: 345 Main Street; Buffalo, New York 14202
- Coordinates: 42°53′01″N 78°52′30″W
- System: Buffalo Metro Rail station
- Owner: NFTA
- Platforms: 2 low-level side platforms
- Tracks: 2

Construction
- Structure type: At-grade
- Accessible: yes

Other information
- Fare zone: Free fare

History
- Opened: October 9, 1984; 42 years ago

Passengers
- 2017: 503,307

Services
Preceding station	NFTA	Following station
Lafayette Square toward University	Metro Rail	Seneca toward DL&W
Location

Church station is a Buffalo Metro Rail station located in the 300 block of Main Street (just north of Church Street) in the Free Fare Zone, which allows passengers free travel between Canalside and Fountain Plaza. Passengers continuing northbound past Fountain Plaza are required to have proof-of-payment. Church station is the closest to the Buffalo Metropolitan Transportation Center, located two blocks east at Ellicott and North Division Streets.

== Bus routes serving Church station ==
- At Church and Pearl Streets (heading south only):
  - 8 Main (inbound)
  - 66 Williamsville
  - 67 Cleveland Hill
  - 81 Eastside (inbound)
- At North Division and Main Streets (heading north or west):
  - 1 William (outbound)
  - 2 Clinton (outbound)
  - 4 Broadway (outbound)
  - 15 Seneca (inbound)
  - 40 Grand Island (outbound)
  - 60 Niagara Falls (outbound)
  - 61 North Tonawanda (outbound)
  - 64 Lockport (outbound)
  - 69 Alden (inbound)
  - 70 East Aurora (inbound)
  - 72 Orchard Park (inbound)
  - 75 West Seneca (inbound)
- At Church and Main Streets (heading east only):
  - 1 William (inbound)
  - 2 Clinton (inbound)
  - 3 Grant (inbound)
  - 4 Broadway (inbound)
  - 5 Niagara–Kenmore (inbound)
  - 7 Baynes–Richmond (inbound)
  - 8 Main (inbound)
  - 11 Colvin (inbound)
  - 15 Seneca (outbound)
  - 20 Elmwood (inbound)
  - 25 Delaware (inbound)
  - 40 Grand Island (inbound)
  - 60 Niagara Falls (inbound)
  - 75 West Seneca (outbound)
- At Washington and South Division Streets (heading north, south or east):
  - 1 William (inbound)
  - 2 Clinton (inbound)
  - 3 Grant (inbound)
  - 4 Broadway (inbound)
  - 5 Niagara–Kenmore (inbound)
  - 6 Sycamore
  - 7 Baynes–Richmond (inbound)
  - 11 Colvin (inbound)
  - 14 Abbott
  - 15 Seneca (outbound)
  - 16 South Park
  - 20 Elmwood (inbound)
  - 24 Genesee
  - 25 Delaware (inbound)
  - 40 Grand Island (inbound)
  - 42 Lackawanna
  - 60 Niagara Falls (inbound)
  - 66 Williamsville (outbound)
  - 67 Cleveland Hill (outbound)
  - 70 East Aurora (outbound)
  - 72 Orchard Park (outbound)
  - 74 Hamburg (inbound)
  - 75 West Seneca (outbound)
  - 76 Lotus Bay (inbound)
  - 79 Tonawanda (outbound)
- At Washington and North Division Streets (heading north only):
  - 3 Grant (outbound)
  - 5 Niagara–Kenmore (outbound)
  - 7 Baynes–Richmond (outbound)
  - 11 Colvin (outbound)
  - 20 Elmwood (outbound)
  - 25 Delaware (outbound)

== Notable places nearby ==
Church station is located near:

- Buffalo City Court
- Buffalo City Hall
- Buffalo & Erie County Public Library
- Buffalo Metropolitan Transportation Center
- Burt Flickinger Center
- Erie County Hall
- Ellicott Square Building
- Erie Community College (also Old Post Office)
- Guaranty Building
- Main Place Tower
- WKBW Television Studios

== See also ==
- List of Buffalo Metro Rail stations
