= Lafayette Square station =

Light rail station in Buffalo, New York

Lafayette Square
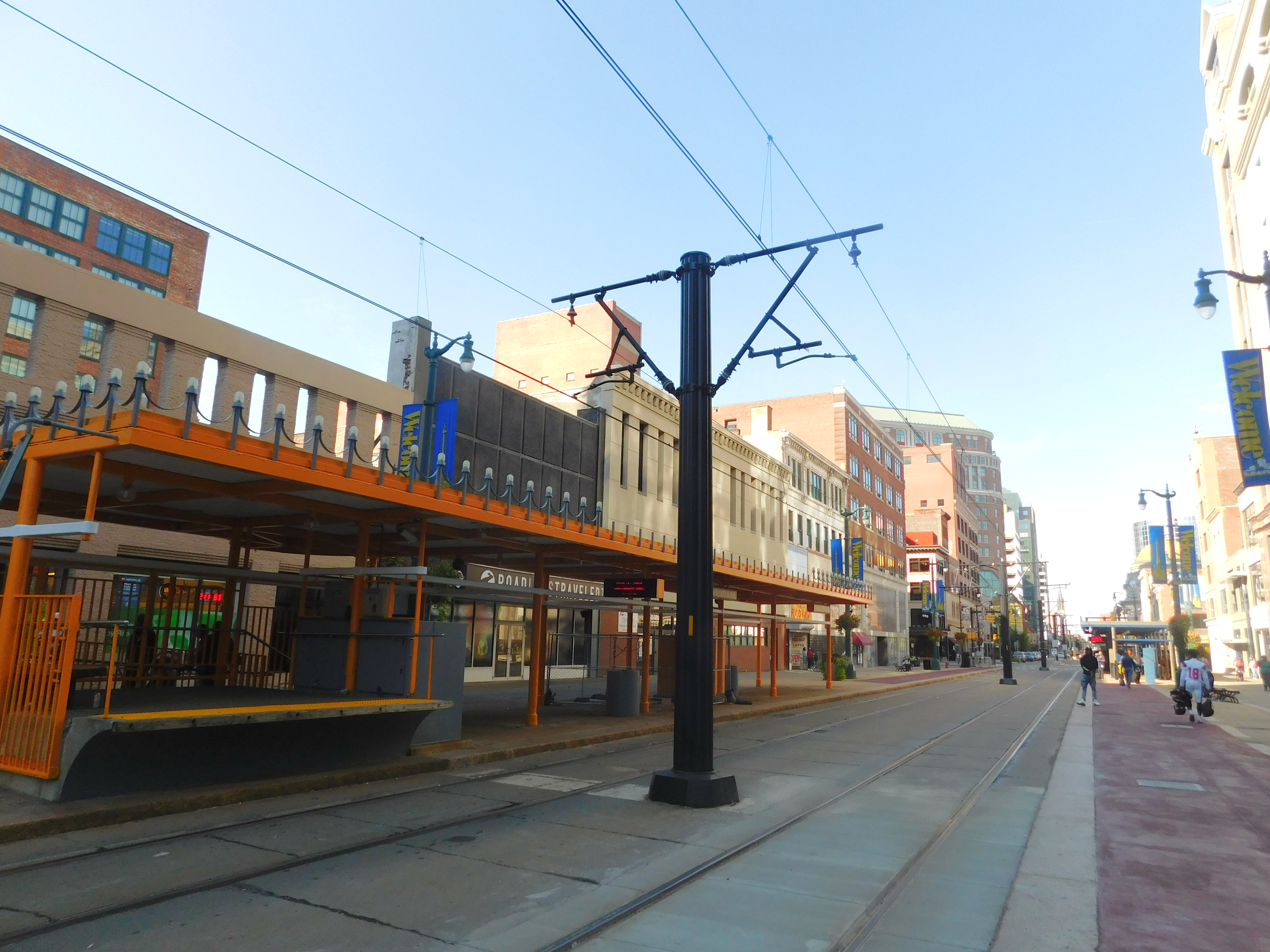
- Lafayette Square station inbound platform, September 2019

General information
- Other names: Evans Bank @ Lafayette Square
- Location: 415 Main Street; Buffalo, New York
- Coordinates: 42°53′12″N 78°52′26″W
- System: Buffalo Metro Rail station
- Owner: NFTA
- Platforms: 2 low-level side platforms
- Tracks: 2

Construction
- Structure type: At-grade
- Accessible: yes

Other information
- Fare zone: Free fare

History
- Opened: October 9, 1984; 41 years ago

Passengers
- 2017: 470,680

Services
Preceding station	NFTA	Following station
Fountain Plaza toward University	Metro Rail	Church toward DL&W
Location

Lafayette Square station (officially Evans Bank @ Lafayette Square from November 8, 2019 to November 8, 2025, for sponsorship purposes) is a Buffalo Metro Rail station near City Hall and is near the center of the Buffalo Central Business District at Lafayette Square located in the 400 block of Main Street (between Lafayette Square and Mohawk Streets) in the Free Fare Zone, which allows passengers free travel between Canalside station and Fountain Plaza station. Passengers continuing northbound past Fountain Plaza station are required to have proof-of-payment. Lafayette Square station is the closest to the Buffalo & Erie County Public Library, located one block east at Washington and Clinton Streets. On February 28, 2019, The Buffalo News announced that Evans Bank, which opened its downtown headquarters in the Main-Court Building the previous October, bought the naming rights to the station for nearly $161,000 for five years and nearly $352,000 if extended to 10 years.

== Bus routes ==
- At Court and Main Streets (heading east only):
  - 1 William
  - 2 Clinton
  - 4 Broadway
- At Court and Pearl Streets (heading east, west or south):
  - 1 William
  - 2 Clinton
  - 3 Grant (inbound)
  - 4 Broadway
  - 5 Niagara–Kenmore (inbound)
  - 7 Baynes–Richmond (inbound)
  - 8 Main (inbound)
  - 11 Colvin (inbound)
  - 20 Elmwood (inbound)
  - 25 Delaware (inbound)
  - 40 Grand Island (inbound)
  - 60 Niagara Falls (inbound)
  - 61 North Tonawanda (inbound)
  - 64 Lockport (inbound)
  - 66 Williamsville
  - 67 Cleveland Hill
  - 68 George Urban (inbound)
  - 69 Alden (outbound)
  - 74 Hamburg (outbound)
  - 79 Tonawanda (inbound)
  - 81 Eastside (inbound)
  - 204 Airport–Downtown Express
- At Lafayette Square and Washington Street (heading south only):
  - 6 Sycamore (inbound)
  - 14 Abbott (outbound)
  - 16 South Park (outbound)
  - 24 Genesee (inbound)
  - 42 Lackawanna (outbound)
  - 70 East Aurora (outbound)
  - 72 Orchard Park (outbound)
  - 74 Hamburg (inbound)
  - 76 Lotus Bay (inbound)

== Notable places nearby ==
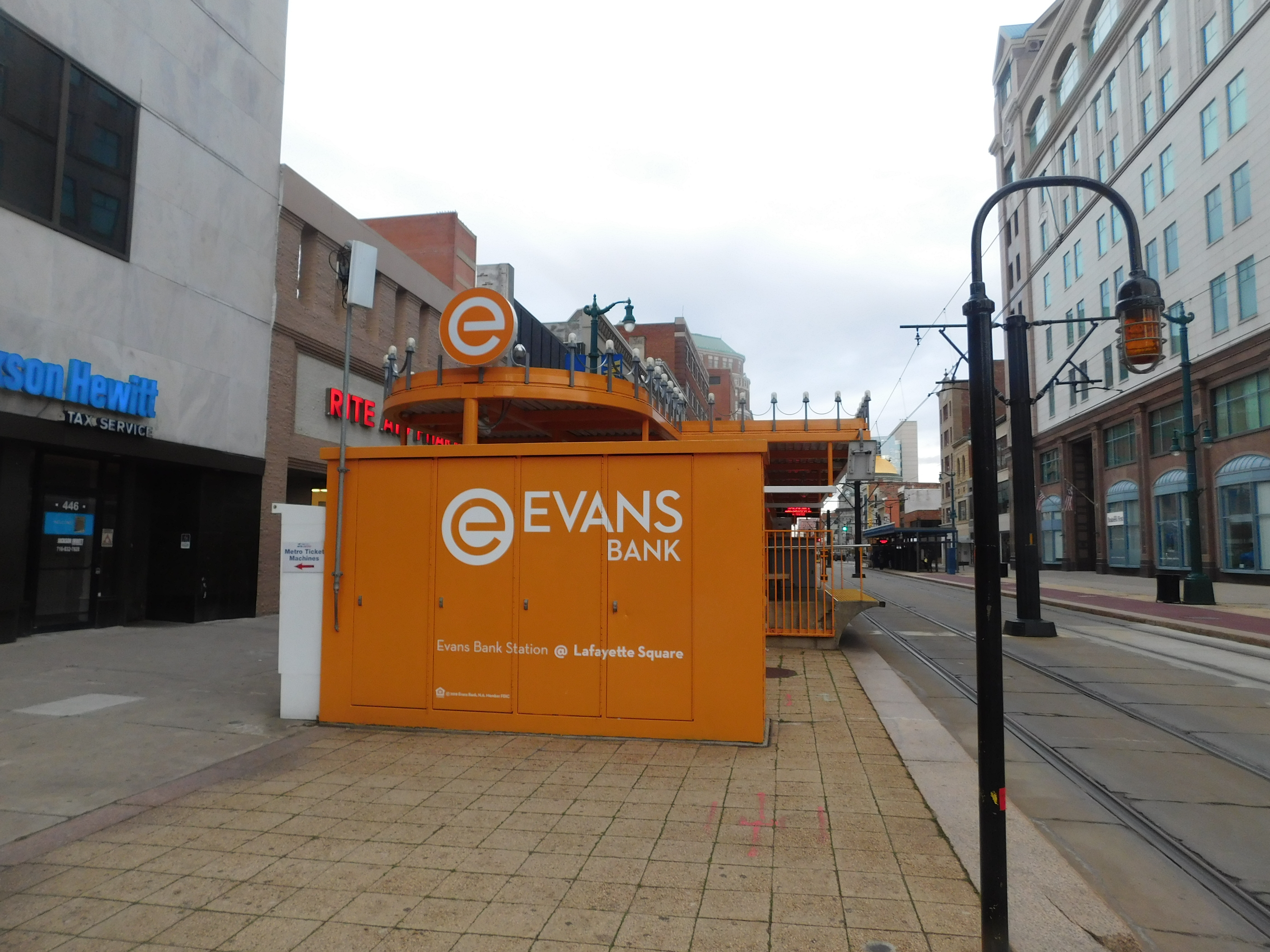
Lafayette Square station after sponsorship by Evans Bank, November 2020

Lafayette Square station is located near:

- Broadway Garage (former Broadway Auditorium)
- Buffalo City Hall
- Buffalo Convention Center
- Buffalo & Erie County Public Library (Central Branch)
- Hotel Lafayette
- Liberty Building
- Main Place Tower
- Rand Building
- Statler Hotel (now Statler Towers)

== See also ==
- List of Buffalo Metro Rail stations
