= Seneca station (Buffalo Metro Rail) =

Light rail station in Buffalo, New York

Seneca
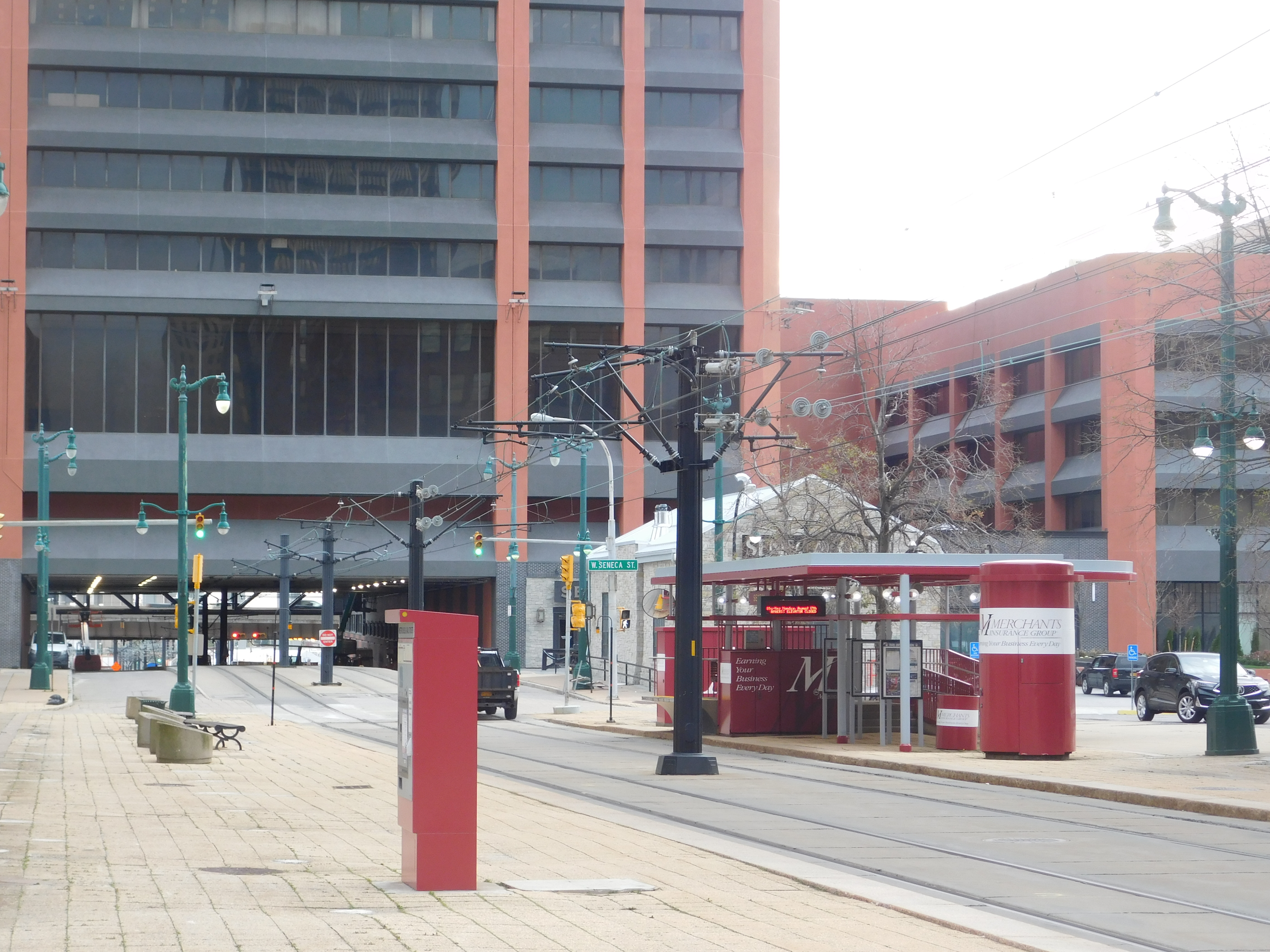
- Southbound platform of Seneca station in November 2020, after sponsorship by Merchants Insurance. Seneca One Tower is in the background.

General information
- Other names: Merchants Insurance @ Seneca
- Location: 200 Main Street; Buffalo, New York
- Coordinates: 42°52′52″N 78°52′33″W
- Owner: NFTA
- Platforms: 2 low-level side platforms
- Tracks: 2

Construction
- Structure type: At-grade
- Accessible: yes

Other information
- Fare zone: Free fare

History
- Opened: October 9, 1984; 41 years ago

Passengers
- 2017: 117,217

Services
Preceding station	NFTA	Following station
Church toward University	Metro Rail	Canalside toward DL&W
Location

Seneca station (officially Merchants Insurance @ Seneca Station since June 27, 2019 for sponsorship purposes) is a Buffalo Metro Rail station located in the 200 block of Main Street between Seneca and Swan Streets in the Free Fare Zone, which allows passengers free travel between Canalside and Fountain Plaza station. Passengers continuing northbound past Fountain Plaza are required to provide proof-of-payment. On June 27, 2019, The Buffalo News announced that Merchants Insurance, which has been located at 260 Main Street since the 1960s, bought the naming rights for $161,000 for initially five years, with the option to renew for another five years.

== Bus routes ==
- At Seneca and Main Streets:
  - 66 Williamsville
  - 67 Cleveland Hill
  - 69 Alden (outbound)
  - 79 Tonawanda (inbound)
  - 81 Eastside (inbound)
  - 204 Downtown/Airport Express (inbound)
- At Seneca and Pearl Streets:
  - 8 Main (inbound)
  - 64 Lockport (outbound)
  - 70 East Aurora (inbound)
  - 72 Orchard Park (inbound)
  - 74 Hamburg (outbound)
  - 75 West Seneca (outbound)
  - 76 Lotus Bay (outbound)
- At Seneca and Washington Streets (heading north, east or south):
  - 6 Sycamore
  - 8 Main (outbound)
  - 14 Abbott
  - 16 South Park
  - 24 Genesee
  - 42 Lackawanna
  - 61 North Tonawanda (outbound)
  - 68 George Urban (outbound)
  - 70 East Aurora (outbound)
  - 72 Orchard Park (outbound)
  - 79 Tonawanda (outbound)

== Notable places nearby ==
Seneca station is located near:

- Buffalo–Exchange Street station (Amtrak train station)
- Burt Flickinger Center
- Erie Community College, city campus (also Old Post Office)
- Sahlen Field (formerly Coca-Cola Field, Dunn Tire Park, North AmeriCare Park, Downtown Ballpark and Pilot Field)
- Seneca One Tower (formerly One HSBC Center)

== See also ==
- List of Buffalo Metro Rail stations
