= Buffalo Metro Rail =

Light rail line serving Buffalo, New York

Metro Rail

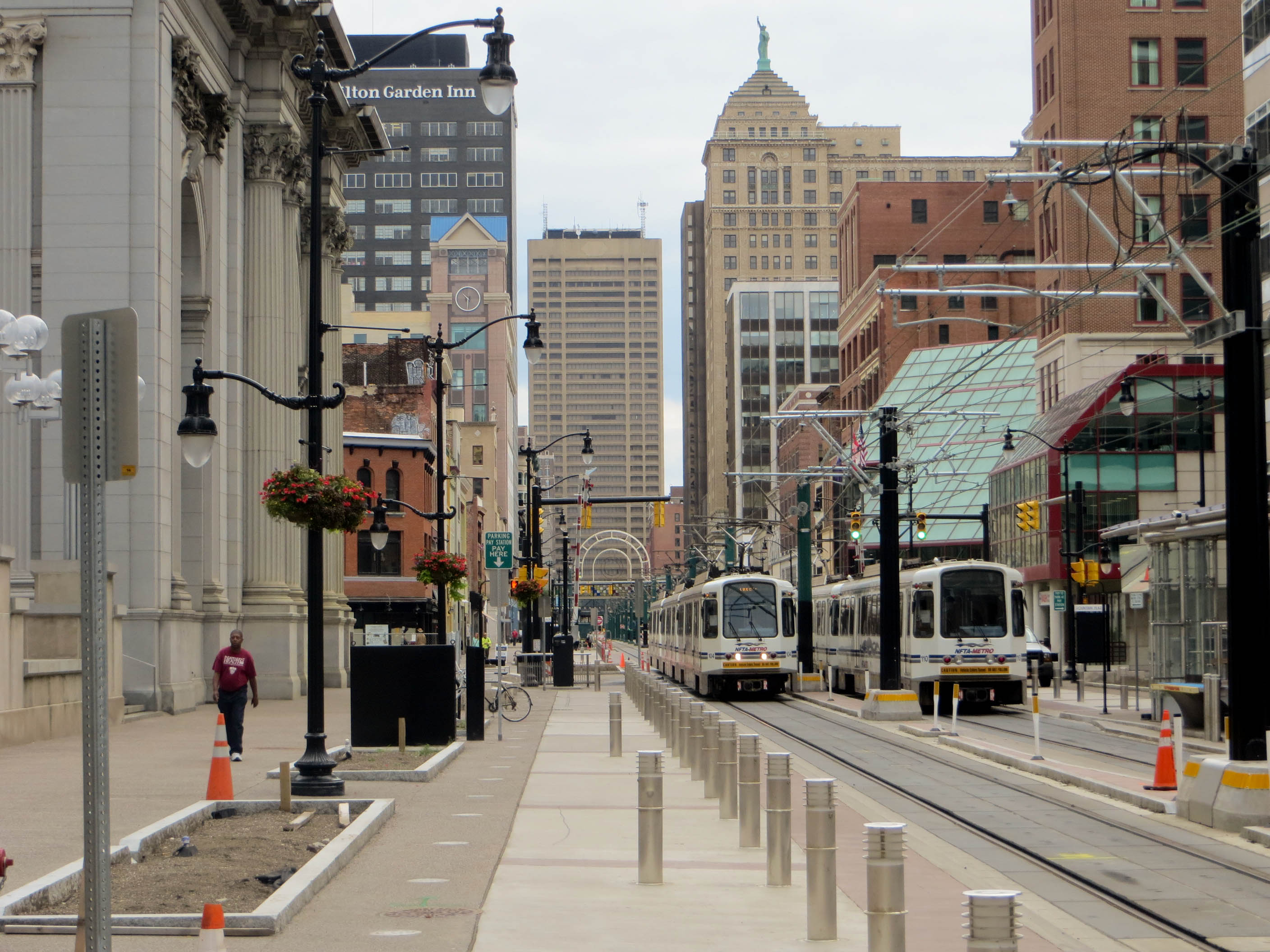
- Two typical trains at Fountain Plaza station

Overview
- Owner: Niagara Frontier Transportation Authority (NFTA)
- Locale: Buffalo, New York
- Termini: University; DL&W
- Stations: 14
- Website: metro.nfta.com

Service
- Type: Light rail
- Depot: NFTA Rail Maintenance Yard
- Rolling stock: J-TREC Buffalo LRV
- Daily ridership: 11,800 (weekdays, Q2 2026)
- Ridership: 2,453,100 (2025)

History
- Opened: October 9, 1984; 41 years ago

Technical
- Line length: 6.4 mi (10.3 km)
- Number of tracks: 2
- Character: Underground, street running
- Track gauge: 4 ft 8 1/2 in (1,435 mm) standard gauge
- Electrification: Overhead line, 650 V DC
- Operating speed: 50 mph (80 km/h)
Route map
Metro Rail highlighted in blue
Original Proposal

Metro Rail is the public transit rail system in Buffalo, New York, operated by the Niagara Frontier Transportation Authority (NFTA). The system consists of a single, 6.4-mile-long (10.3 km) light rail line that runs for most of the length of Main Street (New York State Route 5) from the new DL&W Station in Canalside, to the south campus of the University at Buffalo in the northeast corner of the city. The first section of the line opened in October 1984 as the state's only rail transit system outside of New York City after Rochester's was abandoned in June 1956. The system as originally planned was completed in November 1986 and expanded for the first time in December 2025. In 2025, the system had a ridership of 2,453,100, or about 11,800 per weekday as of the second quarter of 2026.

== History ==
=== Urban rail transit in Buffalo before 1950 ===
Streetcars and interurban railways existed in Buffalo from the 1830s to 1950, with several lines also radiating into surrounding communities such as Tonawanda, Niagara Falls and even the Niagara Peninsula in Canada. These lines merged in 1902 to form the International Railway Company in 1902. With the rise in bus usage starting in the mid-1930s, streetcar ridership declined rapidly until 1950, with several streetcar lines being shuttered over time until the rail system was eliminated altogether.

=== Planning and construction of current system ===
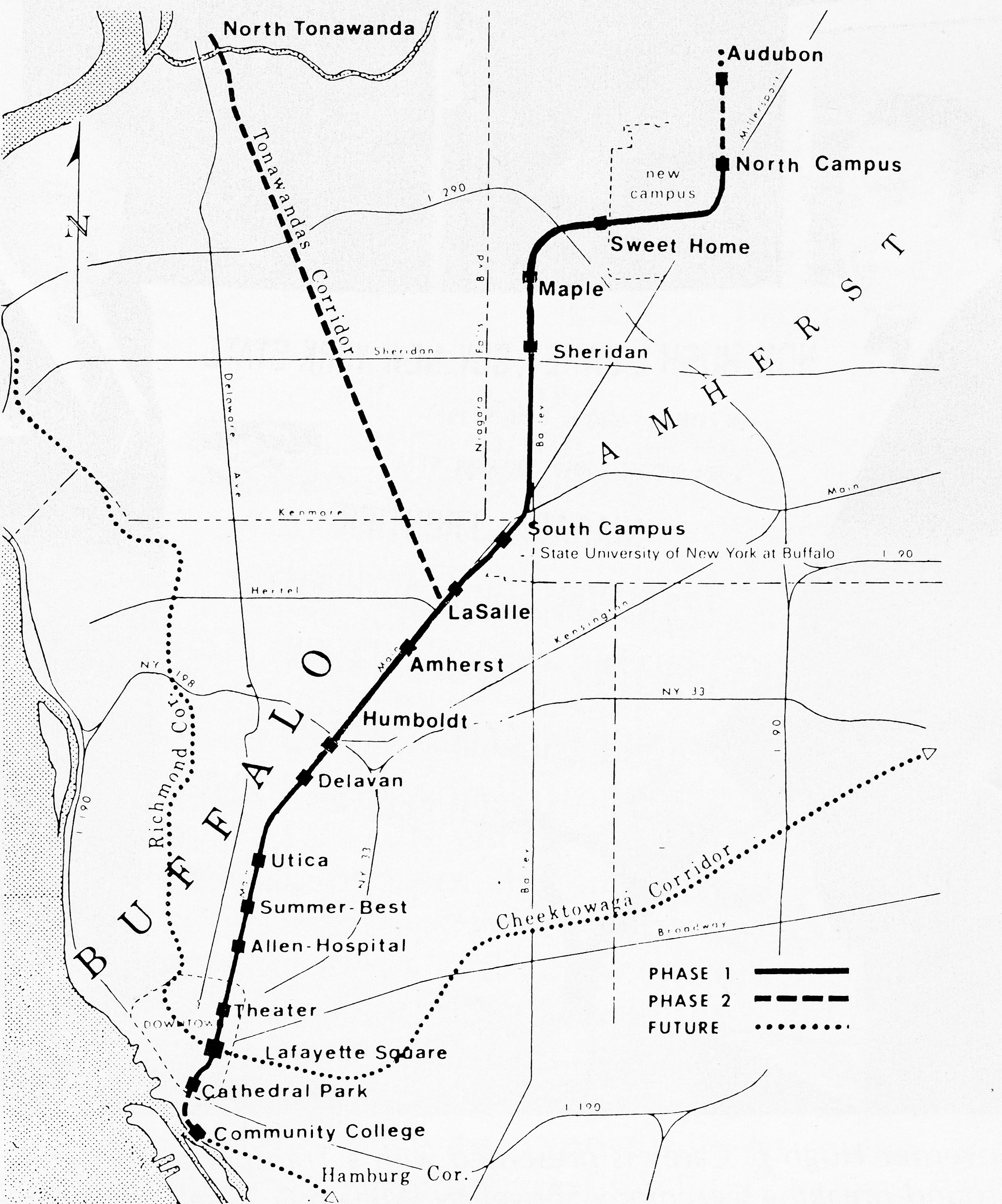
1975 "Projected rail transit route alignment"

Despite the decline of Buffalo's industry and population over the next few decades, federal funds and a desire to revitalize downtown spurred the Niagara Frontier Transportation Authority, the IRC's successor, to construct the modern Metro Rail line, starting in 1979. It came amid a surge in light rail construction in mid-sized cities nationwide, as Denver, Portland, Sacramento, and San Jose also built systems at the same time.

The line opened in stages: the surface portion opened on October 9, 1984, while the subway opened as far as Amherst Street Station on May 20, 1985, following an opening ceremony on May 18. The line was further extended to University Station, serving the University at Buffalo, on November 10, 1986, due to construction issues at LaSalle Station. At the time of the start of construction, the line was intended to be the first line for an extensive heavy rail system that would spread throughout the city and suburbs. However, during the construction of the line and afterward, Buffalo's population declined significantly by approximately 55% from around 580,000 in 1950 to about 261,000 in 2010 and the new line's ridership was much lower than originally anticipated. The cost of the urban section was so high that no funding was available to extend the lines into the suburbs, including the Amherst campus of the University at Buffalo. Efforts to obtain funding for feeder lines have historically been met with little to no success.

=== Renovations and expansion ===
Although a centerpiece of the original line, the downtown transit mall did not live up to expectations. Because of poor traffic patterns on Main Street, some business groups occasionally called for the removal of the transit system so that they can return to normal vehicle traffic and curbside parking.

In 2008, Buffalo began a project to reintroduce cars to Main Street. The project in question involved creating a shared trackbed/roadway with curbside parking, as well as the permanent closure of the Theater Station, which occurred on February 18, 2013. The closure of Theater Station meant that Fountain Plaza Station, located 546 feet (166 m) south in the 500 block of Main Street, now serves as the northern terminus of the Free Fare Zone. On January 23, 2015, after less than two years of construction, traffic was reintroduced to the 600 block of Main Street, between Tupper and Chippewa Streets, in the Theater District. On December 15, 2015, traffic was reintroduced to the 500 block of Main Street, between Chippewa and Mohawk streets, in the Central Business District. In late 2022, traffic was reintroduced to Lower Main between Exchange and Scott Street. Work began in July 2023 to complete the final stretch of Cars Sharing Main Street, with work between Mohawk and Exchange. The project is being constructed in conjunction with the total replacement of the trackbed in the 400 block as well as the installation of a crossover track to decrease the effects of single-tracking during the process.

On January 9, 2017, Governor Andrew Cuomo announced in his State of the State address that funding would be secured for the Amherst and Cobblestone line extensions. If successful, this would be the first extension in the service's history. Funding for an environmental review into the Amherst extension was approved in 2018, and it was expected to take between 24 and 30 months. The environmental study concluded in 2025 and was approved by the Federal Transit Administration in 2026, with NFTA moving forward with the light rail option over a bus rapid transit alternative, exploring funding options and estimating groundbreaking to begin in 2030.

In 2019 Tim Kennedy and Crystal People-Stokes secured a $100M state commitment to fund renovation and repair work throughout the system that had largely been delayed since the line's opening. The funding is intended for total track replacement, catenary replacements, fastener and pad replacements, as well as two station complete rebuilds (Canalside and Church) and increased passenger comfort amenities at other stations. Following the reconstruction of Church Station, expected to begin in July 2024, NFTA intends to begin the process for a redesign of the Lafayette Square station.

=== DL&W Terminal renewal ===
The Niagara Frontier Transportation Authority (NFTA) is redeveloping the former Delaware, Lackawanna and Western Railroad (DL&W) terminal to include a new indoor Metro Rail DL&W station on the first floor, adjacent to the Buffalo River, with direct access to Canalside via the Buffalo Bricks Walkway. The project replaced the Special Events station and marked the first extension of Metro Rail service since the system opened.

The station design includes capacity for two four-car trains, stair and escalator access to the terminal’s second floor. A $3 million enclosed pedestrian skybridge, partially funded with federal aid, will connect the second floor to the KeyBank Center.

NFTA partnered with developer Savarino Companies on a $30 million plan to redevelop the building’s first and second floors, totaling about 75,000 square feet (7,000 m^{2}) of indoor space and 55,000 square feet (5,100 m^{2}) of outdoor space. Although Savarino Companies ceased operations in August 2023, work on the $87 million project continued under a separate entity, Savarino DL&W Development, LLC. However, NFTA terminated the agreement with Savarino in November 2025, claiming the developer "fail[ed] to provide a viable business plan". The station and skybridge are expected to open in 2026, with the remainder of the redevelopment targeted for completion in 2027. Metro Rail service to DL&W station began on December 8, 2025.

== Operations ==
=== Route ===
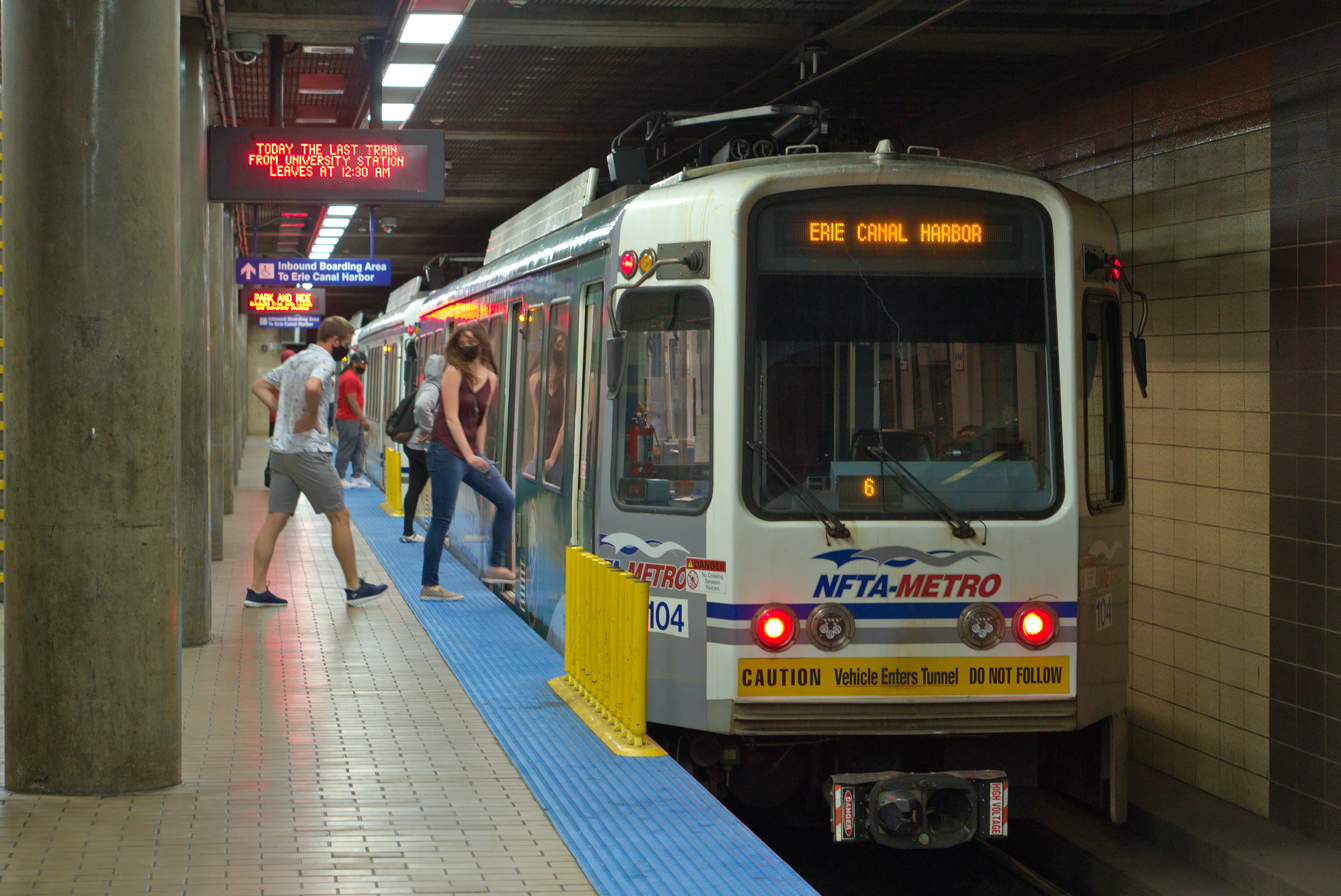
A light rail train departing Amherst Street station

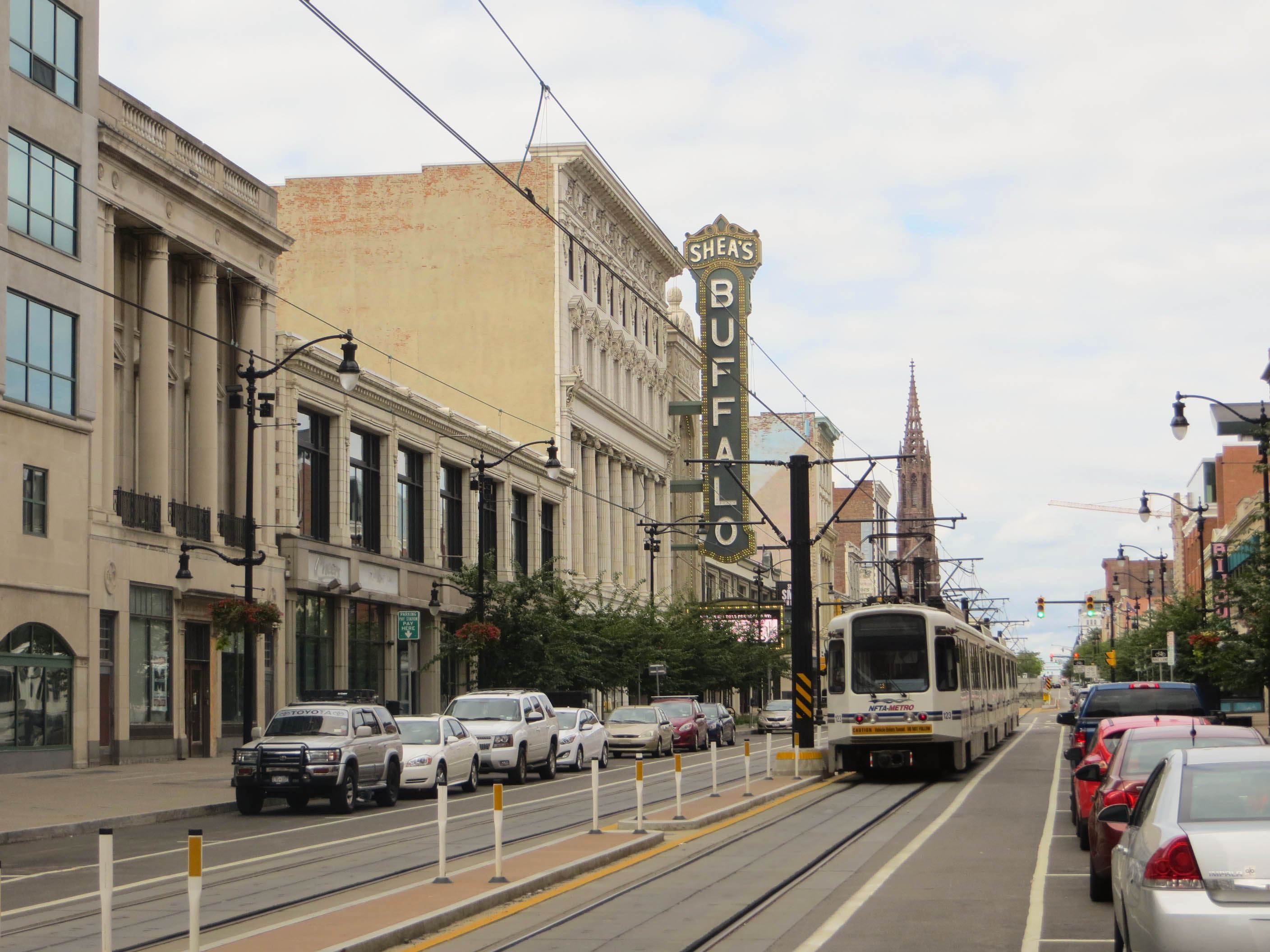
Metro Rail near Shea's Performing Arts Center

Metro Rail is a light rail transit (LRT) system as characterized by the American Public Transportation Association, although it shares some characteristics with rapid transit.

About 80% of its track (5.2 miles (8.4 km)) is an underground subway with high-level platforms. This section has eight stations that are spaced fairly widely apart, comparable to subway systems elsewhere. This section is cut-and-cover from Allen/Medical Campus to Utica, then deep-bored from Delavan/Canisius College to University. The remaining 20% of its track (1.2 miles (1.9 km)) are on the surface on Main Street in downtown Buffalo, which includes a brief underpass of Buffalo’s tallest building, the Seneca One Tower. On the surface section, trains interact with automobile traffic from the theater district where it emerges from the tunnel until Mohawk Street where it reverts to a transit mall and at cross streets, where movements are governed by traffic signals.

Metro Rail operates electric multiple-unit light rail vehicles (LRVs) in two-to-four car trains with power drawn from an overhead catenary system. Catenary poles on the surface section are spaced every 130 feet (40 m) to support the overhead electrical lines. Three-car trains are limited to rush hour and special events and four-car trains to special events. The Buffalo trains join Philadelphia's SEPTA light rail cars as the only modern non-articulated LRVs operating in the United States.

=== Stations ===
Name	Image	Type	Platform	Opened	Fare zone	Notes
University		Underground	Island	November 10, 1986	Fare-paid zone	Serves the University at Buffalo South Campus and University Heights Neighborhood.
LaSalle		Underground	Island	November 10, 1986	Fare-paid zone	Serves The North Park Neighborhood, The Central Park Neighborhood, Shoshone Park, and University Heights Neighborhood.
Amherst Street		Underground	Island	May 20, 1985	Fare-paid zone	Serves Buffalo Zoo and Darwin D. Martin House.
Humboldt–Hospital		Underground	Island	May 20, 1985	Fare-paid zone	Serves Sisters of Charity Hospital and Darwin D. Martin House.
Delavan/Canisius College		Underground	Island	May 20, 1985	Fare-paid zone	Serves Canisius University and Forest Lawn Cemetery.
Utica		Underground	Side	May 20, 1985	Fare-paid zone	
Summer–Best		Underground	Side	May 20, 1985	Fare-paid zone	Serves Theodore Roosevelt Inaugural National Historic Site and Kleinhans Music Hall.
Allen/Medical Campus		Underground	Side	May 20, 1985	Fare-paid zone	Serves Allentown and Buffalo Niagara Medical Campus.
~~Theater~~		Street level	Side	October 9, 1984	Free fare zone	Permanently closed on February 18, 2013.
Fountain Plaza		Street level	Side	October 9, 1984	Free fare zone	Serves the Chippewa Entertainment District and Theatre District.
Lafayette Square		Street level	Side	October 9, 1984	Free fare zone	Serves Buffalo & Erie County Public Library, Buffalo Convention Center and downtown Buffalo.
Church		Street level	Side	October 9, 1984	Free fare zone	Serves downtown Buffalo.
Seneca		Street level	Side	October 9, 1984	Free fare zone	Serves Sahlen Field, Seneca One Tower and downtown Buffalo.
Canalside		Street level	Side	October 9, 1984	Free fare zone	Serves Buffalo–Exchange Street station (Amtrak), LECOM Harborcenter and Canalside.
~~Special Events~~		Street level	Side	1985	Free fare zone	Limited service for events at KeyBank Center.
DL&W		Street level	Island	December 8, 2025	Free fare zone	Replaced Special Events station and serves KeyBank Center and Canalside.

=== Fares ===
Fares are collected through a proof-of-payment system, enforced through random ticket inspections. Travel is free on the above ground portion of the system. Regular fare is $2; various passes are also available for sale. All stations have ticket machines. Due to the COVID-19 pandemic, NFTA temporarily suspended fare collection starting in late March 2020. Fare collection resumed on June 29, 2020.

=== Schedules ===
Metro Rail runs as follows: Monday-Friday from 5:10 am-12:50 am, Saturdays from 7:05 am-12:50 am and Sundays and holidays from 8:00 am-11:50 pm (although most bus service is available until approximately 12:30 am). Trains run as often as once every ten minutes at rush hour and generally no less often than once every twenty minutes. In July 2008, the NFTA reported that the passenger count "eclipsed the previous year's tally by 23%." As a result, the following September, the NFTA implemented an earlier start for the weekday schedule in response to an 11% increase in ridership over eight months of growth.

== Plans for expansion ==
Routemap with proposed Tonawanda-Amherst extension

Metro Rail was ranked 25th in the nation in light rail daily ridership service in 2013, with 5,058,300 passengers. However, it is noted that the line currently lacks extended branches to the suburbs, being confined to the city limits of Buffalo. One group, the Citizens Regional Transit Corporation (CRTC), advocates for expansion. As indicated in its statement, the CRTC seeks to educate the public, public officials, their authorities, and agencies in the Buffalo-Niagara region about the benefits of a comprehensive transportation system including an expanded Metro Rail. In April 2011, the group stated that the 600 block of Main Street, which has Shea's Performing Arts Center along with hotels and bars, should be converted into a mixed automobile and rail system. The 600 block was re-opened to automobile traffic in 2015.

In December 2012, the NFTA announced it had secured funding of $1.6 million to commission a study in 2013 of bus and rail access to University at Buffalo's North Campus. If a rail project were to be approved, the system would be running in 7–10 years. On February 28, 2013, it was announced that a group consisting of representatives from the Buffalo Niagara Medical Campus, planners from the City of Buffalo, the Buffalo Sabres and NFTA are working on a plan to extend the southern terminus of the rail line just beyond the NFTA rail yard at the DL&W Terminal to a new parking garage being built near the Medical Campus.

=== Amherst corridor ===
In the December 4, 2006, edition of The Spectrum, a publication of the University at Buffalo (UB), it was announced that school president John B. Simpson was planning to get a project underway that would connect UB's North, South and downtown campuses via a transportation system. The proposed systems included a subway, trolley or light rail. A study that was published in 2014 detailed four alternatives chosen for the corridor, including a light rail corridor and three bus rapid transit corridors. The light rail corridor would extend from a turnout at University station, head north to Niagara Falls Boulevard past the Boulevard Mall, turn to Sweet Home Road, enter the University at Buffalo North Campus and parallel Interstate 990 ending at the Crosspoint Business Park in Getzville.

Planning and funding is currently underway for a northbound Niagara Falls Boulevard extension to the University at Buffalo North Campus. As of 2019, the proposed turnout tunnel to Niagara Falls Boulevard has been shortened, increasing the overall length of the street-side light rail portion of the route, and a new tunnel has been added to the design near I-290. In addition, the chosen corridor would parallel Audubon Parkway and end at a park-and-ride after passing under I-990, rather than continuing to the Crosspoint Business Park. The NFTA has also released a finalized scoping report and a draft environmental study report, and has been receiving community input on the project.

=== Airport corridor ===
The Airport corridor would begin in Downtown Buffalo, near Church station and continue in an easterly direction in/out Division Streets, diagonally in a northeastern direction near Jefferson Avenue toward the Buffalo Central Terminal, cross Broadway and then continue eastbound in its private right-of-way to the Thruway Plaza, Walden Galleria and Buffalo-Niagara International Airport.

=== Tonawandas corridor ===
The Tonawandas corridor would operate from LaSalle station northwesterly to the city of Tonawanda using the abandoned Erie Railroad tracks. The NFTA purchased 12 Presidents' Conference Committee (PCC) streetcars in the 1980s to serve the Tonawanda turn-out, a proposed Metro Rail extension to Tonawanda and North Tonawanda. These cars were built by the St. Louis Car Company and acquired by Cleveland, Ohio's Greater Cleveland Regional Transit Authority second-hand in 1953. It was determined after initial trial runs that the PCCs were too wide for existing station platforms and the plan was abandoned. The PCCs were sold to the Brooklyn Historic Railway Association (BHRA) and scrapped in 2003 when the BHRA folded.

== Rolling stock ==
Buffalo LRV
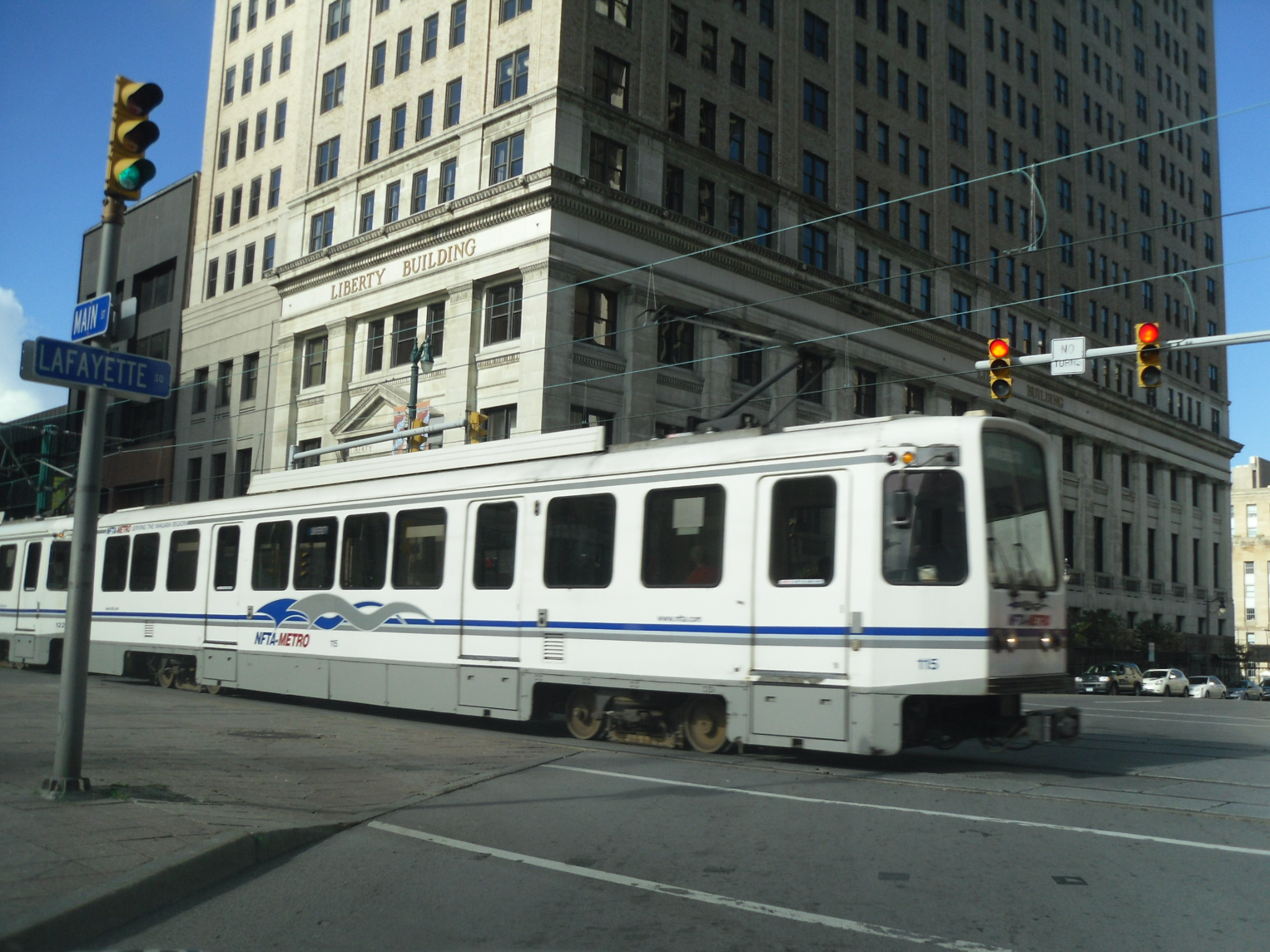

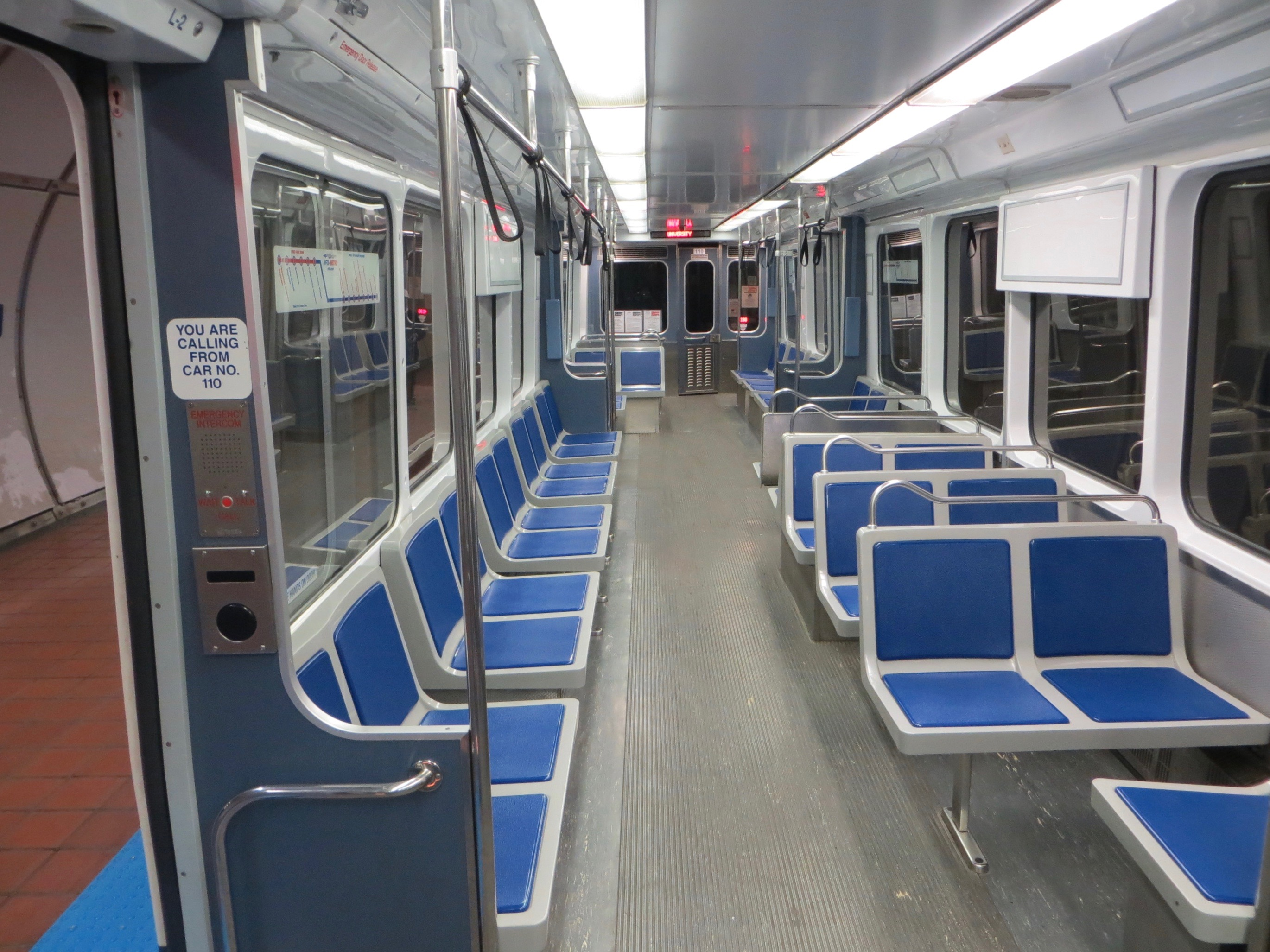
- In service: 1984−present
- Manufacturer: Tokyu Car Corporation
- Constructed: 1983
- Entered service: 1984
- Refurbished: 2012–present
- Number in service: 27
- Formation: 2 to 4–car sets
- Fleet numbers: 101–127
- Capacity: 210
- Operator: Niagara Frontier Transportation Authority
- Depot: NFTA Rail Maintenance Yard
- Line served: Main Street

Specifications
- Car length: 66 ft 10 in (20.37 m)
- Width: 8 ft 7 in (2.62 m)
- Height: 11 ft 3 in (3.43 m)
- Wheel diameter: 26 in (660 mm)
- Wheelbase: 6 ft 2 in (1.88 m)
- Maximum speed: 50 mph (80 km/h)
- Traction system: Westinghouse chopper control
- Traction motors: 4 × Westinghouse 1463D 135 hp (101 kW) DC motor
- Power output: 540 hp (400 kW)
- Transmission: 7.130:1 gear ratio (2-stage reduction)
- Acceleration: 3.0 mph/s (4.8 km/(h⋅s))
- Deceleration: Service: 3.0 mph/s (4.8 km/(h⋅s)); Emergency: 4.0 mph/s (6.4 km/(h⋅s))
- Electric systems: Overhead line, 650 V DC
- Current collection: Pantograph
- UIC classification: Bo′Bo′
- AAR wheel arrangement: B-B
- Coupling system: Scharfenberg coupler (Dellner)
- Track gauge: 4 ft 8 1/2 in (1,435 mm) standard gauge

The NFTA has a fleet of 27 (originally 29) rigid-bodied (non-articulated) LRVs for the Metro Rail system, numbered sequentially from 101 to 127. They were built in 1983 by Tokyu Car Corporation (now known as Japan Transport Engineering Company). The cars' body shell design is notably similar to that of the earlier articulated US Standard Light Rail Vehicle, whose shells were also fabricated by Tokyu Car Corp. for Boeing Vertol. The cars have a maximum service speed of 50 miles per hour (80 km/h), but trains run at 15 miles per hour (24 km/h) in the above-ground section of the line. There are three sliding doors on each side of each LRV; these doors can be opened by passengers by push buttons on the outside wall of the train when trains are stopped at stations on the above-ground section of the line. However, in practice, train operators typically open all doors and extend all the retractable staircases at all above-stations. The NFTA acquired twelve PCC streetcars from the Greater Cleveland Regional Transit Authority in 1990 for service on the never-built Tonawandas branch. They were later sold to the Brooklyn Historic Railway Association in 2003.

=== Rehabilitation ===
In May 2006, it was announced that all of the LRVs would be rehabilitated by AnsaldoBreda. The rehabilitation featured many improvements, including enhanced video monitoring of the railcar interiors, an upgraded braking system, rebuilt HVAC systems, rebuilt door systems, a new interior closely representing the agency's new look, upgraded propulsion systems and repairs to the body shells. In addition, the rail cars were to receive new monitoring systems, an automated announcement system calling out stations, new door chimes and interior/exterior LED signage to replace existing roll signs. The total project cost was estimated at $40 million for rehabilitation of the 27 cars.

Because the refurbished cars have new car-to-car communications equipment, they are not compatible with unrefurbished cars and cannot run with them on the same line. The project originally planned to use SuperSteel's manufacturing facilities in Schenectady, New York, for the overhaul. However, due to the loss of orders and a dip in the economy, SuperSteel closed the facility in April 2009. The closure cost 175 jobs and delayed the rehabilitation. The project later was moved to Gray Manufacturing Industries, located in Hornell, New York. The first two cars were due back in revenue service in July 2010.

After a lengthy delay, which put the project years behind the original schedule, the first two cars (fleet numbers 114 and 123) were returned to service on March 9, 2012. However, the cost of refurbishment per car had since gone up and now averaged $1.7 million per car with a total cost of $45 million to complete all cars in the fleet. Three more cars (numbers 110, 111 and 126) were sent out and were expected to be completed before the end of 2012, but did not return to service until the fall of 2013. On October 1, 2014, car 113 also returned to service. By May 2021, 26 cars had been refurbished and the program was planned to end with a total of 27 (the entire fleet), with completion predicted for around July 2021. The refurbishment is expected to extend the life of each car by 15 years.

== See also ==
- List of tram and light-rail transit systems
- List of routes of City of Buffalo streetcars
