= Buffalo Convention Center =

Convention center in Buffalo, New York, United States

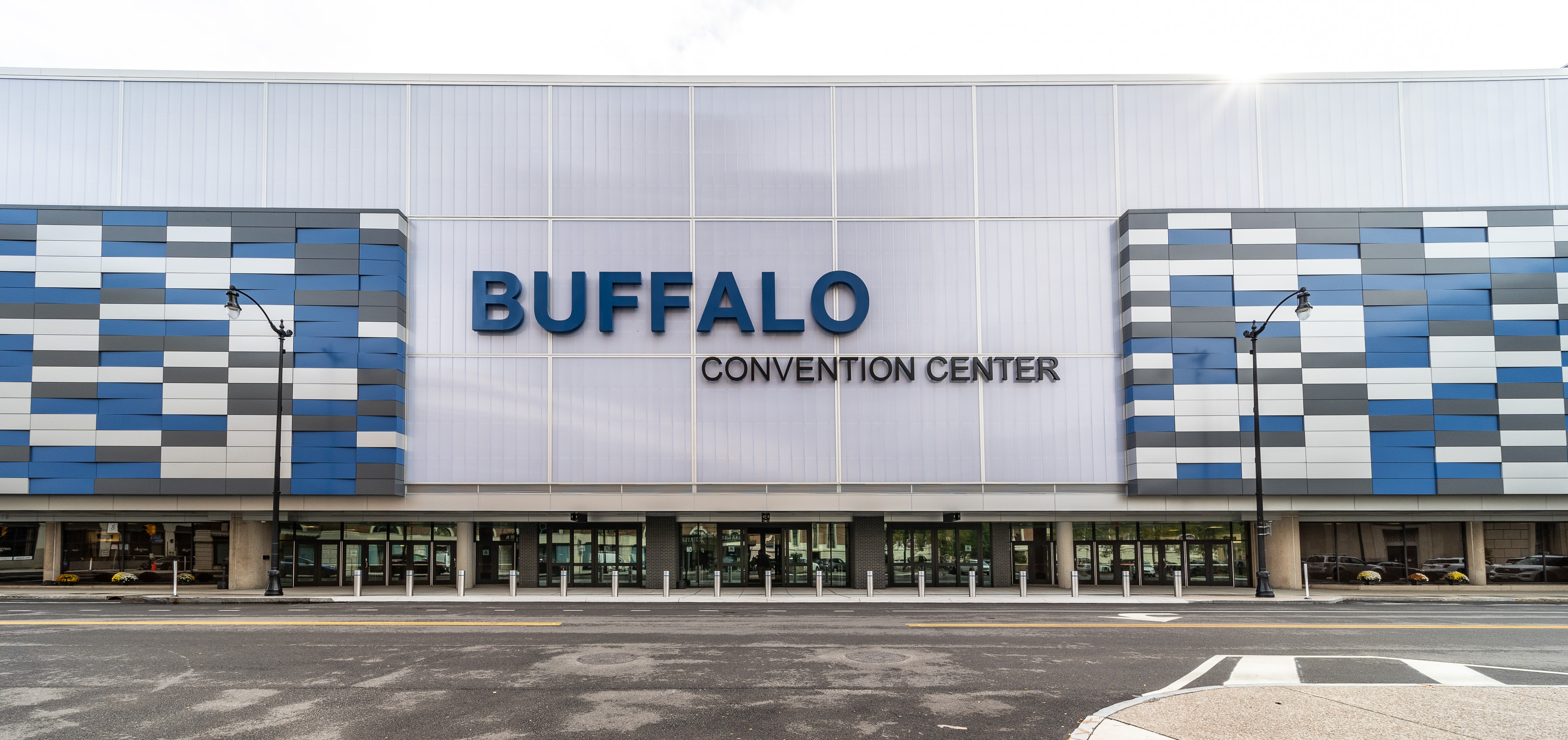
- Facade after 2023 renovations
- Interactive map of Buffalo Convention Center
- Address: 153 Franklin St, Buffalo, NY 14202
- Location: Downtown Buffalo, NY
- Coordinates: 42°53′13.2″N 78°52′33.1″W
- Public transit: Metro Rail at Lafayette Square station and Fountain Plaza station

Construction
- Opened: 1978
- Renovated: 2010, 2021-2023
- Expanded: 2010
- Cost: $7 million (2010 renovation)

Website
- buffaloconvention.com

The Buffalo Convention Center (formerly Buffalo Niagara Convention Center) is a convention center in downtown Buffalo, New York. Opened in 1978 at 64,410 square feet, the convention center underwent an expansion in 2010. The center holds events such as job fairs, food events, comic cons, and the World's Largest Disco.

In 2019, following a 90-day period taking input from the public, Erie County officials began exploring the potential replacement or further expansion of the convention center. According to the study, the majority of residents polled (86 percent) are in favor of investing in a new facility. The Buffalo Niagara Convention Center has been seen as "outdated" and smaller than convention centers in cities similar to Buffalo.

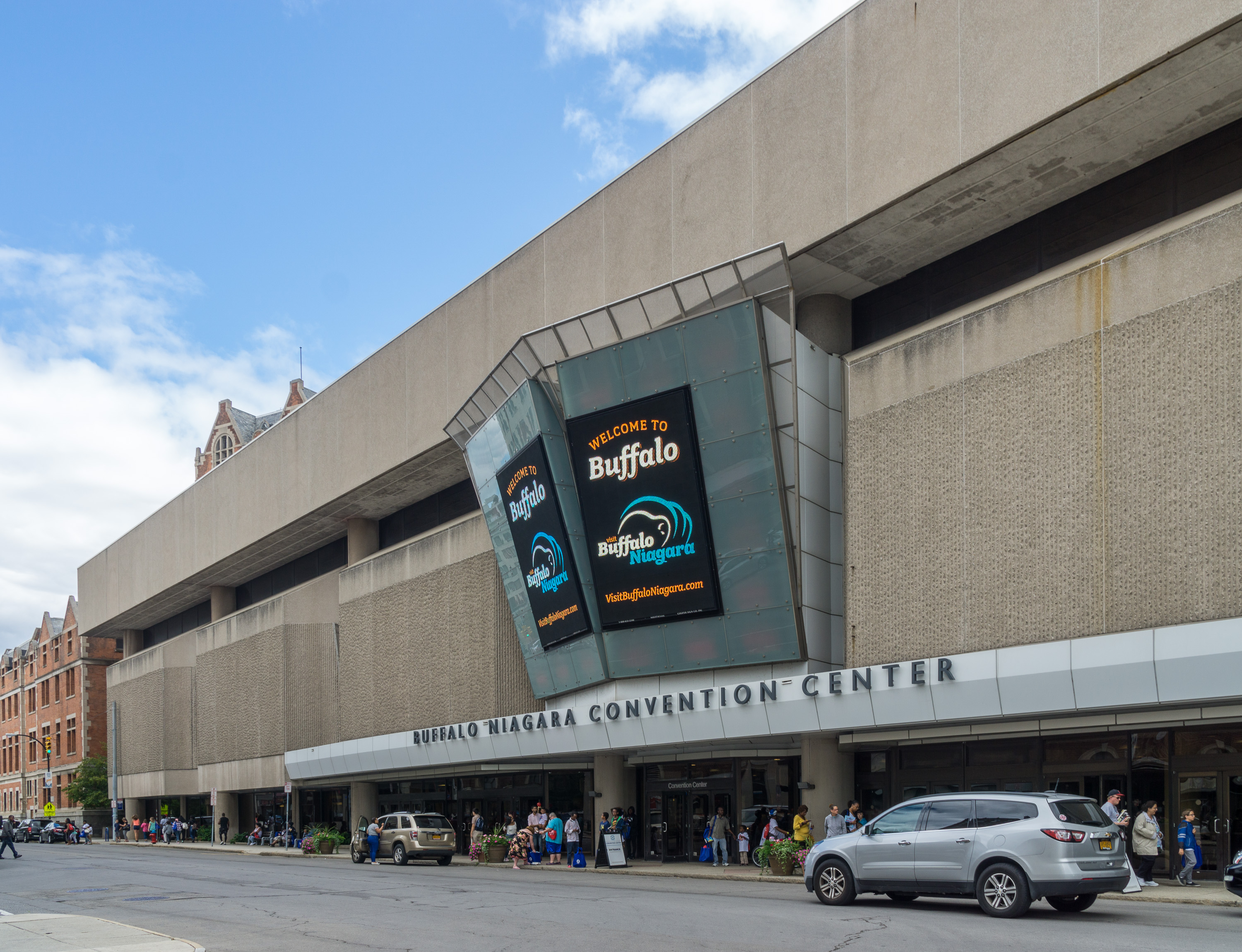
The Buffalo Convention Center facade in 2019, before renovations

== 2023 renovation and rebranding ==
The Convention Center received an extensive renovation from 2021 to 2023. The name was changed from "Buffalo Niagara Convention Center" to "Buffalo Convention Center" with new, larger lettering on the facade. Other updates included a new sidewalk layout with heated sidewalks, and new lighting panels which can be changed to show different colors for different events. The venue also implemented a reconfigured door entry, improved wayfinding signage, and higher ceilings.
