= Special Events station =

Former limited-service light rail station in Buffalo, New York

Special Events
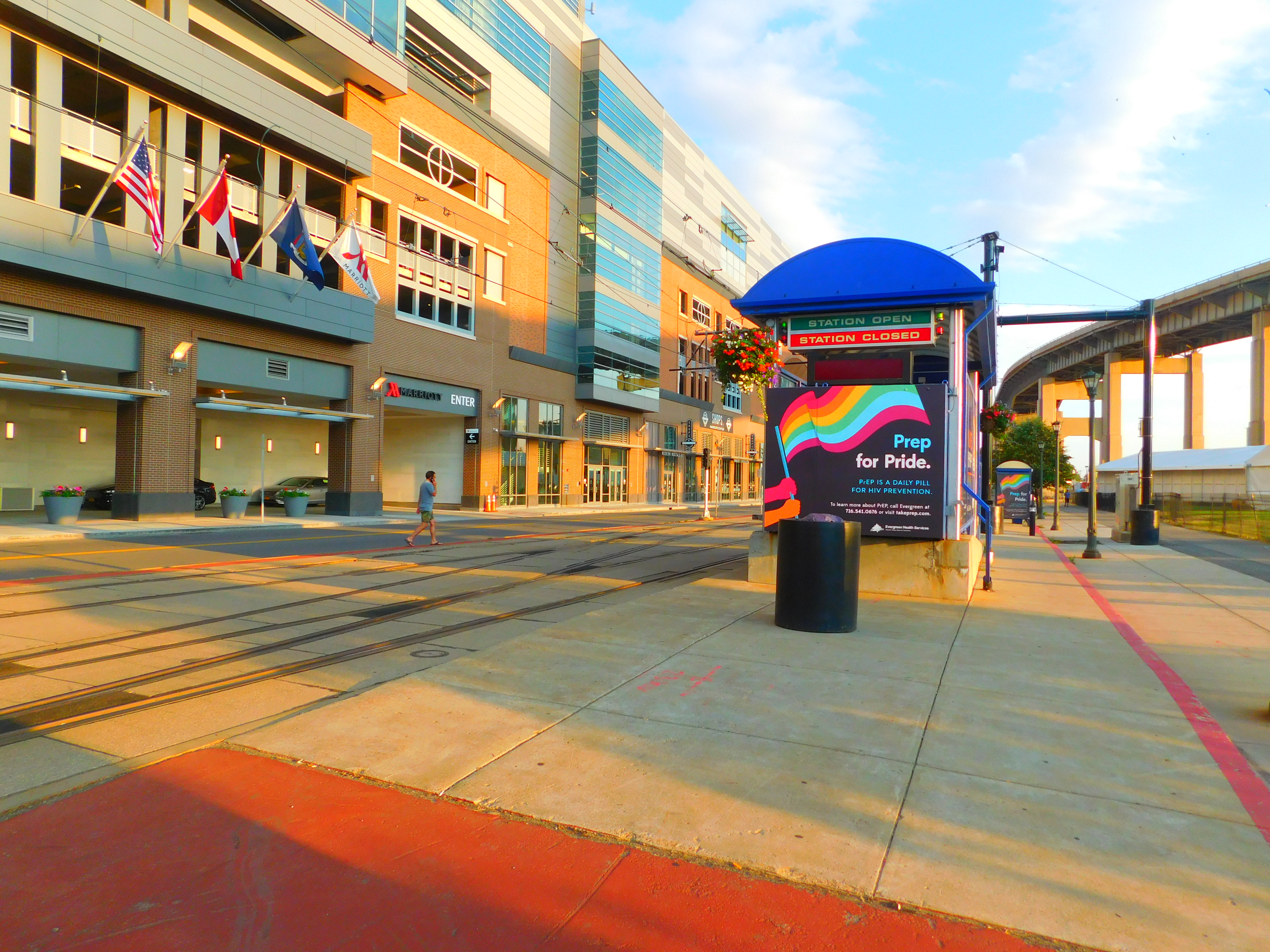
- Special Events station with LECOM Harborcenter in the background

General information
- Location: Main and Perry Streets; Buffalo, New York
- Coordinates: 42°52′35.98″N 78°52′38.68″W
- Owner: NFTA
- Platforms: 1 low-level side platform
- Tracks: 2

Construction
- Structure type: At-grade
- Accessible: Yes

Other information
- Fare zone: Free fare

History
- Opened: 1985
- Closed: 2020
- Former names: Arena

Former services
Preceding station	NFTA	Following station
Erie Canal Harbor toward University	Metro Rail Limited service	Terminus
Location

External image
- Train at the station at night. The Buffalo Skyway is seen in the background.

Special Events station (formerly Arena station) was the southernmost station in the Buffalo Metro Rail system located at the corner of Main and Perry Streets in the Free Fare Zone, which allows passengers free travel between this station and Fountain Plaza station. Passengers continuing northbound past Fountain Plaza station were required to have proof-of-payment. Special Events station was located next to the KeyBank Center, which it served immediately before and after an event. If there was no event at KeyBank Center, Erie Canal Harbor station served as the southern terminus. The tracks continue to the NFTA Rail Maintenance Yard.

Special Events station was replaced by the full-service DL&W station. The station last saw service in 2020 at the start of the COVID-19 pandemic, with the station being demolished in 2024. Service to DL&W station began on December 8, 2025.

== Notable places nearby ==
- KeyBank Center (formerly First Niagara Center, HSBC Arena, Marine Midland Arena and Crossroads Arena)
- Buffalo and Erie County Naval & Military Park
- LECOM Harborcenter
- NFTA Rail Maintenance Yard

== See also ==
- List of Buffalo Metro Rail stations
