= Canalside station =

Light rail station in Buffalo, New York

Canalside
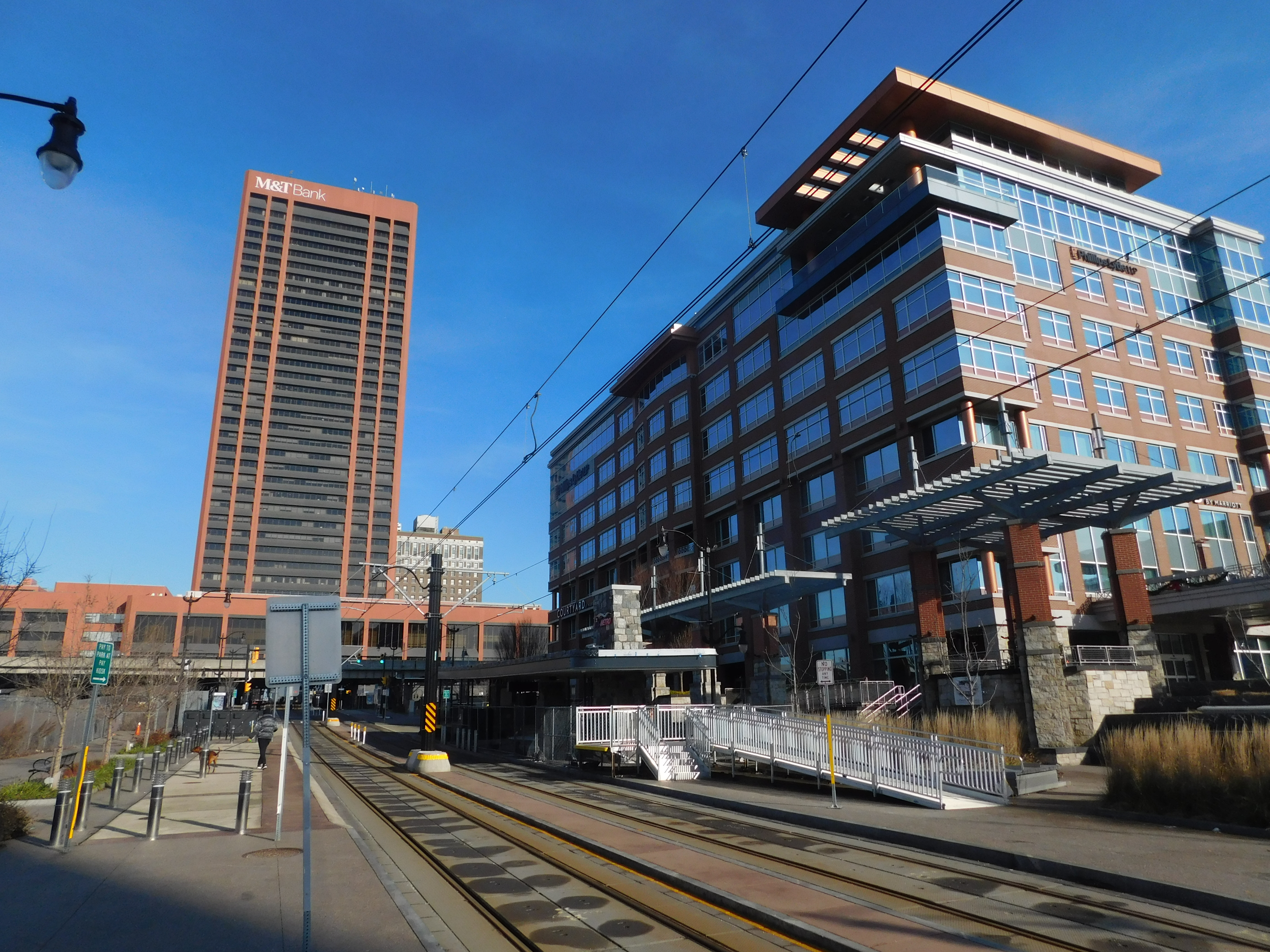
- Erie Canal Harbor (now Canalside) station platforms with Seneca One Tower in the background, during reconstruction in December 2023.

General information
- Location: 100 Main Street; Buffalo, New York
- Coordinates: 42°52′40″N 78°52′37″W
- Owner: NFTA
- Platforms: 2 low-level side platforms
- Tracks: 2
- Connections: Empire Service, Maple Leaf (at Buffalo–Exchange Street)

Construction
- Structure type: At-grade
- Accessible: yes

Other information
- Fare zone: Free fare

History
- Opened: October 9, 1984; 41 years ago
- Rebuilt: 2024
- Former names: Auditorium (1984–2003); Erie Canal Harbor (2003–2024)

Passengers
- 2017: 253,164

Services
Preceding station	NFTA	Following station
Seneca toward University	Metro Rail	DL&W Terminus
Former services
Preceding station	NFTA	Following station
Seneca toward University	Metro Rail Limited service	Special Events Terminus
Location

Canalside station (formerly Auditorium station and Erie Canal Harbor station) is a Buffalo Metro Rail station located in the 100 block of Main Street (just north of Hanover and Scott Streets) next to the South Aud Block of Canalside in the Free Fare Zone, which allows passengers free travel between this station and Fountain Plaza station. Passengers continuing past Fountain Plaza station are required to provide proof-of-payment. Prior to December 8, 2025, unless there were events occurring at KeyBank Center, in which case Special Events station was utilized, this was the southern terminus of Metro Rail. As of December 8, 2025; DL&W station is now the southern terminus of Metro Rail. Since Canalside station served as a terminal, immediately north of it is a double crossover. Canalside station is located close to Amtrak's Buffalo–Exchange Street station and the two stations are connected by a lit pathway beneath Interstate 190 with decorative cement and signage.

The station was originally known as Auditorium station when it first opened until September 1, 2003, when it was renamed Erie Canal Harbor station. The station was temporarily closed for construction and rebuilt to modern standards throughout 2023 and 2024, being renamed to Canalside station upon its reopening on July 2, 2024.

== Bus routes ==
- 6 Sycamore
- 8 Main (outbound)
- 24 Genesee (outbound)
- 68 George Urban (outbound)

== Notable places nearby ==
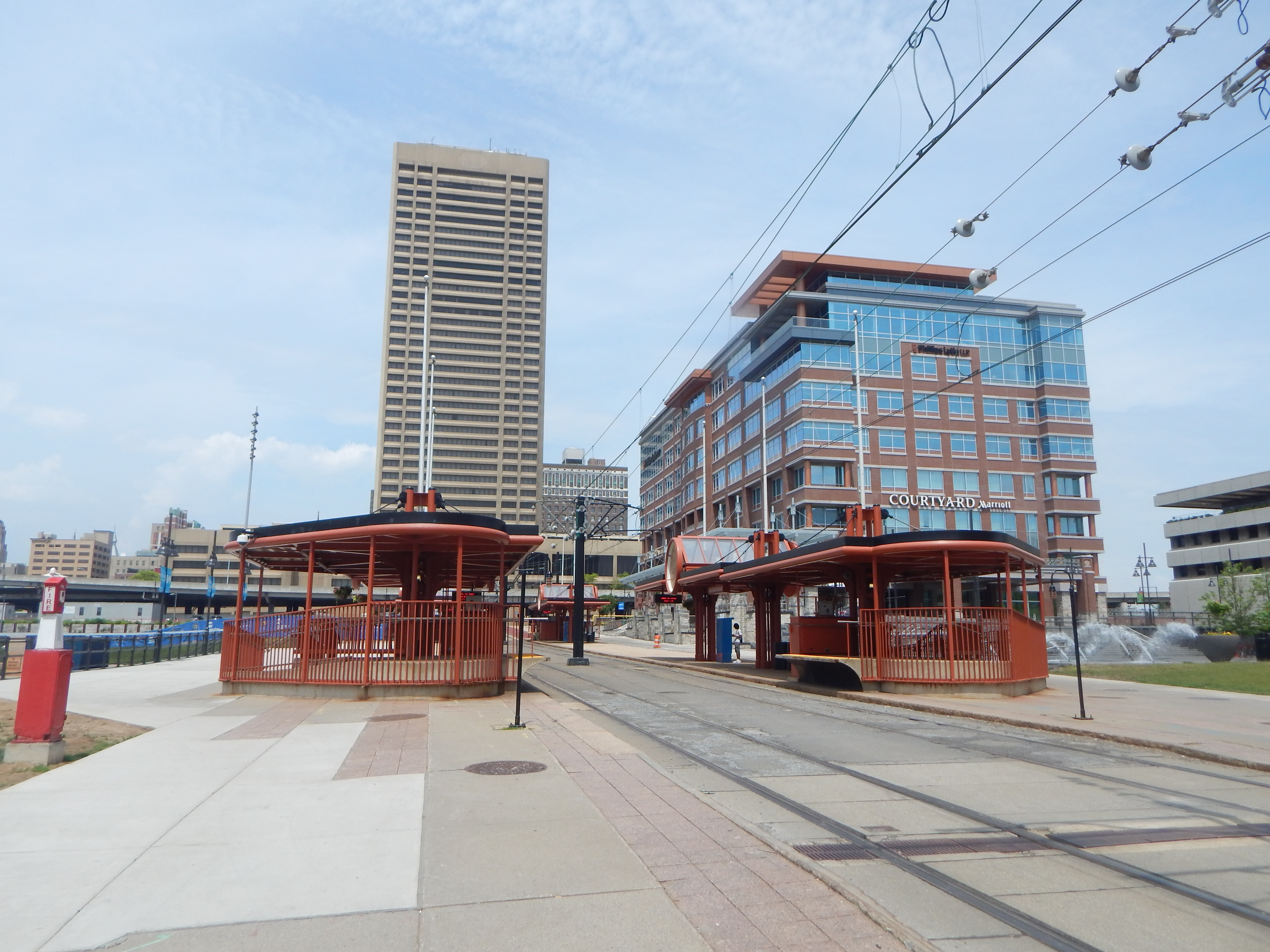
Erie Canal Harbor station (now Canalside station) in June 2015, with the former station shelters

Canalside station is located near:

- Buffalo–Exchange Street station (Amtrak train station)
- Buffalo and Erie County Naval & Military Park
- Canalside District
- KeyBank Center (formerly First Niagara Center, HSBC Arena, Marine Midland Arena and Crossroads Arena)
- LECOM Harborcenter

== See also ==
- List of Buffalo Metro Rail stations
