= List of routes of City of Buffalo streetcars =

Buffalo Street Car and Bus Guide Oct 1935

The list of routes of City of Buffalo streetcars lists all lines of historic Buffalo street car systems. Streetcars in Buffalo have declined in recent decades and been replaced by the car, and to a lesser extent, light rail.

== 1800s (the debut of streetcar service and its lines) ==
Car line	Terminals	Began service Horse	Began service Electric
Abbott Road		--	1915
Albany/School			
Bailey		--	1916
Best	Main & South Division; NYC Belt Line (Walden Ave)	--	1897
Broadway	Docks; Emslie	1885	1893
Cazenovia	Triangle; Cazenovia & Seneca	--	1893
Chicago		--	1908
Clinton		1885	1888
Connecticut		--	1881
Elk		--	1891
Elmwood	Elmwood & Allen; Elmwood & Forest	1889	
East Ferry		--	1895
Fillmore		--	1907
Forest		1888	
Hertel		--	1894
Genesee		1861	
Grant		--	1893
Herman			
Hoyt		1879	1881
Jefferson		1873	1894
Kenmore (Parkside)		--	1898
Kensington		--	1895
Main	Docks; City Line	1860	1890
Michigan		1880	1912
Niagara		1860	1891
Seneca		--	1891
South Park	Triangle; Limestone Hill	--	1894
Sycamore		--	1892
Tonawanda Street		--	1892
East Utica		--	1900
West Utica		--	1899
Washington		--	1892
William	Eagle & Main; Stockyards (Babcock)	1874	

== 1898 (pre-IRC) ==
Route name	Roads travelled
Albany/School	from foot of Main, Court, Niagara, Connecticut, Fourteenth, Albany, School to Niagara.
Bailey	Elk & Seneca, Bailey, South Park Av to Limestone Hill.
Baynes & Hoyt	Main & Exchange, Main, Allen, Wadsworth, Fourteenth, Rhode Island, Chenango, Baynes to Forest.
Broadway	Main & Exchange, Main, Clinton, Washington, Broadway to City Line.
Clinton/Eagle	Main & North Division, Eagle, Emslie, Clinton to City Line.
Elk Street	Main & Exchange, Perry, Michigan, Elk to Seneca.
Elmwood Avenue	Main & Exchange, Main, Virginia, Elmwood, Forest to the Park (Delaware Park)
Ferry Street	Main & Ferry, Bailey, Delavan to City Line.
Forest Avenue	Niagara & Forest, Forest, the Park, Delaware, Delavan, Linwood, Balcom, Harvard Place to Main.
Genesee Street	Washington & Exchange, Washington, Genesee to City Line.
Hertel Avenue	Main & Hertel, Hertel to Elmwood (McPherson)
Jefferson Street	Main & Exchange, Exchange, Louisiana, Seneca, Seneca, Cedar, Swan, Jefferson to Main.
Kensington Avenue	Washington & Exchange, Washington, Genesee, Kehr, Ferry, Grider, Kensington, Bailey, to City Line.
Main Street	Foot of Main Street, Main to City Line.
Michigan Avenue	Main & Exchange, Exchange, Michigan, to Main.
Niagara Street	Main & Exchange, Main, Niagara, Hertel, Tonawanda Street to City Line.
Seneca Street	Main & Seneca, Seneca to City Line and Cazenovia Park.
Sycamore Street	Washington & Exchange, Washington, Huron, Sycamore, Walden to City Line.
West Avenue	Main & Exchange, Main, Niagara, Carolina, West, York, Plymouth, Hampshire, Grant, Military Road, to NYC Belt Line.
William Street	Main & N Division, Main, Eagle, Michigan, William to City Line.

== 1904 (Post-Pan American Expo) ==
The Pan-American Exposition was held from May 1 through November 2, 1901.

Route name	Roads travelled	Base service	Night service?
Best	Main & S Division, S Division, Ellicott, Tupper, Elm, Best, Walden, to NYCRR.	10 min	no
Broadway	Cleveland & Buffalo Dock, Washington, Broadway to City Line.	7.5 min	yes
Cazenovia	Triangle (Abbott & South Park), Abbott, Cazenovia to Seneca.	20 min	no
Chicago see Sycamore/Chicago			
Clinton	Main & Clinton, Main, Eagle, Clinton to City Line. RETURN trips Clinton, Emslie, Eagle, Michigan, N Division, Main to Clinton.	7.5 min	no
Connecticut Belt Line	Main & Niagara, Niagara, Connecticut, Plymouth, Allen, Main to Niagara. Cars operate both ways.	10 min	no
East Ferry	Erie Depot, Exchange, Main, E Ferry, Bailey, Delavan, to City Line.	9 min to Belt Line; 18 min to City Line	no
East Utica	Foot of Main St, Main, East Utica, Fillmore, French, Kehr, East Ferry to Genesee.	18 min	no
Elmwood	Hertel & Elmwood, Elmwood, Allen, Main, Seneca, Michigan, Exchange to Main.	6 min	yes
Elk/South Park	Washington & South Division, Washington, Perry, Elk, Abbott, Triangle, South Park to Limestone Hill	7 min	yes
Forest Belt	Main & Niagara, Niagara, Forest, Delaware, Delavan, Harvard, Balcom, Main to Niagara. Cars operate both ways.	9 min	
Genesee	Pine Hill Loop, Genesee, Main, Perry, Washington, Genesee to Pine Hill.	6 min	yes
Grant	Main & Niagara, Niagara, Carolina, West, York, Plymouth, Hampshire, Grant, Military Road to City Line.	7.5 min to Grant/Military; 15 min to City Line.	no
Herman	Main & S Division, S Division, Spring, William, Mortimer, Peckham, Smith, Herman to Best. RETURN trips via Herman, Smith, Peckham, Mortimer, William, Spring, Swan, to Main.	14 min	no
Hertel	Main & Hertel, Hertel to Tonawanda.	20 min	no
Hoyt	Michigan & Exchange, Exchange, Main, Allen, Wadsworth, Fourteenth, Rhode Island, Chenango, Baynes, Forest, Hoyt, Hampshirt, Winter, Brayton, Seventeenth, Connecticut, Normal, Jersey, Plymouth, Hudson, Virginia, Main, Seneca, Michigan to Exchange.	6	yes
Jefferson	Main & Jefferson, Jefferson, Swan, Bailey, Triangle, South Park to Limestone Hill. Trips after 8:30 pm operate only to Emslie & Swan. After 8:30, use Elk/South Park cars between Emslie & Limestone Hill.	8 Min	yes
Kensington	Erie Depot, Exchange, Main, E Ferry, Grider, Kensington to Bailey	18 min	no
Main	Docks, Main St to City Line.	3 min	yes
Michigan	Main & South Division, S Division, Washington, Seneca, Ellicott, Exchange, Michigan, E Ferry to Main. RETURN E Ferry, Masten, North St., Michigan, Exchange to Main.	10 min	no
Niagara	Main & Niagara, Niagara, Hertel, Tonawanda, to City Line.	4 min	yes
Seneca	Washington & Seneca, Seneca, City Line, Seneca, Main, S Division, Washington to Seneca.	7 min	yes
Sycamore/Chicago	Walden & Hoerner, Walden, Sycamore, Huron, Washington, S Division, Chestnut, Swan, Chicago, Perry, Hamburg to Erie RR.	10 min	yes (Hoerner to Exchange)
Utica Belt Line	Main & Niagara, Niagara, Ferry, Chenango, Utica, Main to Niagara. Cars operate both ways.	9 min	no
William	Main & Eagle, Eagle, Michigan, William, City Line, William, Michigan, N Division, Main to Eagle.	6 min	yes
Zoo (Parkside)	Terrace & Main, Main, Florence, Parkside to Belt Line.	15	no

== 1916 (post WW I) ==
After the amalgamation of a number of streetcar companies during the early start of the 20th century, the International Railway Company began assignment of route numbers to virtually all of its routes it operated. Some truncated versions (such as "Abt" for Abbott Road, and "Bst" for Best Street) remained, but were slowly assigned numbers, similar to the current route numbers used in today's NFTA Metro routes.

Route name	Route travelled	Base service	Night service?
Abt - Abbott	Abbott & Woodside, Abbott, Bailey, Seneca, Swan to Erie, returning Erie, S. Division, Chestnut, Swan, Seneca, Bailey, Abbott to Woodside.	10 min	service stops 1:00 am
Bst - Best Street	Erie & Pearl, Erie, S Division, Ellicott, Tupper, Elm, Best, Walden to Lathrop, returning Walden, Best, Elm, Swan to Erie.	10 min.	service stops 12:15 am
4-Broadway	South Division & Ellicott, Ellicott, N Division, Washington, Broadway, City Line, Broadway, Washington to S Division.	5 min	yes
2-Clinton	Erie & Pearl, Erie, S Division, Ellicott, Eagle, Michigan, Clinton, City Line, Clinton, Emslie, Eagle, Michigan, N Division, Washington, Swan to Erie.	8 min	yes
Con-Connecticut	Niagara & Connecticut, Connecticut, Normal, Jersey, Plymouth, Cottage, Days Park, Allen, Main, Virginia, Elmwood, Allen, Wadsworth, Fourteenth, Normal, Connecticut to Niagara.		service stops 12:00mid
12-East Utica	Ferry & Genesee, Ferry, Kehr, French, Fillmore, Utica, Main, Seneca, Michigan, Exchange, Main, Utica, Fillmore, French, Kehr, Ferry to Genesee.	6.5 min 5:30–8:25 am 2:05–7:30 pm	yes
E-Elmwood	Exchange & Michigan, Exchange, Ellicott, Seneca, Franklin, Chippewa, Elmwood to Hertel, returning Elmwood, Chippewa, Franklin, Seneca, Michigan, to Erie and NYC depots.	4 min	yes
11-East Ferry/Elk	Delavan & Preston, Delavan, Bailey, Ferry, Main, Perry, Michigan, Elk to Seneca, returning same route.	6 min a.m. rush hours 10 min mid-day 5 min p.m. rush hours.	service stops 1:00 am
13-Kensington	Bailey & City Line, Bailey, Kensington, Grider, Ferry, Main, Seneca, Pearl, Terrace, Main, Ferry, Grider, Kensington, Bailey to City Line.	6 min a.m. rush hours 10 min mid-day 5 min p.m. rush hours.	service stops 2:08 am
G-Genesee	Perry & Main, Perry, Washington, Genesee to Pine Hill, returning, Genesee, Main to Perry.	8 min	yes
3-Grant	Shelton Square, Niagara, Franklin, Chippewa, Elmwood, Tracy, West, York, Plymouth, Hampshire, Grant, Military Road, Skillen, Vulcan, returning, Vulcan, Skillen, Military, Grant, Hampshire, Plymouth, York, West, Tracy, Elmwood, Chippewa, Pearl, Erie to Shelton Square.	6 min	yes
7-Hoyt/Seneca	Forest & Hoyt, Hoyt, Ferry, Hampshire, Winter, Brayton, Vermont, 17th, Connecticut, Normal, Jersey, Cottage, Virginia, Elmwood, Chippewa, Franklin, Seneca to City Line, returning, Seneca, Franklin, Chippewa, Elmwood, Allen, Wadsworth, Fourteenth, Rhode Island, Chenango, Baynes to Forest.	5.5 min	yes
Jef-Jefferson	Main & Jefferson, Jefferson, Swan to Emslie, returning Swan, Jefferson to Main. During rush-periods, cars continue from Swan and Emslie to Smith, to Abbott Road.	7.5 min Main to Emslie; 10 min rush hours	yes
8-Main	Ohio & Main, Main to City Line, returning same route.	4 min	yes
5-Niagara	Shelton Square, Niagara, Hertel, Tonawanda, Grace, Niagara, Vulcan, River Road to Grand Island Ferry, returning River Road, Vulcan, Niagara, Grace, Tonawanda, Hertel, Niagara, Pearl, Erie to Shelton Square.	8 min to City Line; 4 min to Grace.	yes
6-Sycamore	Swan & Washington, Washington, Huron, Sycamore, Walden to City Line, returning Walden, Sycamore, Huron, Washington, S Division, Ellicott to Swan.	8 min	yes
10-West Utica/South Park	Limestone Hill, South Park, Triangle, Abbott Road, Elk, Michigan, Perry, Main, W Utica, Chenango, Ferry to Niagara, returning Ferry, Hampshire, Winter, Massachusetts, Brayton, Utica, Main, Perry, Michigan, Elk, Abbott Road, Triangle, South Park to Limestone Hill.	8 min	no
1-William	Erie & Pearl, Erie, S Division, Ellicott, Eagle, Michigan, William to City Line, returning William, Michigan, North Division, Washington, Swan to Erie.	6.5 min	no
9-Zoo/Kenmore	Main & Seneca, Main, Florence, Parkside, Hertel, Virgil, Kenmore to Delaware Av, returning Kenmore, Virgil, Hertel, Parkside, Florence, Main, Seneca, Michigan, Exchange to Main.	10 min	service stops 12:30 am

== 1935 (late-depression years) ==
Shortly after 1935, major changes were becoming evident, with elimination of streetcar service on virtually all west-side lines, including (from west to east) 5-Niagara, 3-Grant, 7-Hoyt and 20-Elmwood streetcars, and (from north to south) 10-West Utica, and 22-Connecticut streetcars.

Post-1940, the only streetcar that crossed Main Street, continuing westbound, was the 23-Fillmore/Hertel car operating between South Park Avenue in South Buffalo and Tonawanda Street using a loop over Tonawanda, Grace, Niagara and Hertel.

Route name	Route travelled	Destination Signs	Night service?
1-William	From North Division & Ellicott, on Ellicott, Eagle, Michigan, William to the City Line. Returning, on William, Michigan, North Division to Ellicott.	William (both directions)	yes
2-Clinton	From North Division & Ellicott, on Ellicott, Michigan, Clinton to City Line. Returning, on Clinton, Emslie, Eagle, Michigan, North Division to Ellicott.	Clinton (both directions)	yes
3-Grant	From Shelton Square, on Niagara, Franklin, Chippawa, Elmwood, Tracy, West Ave, York, Plymouth, Hampshire, Grant, Military Road, Skillen to Vulcan. Returning Skillen, Military Road, Grant, Hampshire, Normal, Jersey, Plymouth, Hudson, West Ave, Tracy, Elmwood, Chippawa, Pearl, Erie to Shelton Square.	Skillen or Hertel (outbound); Shelton Square (inbound)	yes Hertel-Shelton Square only
4-Broadway	From North Division and Washington, on Washington, Broadway to City Line. Returning, on Broadway, Washington, South Division, Ellicott, North Division to Washington.	Broadway (both directions)	yes
5-Niagara	From Shelton Square, on Niagara, Hertel, Tonawanda, Vulcan to River Road. Returning, on Vulcan, Tonawanda, Grace, Niagara, Pearl, Erie to Shelton Square.	Riverside or Grace (outbound); Shelton Square (inbound)	yes
6-Sycamore	From North Division and Washington, on Washington, Huron, Sycamore, Walden to City Line. Returning on Walden, Sycamore, Huron, Washington, South Division, Ellicott, North Division to Washington.	Sycamore (both directions)	yes
7-Hoyt	From Terrace and Franklin, on Franklin, Chippawa, Elmwood, Allen, Wadsworth, 14th, Rhode Island, Chenango, Baynes, Forest to Hoyt, returning on Hoyt, Ferry, Hampshire, Winter, 17th, Jersey, York, Plymouth, Cottage, Elmwood, Chippawa, Franklin, Seneca, Pearl, to Terrace.	Terrace (inbound); Hoyt (outbound)	no
8-Main	From D, L & W Depot, on Ohio, Illinois, Perry, Main to City Line, returning on Main to D, L & W Depot.	City Line (outbound); DL&W Depot (inbound)	yes
9-Kenmore (Zoo)	From DL&W depot, on Ohio, Illinois, Perry, Main, Florence, Parkside, Hertel, Virgil to Virgil loop at Kenmore Avenue. Returning, Virgil, Hertel, Parkside, Florence, Main to DL&W depot.	Kenmore (outbound); DL&W Depot (inbound)	no
10-West Utica; Sundays, see route 11	From Court & Main, on Main, West Utica, Chenango, Ferry to Niagara, returning Ferry, Hampshire, Winter, Brayton, Utica, Main, Huron, Pearl, Court to Main.	West Utica (outbound); Court Street (inbound)	no
11-East & West Utica; Weekdays, see route 10, 12	From Ferry and Niagara, on Ferry, Hampshire, Winter, Brayton, West Utica, East Utica, Fillmore, French, Kehr, East Ferry to Bailey (Wende Loop), returning East Ferry, Kehr, French, Fillmore, East Utica, West Utica, Chenango, Ferry to Niagara.	West Utica (westbound); East Utica (eastbound)	no
12-East Utica; Sundays, see route 11	From Terrace and Main, on Main, East Utica, Fillmore, French, Kehr, East Ferry to Bailey (Wende Loop), returning East Ferry, Kehr, French, Fillmore, East Utica, Main, Seneca, Pearl, Terrace to Main.	East Utica (outbound); Terrace (inbound)	no
13-Kensington	From Shelton Square, on Main, East Ferry, Grider, Kensington, Bailey to Rounds, returning Bailey, Kensington, Grider, East Ferry, Main, Huron, Pearl, Niagara to Main.	Shelton Square (inbound); Kensington (outbound)	yes
14-Abbott Road	From Swan and Washington, on Washington, Seneca, Smith, Abbott Road to Woodside, returning Abbott, Smith, Seneca, Ellicott, Swan to Washington.	Abbott Road (both directions)	no
15-Seneca	From Swan and Washington, on Washington, Seneca to City Line, returning Seneca, Ellicott, Swan to Washington.	Seneca (both directions)	yes
16-South Park	From Swan and Washington, on Washington, Perry, Michigan, Elk, Abbott Road, Triangle, South Park to Limestone Hill, returning South park, Triangle, Abbott Road, Elk, Michigan, Perry, Washington, Seneca, Ellicott, Swan to Washington.	South Park (both directions)	yes
18-Jefferson	From Main and Jefferson, on Jefferson, Swan to Larkin Loop, returning Swan, Jefferson, to Main and Jefferson loop.	Jefferson (both directions)	yes
19-Bailey	From Broadway Car House (Broadway & Greene) on Broadway, Bailey, Seneca to Seneca Yard, returning Seneca, Bailey, Broadway to Greene.	Bailey (both directions)	yes, with exception of 1.75-hour gap between cars between 2:15 and 4:00 am
20-Elmwood	From Michigan and Exchange, on Exchange, Ellicott, Seneca, Franklin, Chippewa, Elmwood to Hinman, returning Elmwood, Chippewa, Franklin, Seneca, Michigan to Exchange.	Exchange Depot (inbound); Hinman or Hertel (outbound)	yes
21-Michigan/Forest	From Michigan and Seneca, on Seneca, Ellicott, Eagle, Michigan, Ferry, Main, Harvard, Delavan, Delaware, Forest to Niagara, returning Forest, Delaware, Delavan, Linwood, Balcom, Main, Ferry, Michigan to Seneca.	Michigan (southbound); Forest (northbound)	no
22-Connecticut	From Niagara and Connecticut, on Connecticut, Normal, Jersey, Plymouth, Cottage, Days Park, Allen to Main. Returning, on Allen, Wadsworth, 14th, Connecticut to Niagara.	Connecticut (both directions)	no
23-Fillmore/Hertel	From Hertel and Tonawanda, on Hertel, Main, Fillmore, North Parade, East Parade, Genesee, Fillmore, Smith to Abbott Road. Returning, on Abbott Road, Elk, Smith, Fillmore, Genesee, East Parade, North Parade, Main, Hertel, Hertel, Tonawanda, Grace, Niagara, Hertel to Tonawanda.	Fillmore (southbound); Hertel (northbound)	yes
24-Genesee	From North Division and Washington, on Washington, Genesee to Pine Hill. Returning, Genesee, Washington, South Division, Ellicott, North Division to Washington.	Genesee/Pine Hill (outbound); Genesee (inbound)	yes

== Later half of the 1930s (the start of the decline of streetcars) ==
Shortly after 1935, the removal of streetcar lines became more evident after the introduction of new routes being operated with buses, instead of introducing new streetcar lines.

The first group of streetcar routes that reappeared as bus routes were the westside lines, easy to explain with the narrowness of the streets and their zigzagging over the courses of many streets. The routes that fell to bus service include:

- Connecticut Street (Route 22 was replaced with the 22-Porter/Best bus route, eliminating service on Connecticut altogether)
- Delavan Avenue (Became Route D, then Route 26)
- Elmwood Avenue (Route 20)
- Grant Street (Route 3)
- Hoyt Street (Route 7 was replaced with the 7-Baynes/Richmond bus route, removing service from Hoyt)
- Michigan/Forest (Route 21)
- Niagara Street (Route 5)
- West Utica Street (Route 10. Weekend service using route 11 was also eliminated, leaving 12-Utica streetcars to operate daily.)

In addition, elsewhere:

- Abbott Road (Route 14)
- Bailey Avenue (Route 19 merged with the Route B-Bailey bus route, creating a single service from the City Line in the north to South Park in the south section of Buffalo.)

== 1940s and 1950s (the last decade of streetcar service) ==
In 1941, four streetcar lines ended service.

- Monday, April 14, 1941 - routes 1-William and 18-Jefferson cease streetcar service.
- Late September, 1941 - routes 15-Seneca and 16-South Park cease streetcar service.

After these dates, World War II had set in, creating a six-year gap in the escalation of lost streetcar routes, due to the shortage of manpower to fix the newly implemented buses, and from the scarcity of precious metal that was being used in wartime production of supplies.

At this time, the International Railway Company encouraged the riding public to return to the use of streetcars and support them in their cooperation with the war cause.

In 1947 and 1948, removal of streetcar service began again.

- Thursday, February 6, 1947 - route 12-Utica ended service.
- Friday, February 20, 1948 - routes 2-Clinton and 6-Sycamore ended service.

In 1950, the final six streetcar routes ended service, replaced immediately by buses.

- Sunday, June 18, 1950 - all Cold Spring Depot streetcar service ceases (Rts. 8-Main, 9-Parkside/Zoo & 13-Kensington).
- Saturday, July 1, 1950 - all Broadway Depot streetcar service ceases (Rts. 4-Broadway, 23-Fillmore/Hertel and 24-Genesee).

After the end of passenger service, the Niagara Frontier Transit Corporation spent approximately six months removing the remaining 175 streetcars from the Cold Springs and Broadway streetcar barns over the remaining streetcar trackage on Broadway, Fillmore Avenue, Main Street and Hertel to the Military car barn where the outer bodies were removed and burned.

The streetcar tracks were usually covered up with asphalt, and occasionally during major road work, construction crews may dig up remains of tracks that have been buried under mere inches or feet for the past fifty years.

At the present time, Main Street (NY 5) is undergoing extensive reconstruction of the roadbed and in areas of roadway that were not dug up during the construction of the Metro Rail line (using tunnel boring instead), the tracks are being brought back to the surface and dismantled.

== Metro Rail (1985–present) ==
Though termed a "light rail subway", the Metro Rail is worthy of mention in that the portion operating in Downtown Buffalo from the Fountain Plaza to Erie Canal Harbor stations operates similar to a normally run streetcar service.

The route originates in Downtown Buffalo on Main Street at Erie Canal Harbor station (previously Auditorium), just north of Scott and Hanover Streets. The light rail line continues north, then north-east along Main Street, stopping at 5 above-ground stations in Downtown Buffalo, then eight underground stations (like a subway) until arriving at University station, located a brief distance northeast of Niagara Falls Boulevard.

== See also ==
- International Railway (New York–Ontario)
- Niagara Frontier Transportation Authority
