= Seneca One Tower =

Office skyscraper in Buffalo, New York

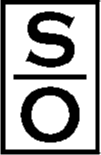

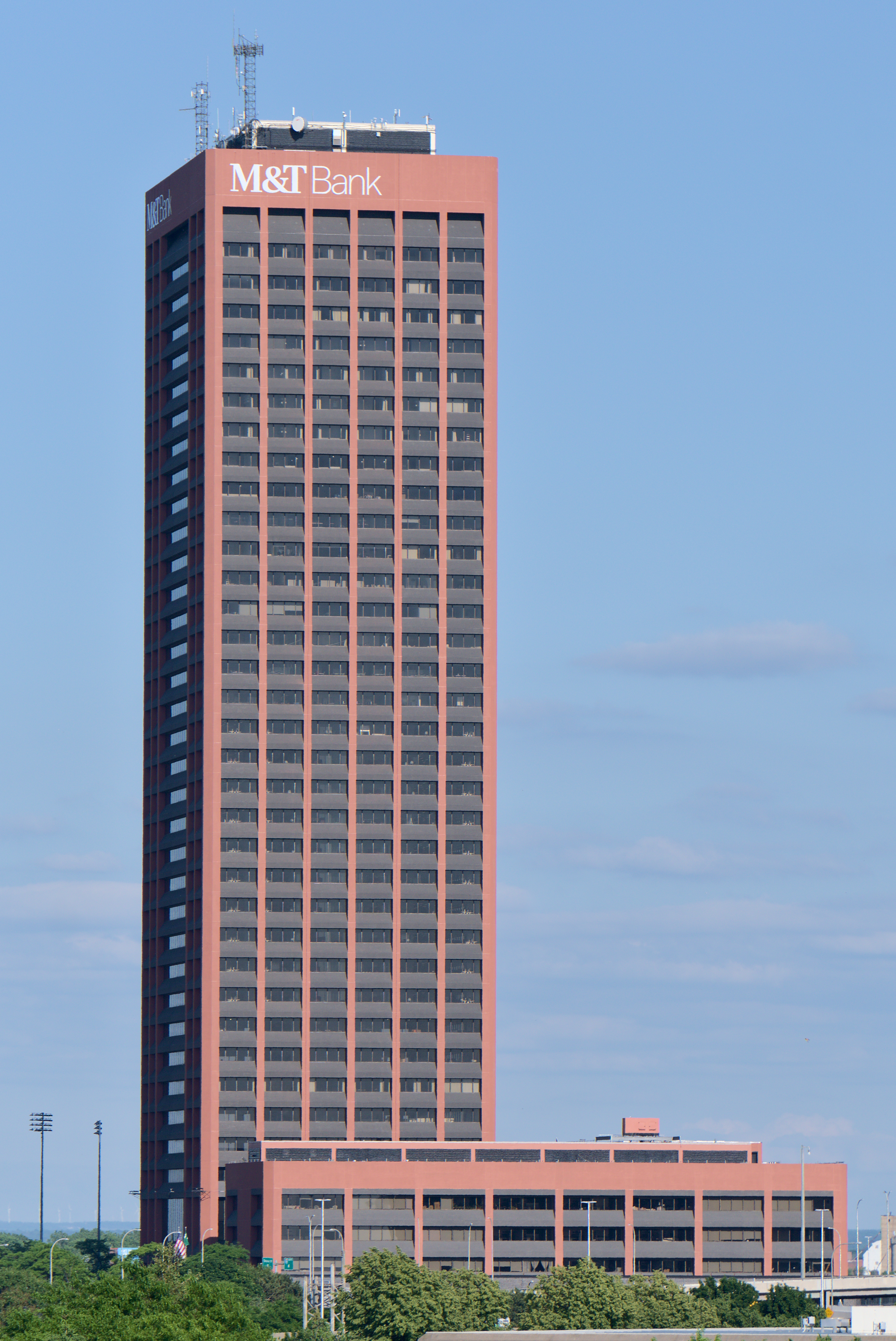
- Seneca One Tower in 2021
- Former names: One Seneca Tower, One HSBC Center, Marine Midland Center

Record height
- Tallest in Buffalo since 1970^{[I]}
- Preceded by: Buffalo City Hall

General information
- Status: Completed
- Type: Class "A" Office
- Location: Seneca One Tower, Buffalo, NY, United States
- Coordinates: 42.8795°N 78.8757°W
- Construction started: 1969
- Completed: 1972
- Cost: $50 million US$($439 million in 2025 dollars)
- Owner: Douglas Development Corporation, Washington, DC
- Operator: Ciminelli Real Estate Corporation

Height
- Roof: 529 ft (161 m)

Technical details
- Floor count: 40 (38 occupiable)
- Floor area: 1,200,000 sq ft (111,483.6 m^{2})
- Lifts/elevators: 27

Design and construction
- Architect: Skidmore, Owings & Merrill LLP
- Developer: Douglas Development Corporation, Washington, DC

Other information
- Parking: 808 spaces in attached Seneca Ramp and 465 spaces on 2 levels below the building

Website
- senecaonebuffalo.com

Seneca One Tower is a 529-foot (161 m) skyscraper located in downtown Buffalo, New York. The building was formerly known as One HSBC Center (1999–2013) and prior to that, as Marine Midland Center (1972–1999), with its name being changed in 1999, shortly after Marine Midland's parent company HSBC re-branded the bank as HSBC Bank USA. The building was constructed at a cost of $50 million between 1969 and 1974, and contains over 1,200,000 square feet (110,000 m^{2}) of space. Today, the 40 story building still dominates the Buffalo skyline. It is an example of modern architecture. The building's design is similar to that of the 33 South Sixth building in Minneapolis, which was designed by the same architectural firm.

In 2021, the entire tower and four mezzanine floors were finished being renovated as part of a $150 million renovation by Douglas Development, which included adding over 200 prime rate apartments.

== Building facts ==
- The building was designed by Skidmore Owings & Merrill (SOM) and completed in 1972, with the interiors completed in 1974. The lead architect was Marc Goldstein; John Merrill was partner-in-charge. The interiors were designed by Davis Allen and Margo Grant Walsh.
- The tower was the world headquarters of Marine Midland until 1998, and served as the headquarters of HSBC USA until 1999, when it moved its U. S. headquarters to New York City.
- Seneca One Tower is the tallest privately owned office building outside of New York City within New York state. The tallest publicly owned building outside of New York City is Erastus Corning Tower in Albany.
- The building's plaza hosts Ronald Bladen's 1973 work titled "Vroom, Shhh."
- The building spans the southern end of Main Street, along which the Buffalo Metro Rail passes beneath the building.
- The building was renovated by the Buffalo-based architecture firm, Antunovich Associates.
- M&T Bank Tech Hub, also designed by Antunovich Associates, moved into Seneca One in November 2020.

=== Broadcast towers atop the building ===
- WBXZ-LD (TV 56)
- W275BB (FM 102.9), relays WECK
- W227BW (FM 93.3), relays WZXV

== Current tenants ==
The following is a list of significant tenants as of 2026:

- M&T Bank
- Highmark Blue Cross Blue Shield
- 43 North
- Serendipity Labs
- Other Half Brewing
- Twipes
- Hounds & Hops
- Douglas Development Buffalo
- Lighthouse Technology Services

== Significant former tenants ==
- HSBC Bank USA
- Odoo
- Pegula Sports and Entertainment
- Consulate General of Canada in Buffalo
- Phillips Lytle

== History ==
On December 5, 2012, HSBC Bank USA announced that they would vacate the space it leased in the tower by the time their lease expires in October 2013. Paired with the departure of Phillips Lytle LLP, and the recent closing of the Canadian Consulate, the tower was 90 percent vacant as of 2014. In August 2016, it was announced that Washington, D.C.–based Douglas Development will buy One Seneca tower. On September 29, 2016, Buffalo Business First reported that Douglas Jemal of Washington, D.C. had completed the purchase of One Seneca Tower and an adjacent parking ramp with plans to redevelop the tower and plaza into a mixed-use complex including retail, restaurant, hotel, office and apartment components.

In June 2019, M&T Bank announced it would occupy 15 of the tower's floors as the bank's "technology hub." In 2020, the building gained a paint scheme of terra cotta and gunmetal. In early 2021 an illuminated M&T Bank sign was added to the top of the building, replacing a Buffalo Bills pennant (a promotional courtesy of the local Oxford Pennant Company) that was temporarily introduced for the team's 2020 season playoff run between the AFC Wild Card and AFC Championship rounds.

== Gallery ==
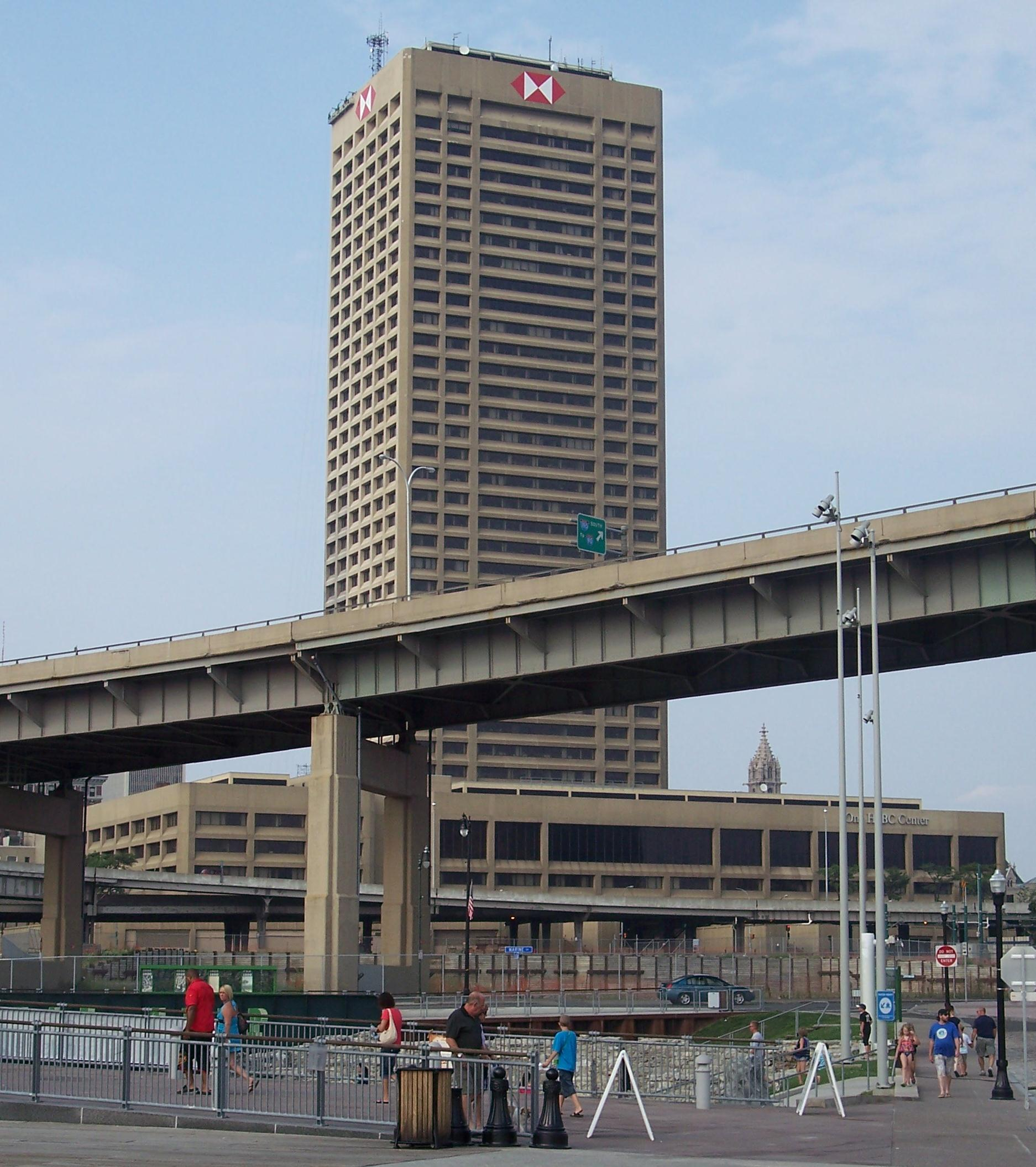
View from Canalside with previous HSBC branding and façade.

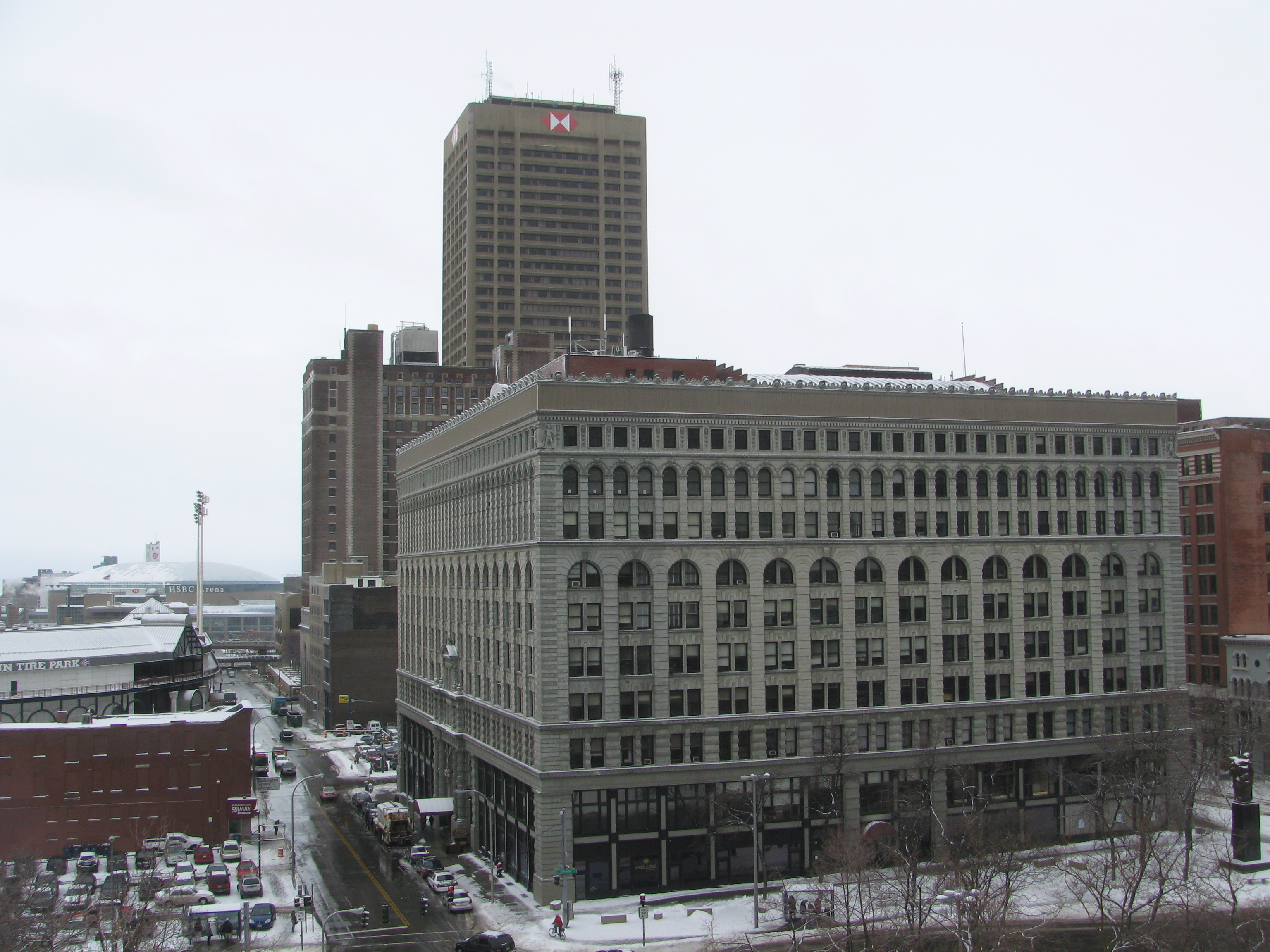
Seneca One Tower (then named One HSBC Center) behind Ellicott Square Building

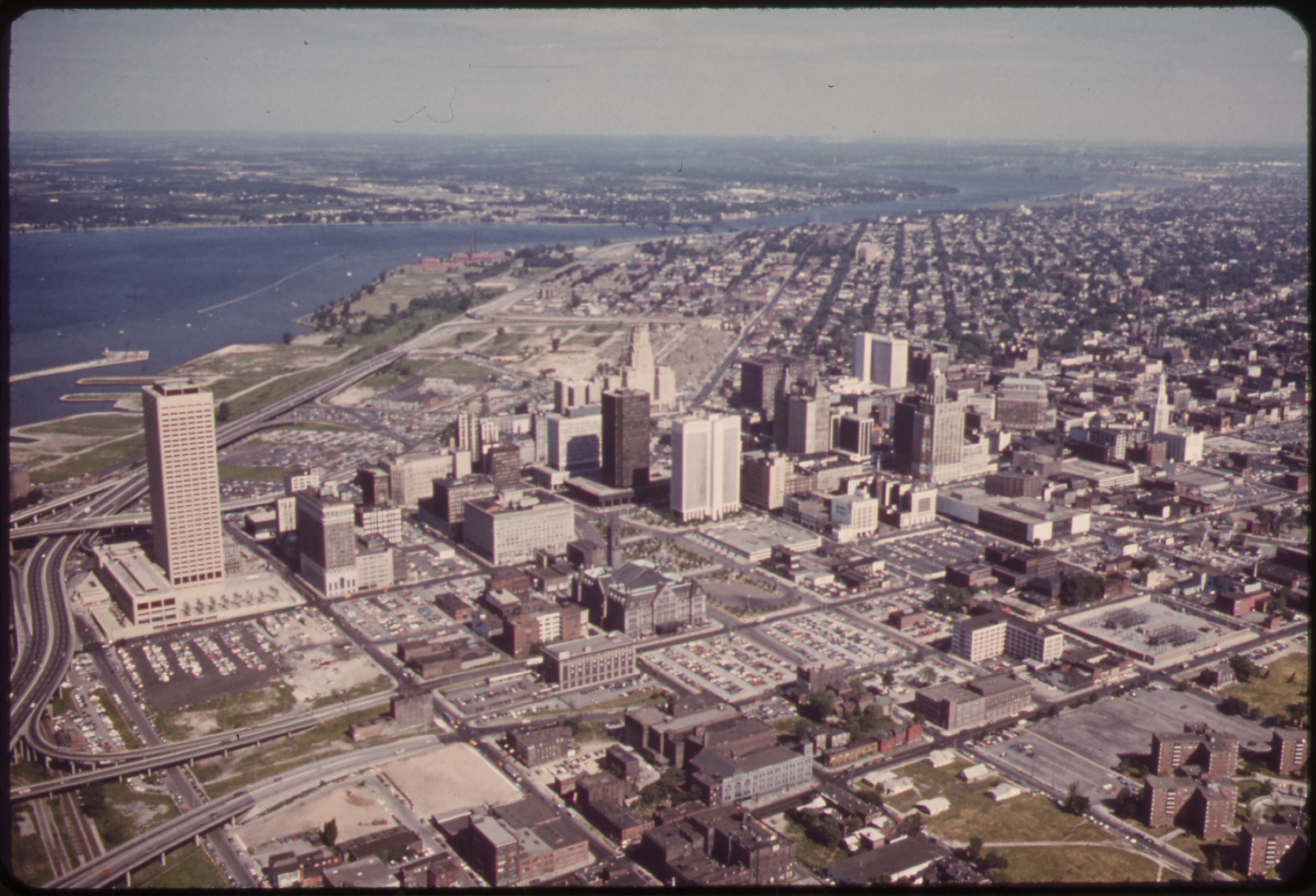
Downtown Buffalo in 1973, shortly after the skyscraper (on the left) was completed

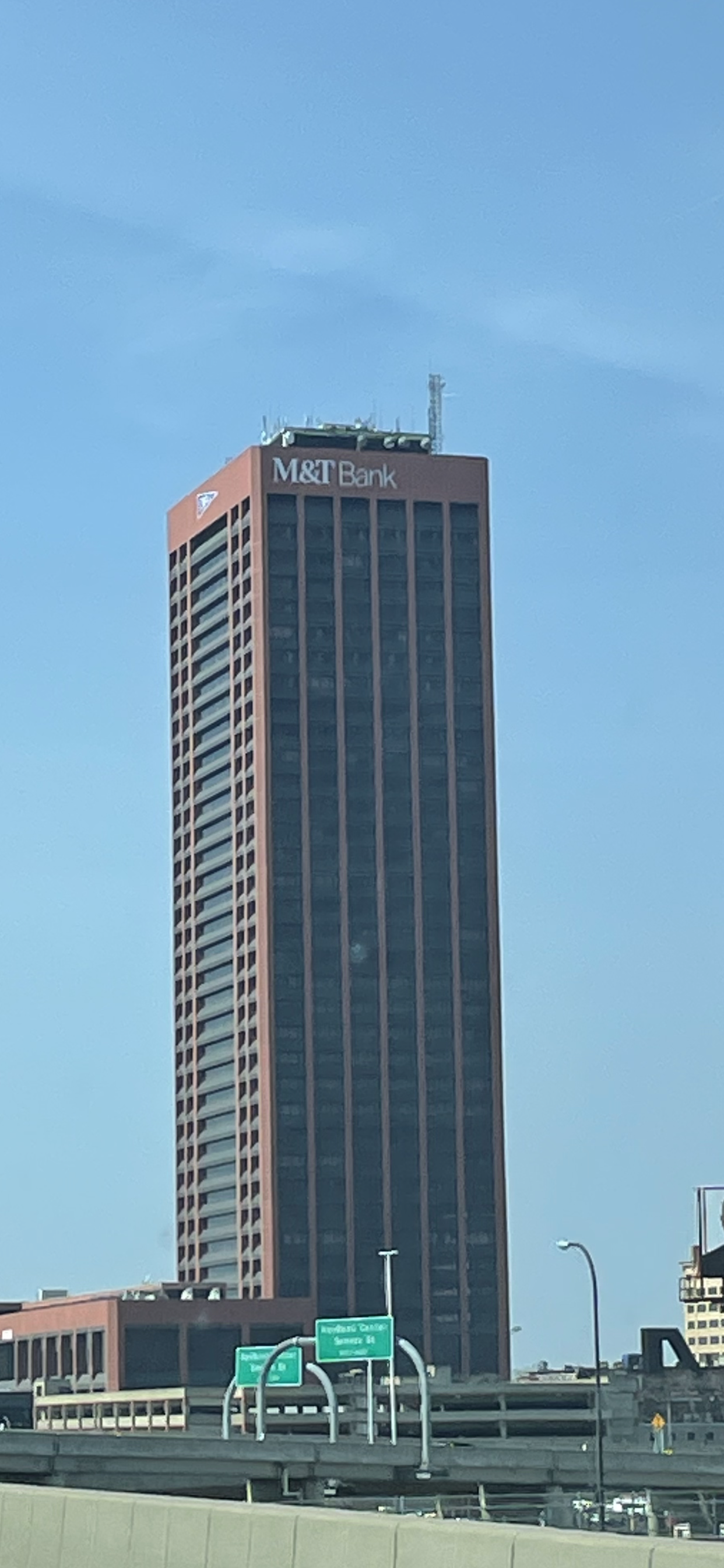
Seneca One Tower pictured in April 2021 after M&T bank sign was added. The Buffalo Bills pennant can also be seen.

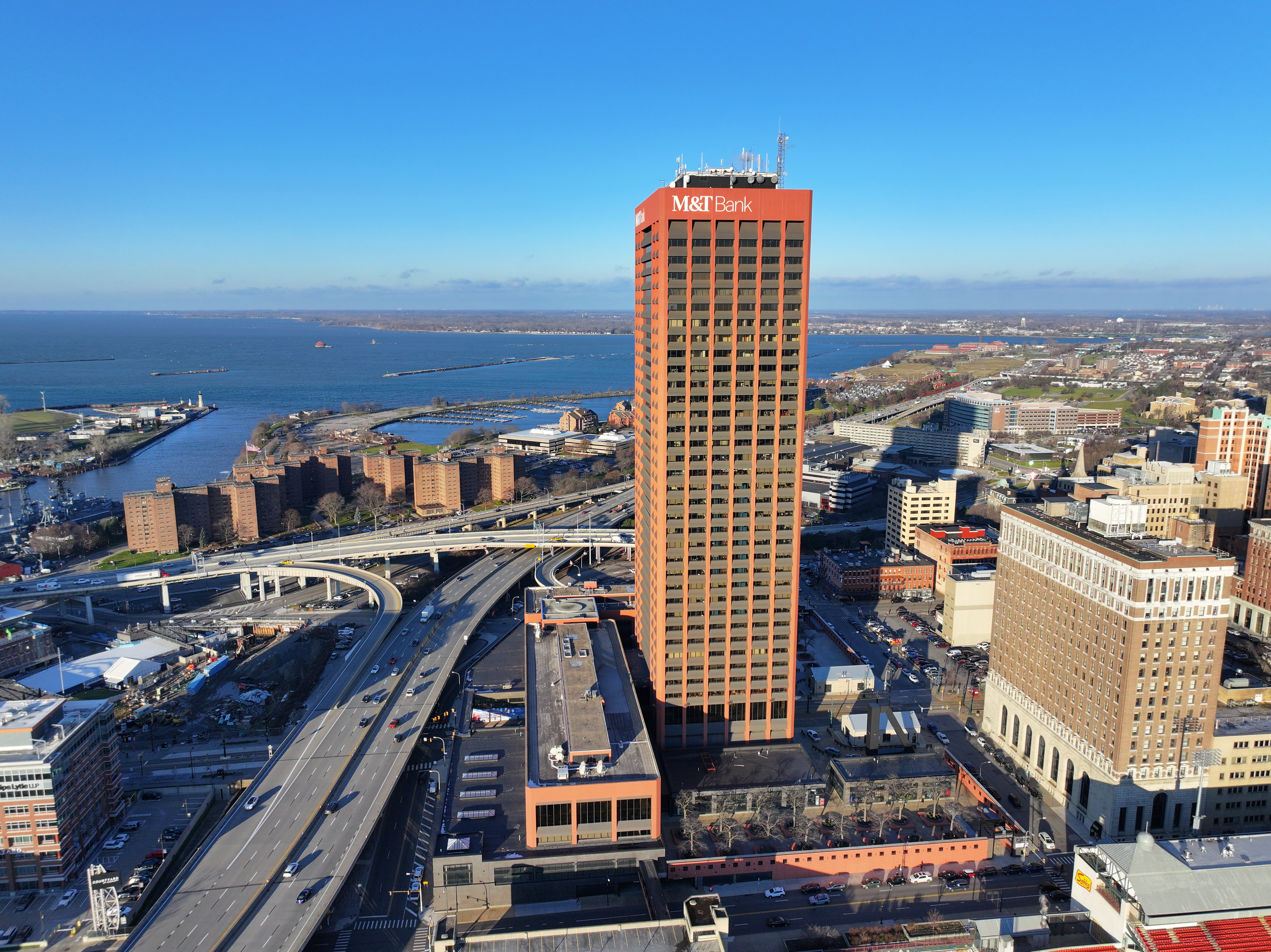
The tower from a drone with Lake Erie in the background, December 2023

== See also ==
- HSBC Buildings around the world
- List of tallest buildings in Buffalo, New York
- List of tallest buildings in Upstate New York
