= DL&W station =

Light rail station in Buffalo, New York

DL&W
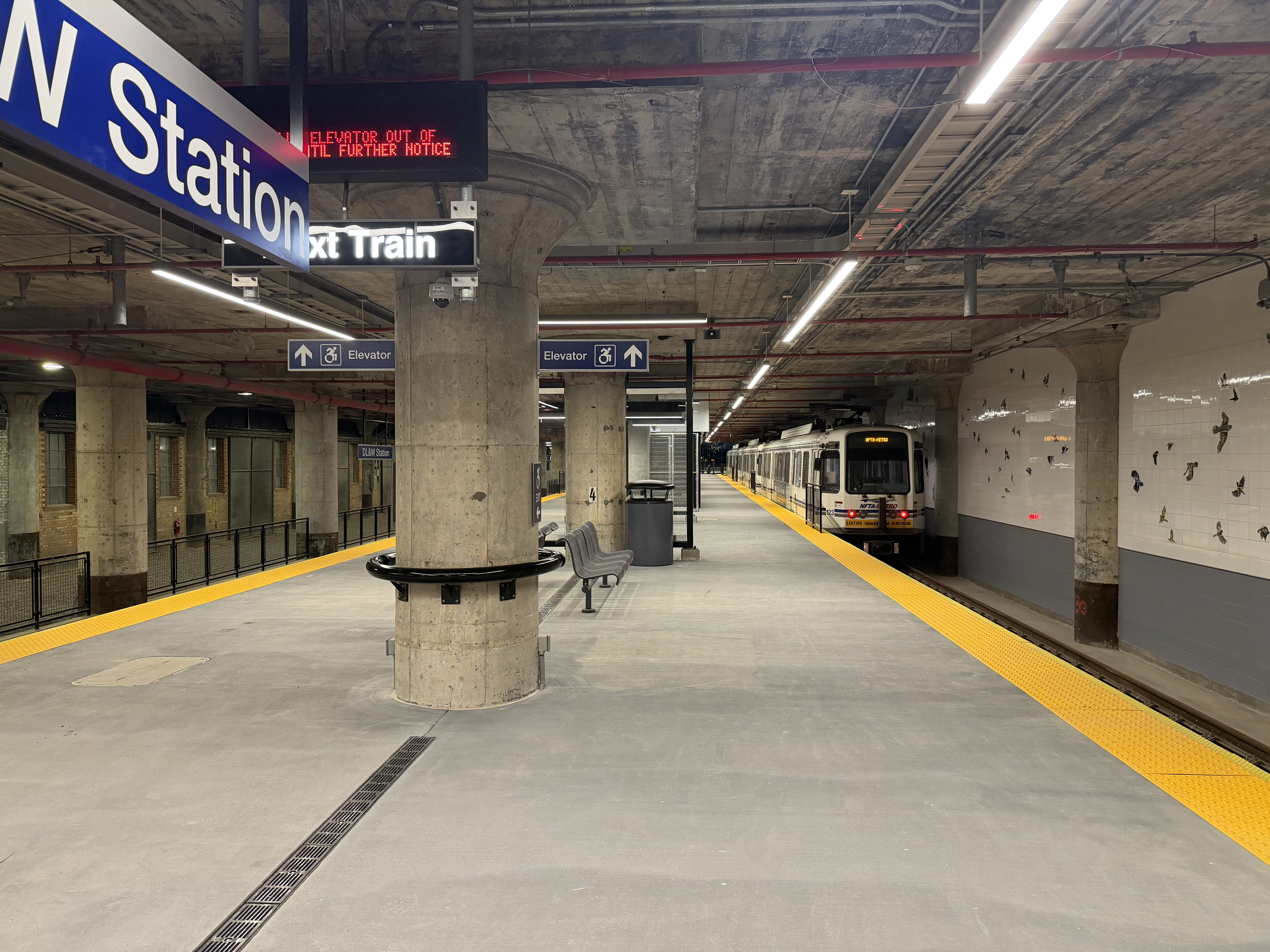
- Platform of the DL&W station

General information
- Coordinates: 42°52′22″N 78°52′27″W
- Owner: NFTA
- Tracks: 2

Construction
- Structure type: At-grade
- Accessible: yes

Other information
- Fare zone: Free fare

History
- Opened: December 8, 2025

Services
Preceding station	NFTA	Following station
Canalside toward University	Metro Rail	Terminus
Location

DL&W station is a Buffalo Metro Rail light rail indoor station on the first floor on the Buffalo River side of the former Delaware, Lackawanna and Western Railroad terminal, which also serves as the NFTA Rail Maintenance Yard. The station replaced the former Special Events station and will provide commuters access to parking, Metro Rail service to the city, and a direct pedestrian walkway to Canalside areas. It was the first expansion of the line since it was completed in 1986.

A second entrance, via the second floor of the terminal, to the station from South Park Avenue at Illinois Street is under construction.

Plans for the terminal, when finished, also include an enclosed pedestrian skywalk from the second floor over South Park Avenue to the KeyBank Center.

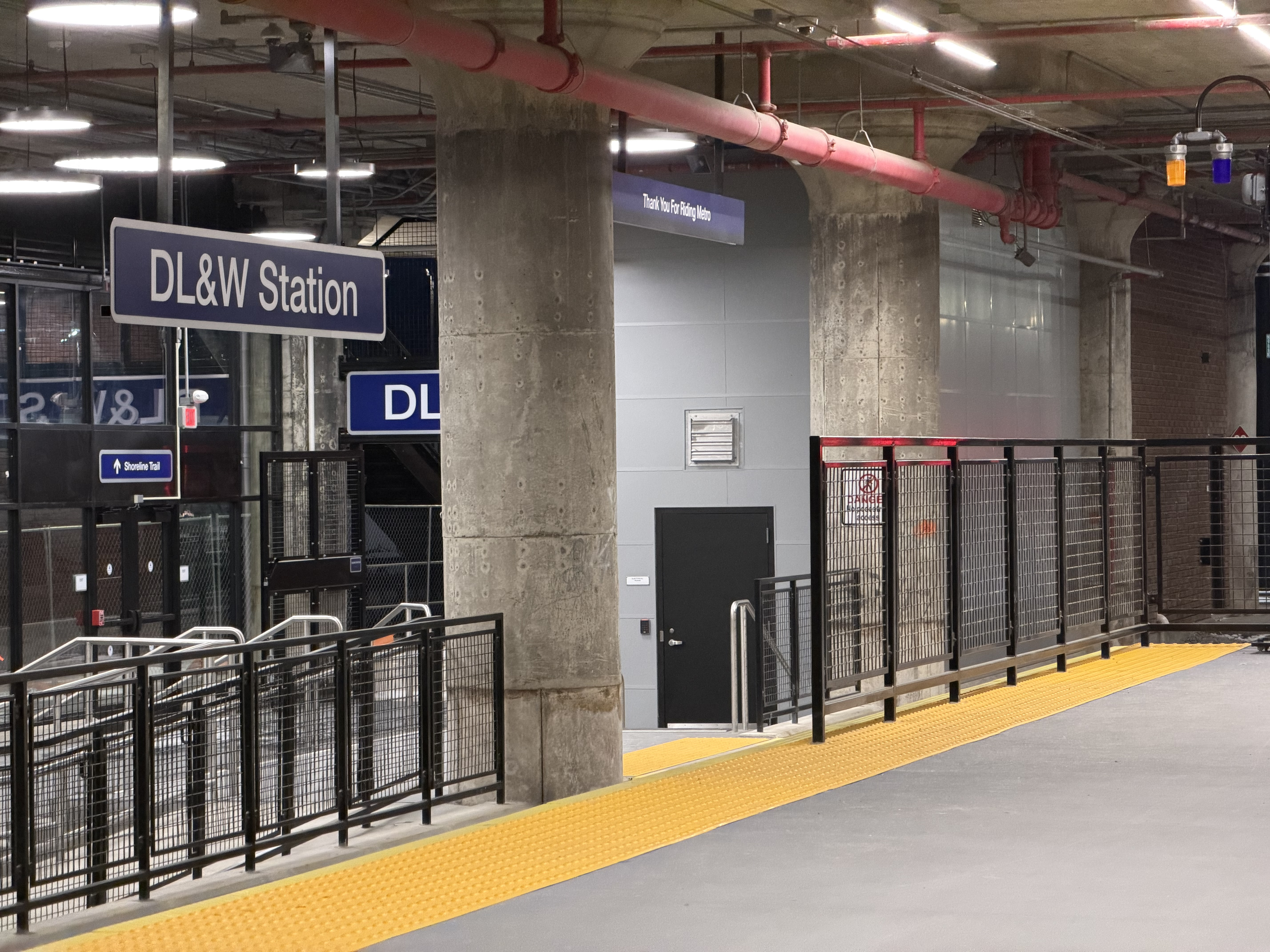
Shoreline Trail entrance to DL&W station

Additionally, a new crosswalk was constructed from behind the KeyBank Center to Canalside, and the Riverwalk trail along the Buffalo River. The $1.7 million crossing was newly added to the plan, and will provide safe access across Metro Rail tracks to the increasingly busy area at the foot of Main Street.

== Artwork ==
DL&W station is home to two pieces of work, Birds of Buffalo, a mural from Joan Linder, and Tapestry, a sculpture from Harumo Sato.
