= Theater station =

Former light rail station in Buffalo, New York

Theater
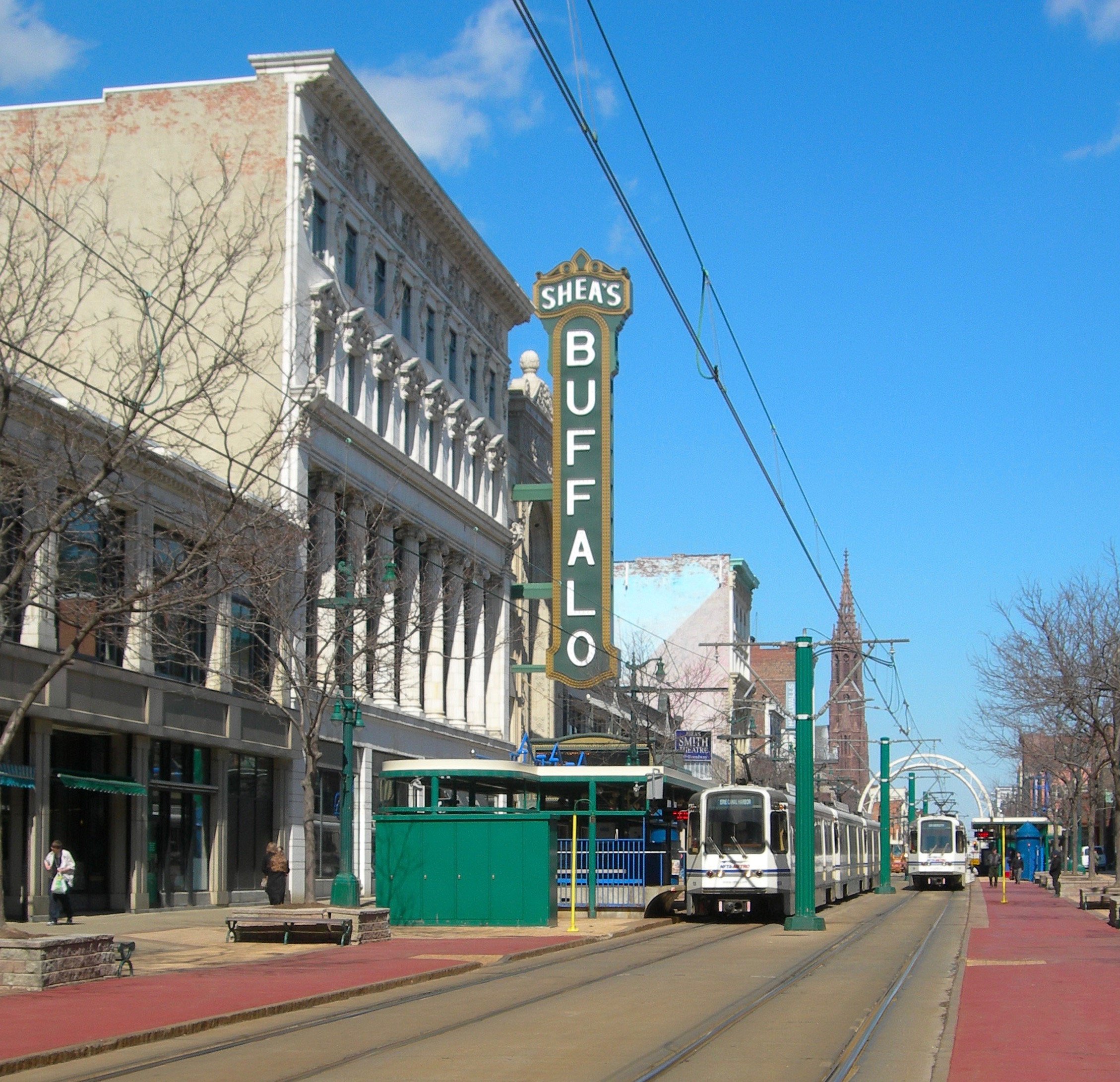
- Theater station's outbound platform with Shea's Performing Arts Center in the background

General information
- Location: Main Street; Buffalo, New York
- Coordinates: 42°53′29″N 78°52′21″W
- Owner: NFTA
- Platforms: 2 low-level side platforms
- Tracks: 2

Construction
- Structure type: At-grade
- Accessible: yes

Other information
- Status: Permanently closed
- Fare zone: Free fare (inbound); Paid fare (outbound)

History
- Opened: October 9, 1984; 41 years ago
- Closed: February 18, 2013; 13 years ago

Former services
Preceding station	NFTA	Following station
Allen/Medical Campus toward University	Metro Rail	Fountain Plaza toward Erie Canal Harbor or Special Events
Location

Theater station was a Buffalo Metro Rail station that served the entertainment and theater districts of downtown Buffalo, New York located in the 600 block of Main Street between Chippewa and Tupper Streets at the north end of the Free Fare Zone, where customers traveling north are required to have proof-of-payment.

== History ==
From October 9, 1984, to May 18, 1985, Theater station served as the original northern terminus, as Metro Rail officially opened for regular service on May 20, 1985. From May 20, 1985, to November 10, 1986, due to construction issues at LaSalle, Amherst Street served as the northern terminus. Prior to 2005, Theater station served as the southern terminus, as the Taste of Buffalo was held along Main Street between Chippewa and Church Streets (it has since moved to Delaware Avenue between West Chippewa and West Eagle Streets). Since November 10, 1986, University station serves as the northern terminus. Prior to February 18, 2013, Theater station was the last above-ground station, with the subway portal directly north of the station, which caused safety issues partially leading to decision to close rather than relocate the station.

== Closure ==
Theater station permanently closed on February 18, 2013, in order to be demolished to make way for the return of vehicular traffic to the 600 block of Main Street. The Buffalo Theatre District is now served by Fountain Plaza station, located 546 feet (166 m) south.

== Notable places nearby ==
Theater station was located near:

- Alleyway Theatre
- Andrews Theatre
- Buffalo United Artists
- Babeville
- Courier Express Building
- Irish Classical Theatre Company
- Market Arcade Building
- AMC Market Arcade 8
- Road Less Traveled Theatre
- Shea's 710 Theatre
- 710 Main Street Theatre
- Trinity Episcopal Church

== See also ==
- List of Buffalo Metro Rail stations
