= List of free public transport routes =

This is a list of zero-fare public transport routes, especially limited zero-fare routes within a wider fare-paying network.

== Australia ==
=== Australian Capital Territory ===
==== Former services ====
- Canberra: ACTION operated the free "Downtowner" route around the city centre from 1991 until 1998.
- On 4 February 2013, ACTION commenced operating the "Centenary Loop" which was numbered as route 100. It operated around the city centre and parliamentary triangle to celebrate the centenary of Canberra. It ceased operation on 5 January 2014.
- ACTION operated a free weekday service (Route 101) around the city centre from 2016 until 2019.

=== New South Wales ===
- Homebush Bay: Punchbowl Bus Company operates the Baylink Shuttle, a weekday bus circulator between Rhodes railway station and Wentworth Point at 10 to 15 minute intervals between 06:30 and 19:00.
- Manly has four free "Hop, Skip & Jump" minibus services that operate in the municipality.
- Parramatta: In August 2008 Transdev NSW commenced operating a service around the CBD. The service is operated as part of the region 3 contract by Transit Systems as route 900.
- Wollongong: In 2009, Premier Illawarra commenced operating a free loop service in both directions connecting the University of Wollongong, North Wollongong station, Wollongong station, Wollongong Central and beach, running at intervals of 10 or 20 minutes. Route 55A operates in an anti-clockwise direction, 55C in a clockwise direction.

==== Former services ====
- On 15 December 1975, the Public Transport Commission commenced operating free route 777 around the Sydney central business district. It ceased in December 1989.
- On 3 December 2008, Sydney Buses commenced operating a free city loop service around the Sydney central business district. Route 555 operated in both directions via Bridge Street, George Street, Eddy Avenue and Elizabeth Street. It was later altered to operate up and down George Street from Circular Quay to Railway Square. It ceased in October 2015 due to commencement of construction of a light rail line, that is not free.
- Willoughby: The City of Willoughby contracted Transdev NSW to operate a daily free bus loop route that connects St Leonards station with the Artarmon industrial area.
- Newcastle: Newcastle Transport operated a free bus zone in the CBD area between 07:30 and 18:00. This ceased with the introduction of Newcastle Light Rail in February 2019.

=== Queensland ===
- Brisbane:
  - Transport for Brisbane operates free bus trips on weekdays in the Brisbane central business district on route 30 – between the CBD and Spring Hill – and on routes 40 and 50, which mirror each other – one running clockwise and the other counterclockwise – varying due to the Brisbane CBD's one-way street grid. The service is smaller than that of other cities.
  - Public transport services in the greater Brisbane area are free, on event days, for holders of valid game-day tickets to NRL, AFL, national/international T20, ODI and test cricket events.
- Sunshine Coast: Noosa Council have partnered with Translink to provide free buses within the Noosa Shire every weekend and during the busy Christmas and Easter Queensland school holidays.
  - The Go Noosa Holidays service includes Translink services 626, 627, 628, 629, and 632 and Noosa Council's 065 Go Noosa Loop Bus and 064 Peregian Beach to Noosa Heads (Christmas and Easter holidays only).
  - The Go Noosa Weekends service is a 12-month trial from the 12 February 2022 to the 12 February 2023 and includes Translink services 626, 627, 628, 629 and 632 only.

=== South Australia ===
Adelaide has free travel on the following routes:

- Tram routes within the city centre, to the Adelaide Festival Centre and to the Adelaide Entertainment Centre.
- On the Glenelg tram line between Brighton Road and Jetty Road in Glenelg.
- The City Connector:
  - A free bi-directional loop route, 99A and 99C also operates city centre.
  - A free bi-directional loop route, 98A and 98C (formerly called the Adelaide Connector), between the CBD and North Adelaide.
- The "Game Changer Footy Express" bus services are free to ticketholders of valid AFL game day tickets.
- Free community bus services operate in the suburbs of Glenelg and Port Adelaide.

==== Temporary services ====
- During "Mad March", when the Adelaide Fringe, Adelaide Festival, WOMADelaide, Writers' Week and Adelaide 500 events, there is a limited free bus service in the CBD.

==== Previous services ====
- 97A and 97C buses linked the old with the new Royal Adelaide Hospital initially. The service ceased when the new tram extension opened in 2018.
- Years before that, a city service known as 99B used to ply King William Street from North Terrace to South Terrace, but this was terminated after the Glenelg tram extension up to North Terrace.

=== Tasmania ===
- Launceston: Metro Tasmania operates a free service around the central business district.
- Free public transport (coaches, buses and ferries) on all routes from 30 March 2026 to 30 June 2026, as an incentive not to drive due to the escalation in fuel prices resulting from the war in the Middle East.

=== Victoria ===
- Melbourne: Since 1994, Yarra Trams has operated a free tram around the city centre. In 2015, free travel within the Melbourne central business district was introduced covering the city centre, the Queen Victoria Market and Docklands. Between the 30 November 2025 and 1 February 2026 on weekends, all public transport in Victoria is free to passengers after the opening of the Metro Tunnel.
- Free public transport (trains, trams and buses) on all routes from 31 March 2026 to 30 April 2026, as an incentive not to drive due to the escalation in fuel prices resulting from the war in the Middle East.

=== Western Australia ===
- Perth: Transperth operates free bus and train trips within the Perth central business district (the Free Transit Zone), including five high-frequency Central Area Transit (CAT) bus loops. Free CAT bus services also operate in the centres of Fremantle and Joondalup.

== Belgium ==
- Ghent: free night bus services (weekends only).
- Leuven: free night bus services (weekends only).

== Canada ==
- Calgary, Alberta: Free C-Train light rail transit within the downtown core (the "7th Avenue Free Fare Zone").
- Halifax, Nova Scotia: Free bus route around the downtown area in summer.
- Toronto, Ontario: Free Terminal Link at Toronto Pearson International Airport (YYZ).
- Vancouver, British Columbia: Free Canada Line SkyTrain for travel between stations on Sea Island.

== Czech Republic ==
- Hradec Králové, Czech Republic: All city buses and trolleybuses between the main train station and the new central bus terminal, since 5 July 2008.

== Faroe Islands ==
- Tórshavn, Faroe Islands: The municipality of the capital city Tórshavn offers free bus service.

== France ==
- Calais, France: A free bus called the Balad'in runs from Boulevard La Fayette (or more precisely Jardin-des-Plante, in the town centre) to the beach and back every 10 minutes. Three buses operate on Monday to Saturday from 8:55 am and with the last departures at 6:47 pm (beach) and 7:02 pm (town centre).
- Paris, France has frequent free transport routes that run around the Eurodisney Park and connect to hotels and alternative public transport routes nearby. There is also a free shuttle bus that connects the 'Centre Commercial Belle Epine' to a housing estate owned by Silic (fr:Silic) in the southern district of Orly.
- Tarbes in France offers a year-long free shuttle bus around the city, linking the main spots.
- Saint-Fons, in the south of Lyon, offer a free minibus line all around the city.
- All the tramway and buses in Aubagne are free - See Tramway in Aubagne.

== Germany ==
- Augsburg has a City-Zone in the city centre where one can use the Tram for free. People can use this opportunity moving within the City-Zone or while entering or leaving it.

== Greece ==
- Marousi, a wealthy northern suburb in Athens, Greece has small municipal bus shuttles (of red colour) which can be used for free by anyone.

== Luxembourg ==
- In the beginning of 2020, Luxembourg will offer free public transit on all routes nationwide in an effort to relieve traffic congestion and prioritize environmental policy.

== India ==
- Tirumalai (Tirupati), India: Free buses run by Temple authority to visit the nearby religious centres on the top of the hill.

== Indonesia ==
- Jakarta: Free bus services run by TransJakarta bus routes GR1 Harmoni - Bundaran Senayan & GR2 Tanah Abang Explorer. TransJakarta also serves six free city tour bus routes using double-deck buses to promote Jakarta's tour sites.

== Malaysia ==
- Kuala Lumpur: The Go KL City Bus plying around Kuala Lumpur CBD focusing on tourist spots currently operated by Handal Indah & SKS Bus.
- Petaling Jaya: The PJ City Bus, a free bus service funded by Petaling Jaya City Council (MBPJ).
- Ampang Jaya, Kajang, Klang, Selayang, Sepang, Subang Jaya and Shah Alam: The Smart Selangor Bus, a free bus service operated by Rapid Bus funded by Selangor State Government.
- Penang: The CAT Penang Bus, a free bus service funded by Penang State Government.
- Seberang Jaya, Penang has a free weekday bus operated by Rapid Penang from Sunway Business Centre in Seberang Jaya to Bayan Lepas targeting industrial area workforce namely Bridge Express Shuttle Transit (BEST).
- Johor: Bas Muafakat Johor is a free bus service programme funded by the state government of Johor.
- Kuching: Kuching Metro route 103.

== Netherlands ==
- Dordrecht has a free bus and ferry, some Saturdays at the end of each year.
- Noordwijk/Oegstgeest – Leiden Transferium – The Hague had an express bus, running on weekdays during daytime, free of charge as a test during 2004; it was intended for commuters working in The Hague and living in Leiden or beyond who would otherwise travel by car to the Hague, to promote parking at the Transferium and continuing the journey by bus; the aim was to reduce road traffic congestion between Leiden and The Hague. The test was paid by the province of South Holland. It was discontinued in 2005.
- Renesse (mun. Schouwen-Duiveland), Netherlands has free bus services in the area (in summer only).
- Amsterdam has a free ferry service on IJ operated by GVB.

== Norway ==
- Stavanger: From 3 July 2023, ferries, busses and trains were made free for residents of the municipality of Stavanger.

== Russia ==
- Chelyabinsk: free express bus route from Aloe pole through Revolution square to "Gorki" mall since 2007 until at least 2014.
- Miass, Chelyabinsk Oblast: trolleybuses and buses (both city and suburban routes) since 1 March 1991 until 31 July 2001.
- Moscow, Russia:
  - Free buses stop near Auchan shopping centers near Pravoberezhnaya (RightBank) Street, Sevastopolsky Lane, and Mytishchi city. The buses are unofficially used by local residents and offices and even have an unofficial "A" number. There are two more services from shopping centers that were bought from Metro Cash & Carry. In 2020, there was free bus service available from a total of 12 Auchan hypermarkets, plus from Leroy Merlin.
  - There are free buses from the Sadovod and South Gate trade areas, from 6:00 to 18:00, to four metro stations and between the markets, as well as to Moscow trade center. These routes don't have any intermediate stops except for the "Bird market" and a stop near Mega trade center (from about 15:00).
  - The Stankolit platform area was serviced by a variety of free routes because this area is not accessible except by long walk during the daytime from November 2002 (the tram service was terminated, low train service by mornings and evenings, at 21 November 2019 railway service was terminated but the ability remained and even assigned transfer rule at metro Savelovskaya).
  - During Easter Sundays, the Sunday before and after, buses and some trolleys to cemeteries are free but intermediate stops are cancelled unless there is high passengers turnover, park-and-ride stops, or if there is another cemetery (some unique track routes keep all stops). The system is criticised because it lowers service on regular routes and religious areas. In the Zelenograd district the routes do not change (except discarding peak hours two-stops branch on route 1 and 2) and are free to the cemetery and to riders originating at cemeteries (because cemeteries are terminus stops at all routes), otherwise requires a fare.
- Moscow Oblast and Vladimirskaya oblast (90 km-Alexandrov-157 km)
  - Trains on Big Circle Railway road are free at most times due to very low rider traffic (3 to 6 pairs per day), the fare is required only on some stops that allow transfer with main directions from the Moscow and parts on Kazanskaya railway or Yaroslavskaya railway unless the conductor goes in the train (penalty fare does not apply, the cash offices are the exceptions on this road). Exemptions on this road are restricted (valid only if this is a federal exemption, other only if the train to Moscow city exits from this platform, and even split later or cancelled), however about half of this circle is free (but may be charged during events, for example 165 km (from Manichino) to Kubinka 1 then to park Patriot and Aprelevka depot train). In Vladimirskaya oblast exemptions valid 90 km-158 km-Sanino for this and 40 km-Alexandrov (also Balakirevo but direct trains only) to Moscow/MO. Students have a 50% discount valid in Moscow, but no ISIC is accepted. In Vladimirskaya oblast only if a two way ticket was purchased (as return coupon).
  - Buses to Globus (hypermarket) in Pushkino (earlier to Shelkovo, two routes were diverted later) and Podolsk allow to ride about 20 km for free, and free return with a small purchase required. Many routes have unique tracks, and even one unique stop (in city). In additional they have one route from 2 metro stations to Krasnogorsk shop (shared with Leroy Merlin).
- Football: On the game days only (+4 hours after the end) in 2017/2018 all S-bahn trains (but limited to border of the subject where the match goes +Moscow oblast, Leningradskaya oblast or termini station, for example to Klin is free, to Redkino or Tver not, for Nara is free, Obninsk is not) and metro in Moscow, Saint Peterburg, Kazan, Samara, Ekaterinburg, premetre (tram) in Volgograd are free with Fan ID and ticket. And some bus, trolleybus and tram routes. In addition booking for specialized trains is available.
  - may book.
  - must use the assigned trains (game day ± 2–3 days) for free. The most popular trains like Red Arrow and Sapsan remains paid.
  - must register at police/MFC/hotel with 24 hours at 2017, 72 hours at 2018 from arriving if you stay for 2 nights in single city (Russia/Belarus by 3 days).
  - you may book two tickets for one match but from/to the same city, or book only one. The total number is unlimited (in Confederation cup all 3+2 matches or even 3*2+2 if move from Moscow and Saint Peterburg).
  - FAN must check at turnstile and keep the football ticket for return from the game and don't foul.
  - these trains go without stops (in 2018 some trains had 3 city concept, in Sochi probably also may disembark at first stop).
  - Aeroexpress trains in Moscow are free within two days of game days at any time but are limited to two trips per Fan ID. The full-stops trains to DME, bus 911 to VKO and SVO-SPARTAK shuttle are free on game day only and do not count towards that limit.
  - Maximum zero fare were on game day to fans. Adjustment days to Long range trains, aeroexpress trains but not on linked. Also available Aeroflot planes (only 5 rur or US$0.1, Russian games and passport only).
- Voronezh, Russia: buses with letter "H" (n) were free to anybody and go by their own network and timetable.
- Yekaterinburg: buses between subway station "Geologicheskaya" and MEGA mall.

== Serbia ==
- Belgrade: public transportation (buses, trams, trolleybuses and urban trains) is free since 1 January 2025, making Belgrade the biggest city in Europe to use free public transport.
- Niš: public transportation is free since 1 July 2025.

== Taiwan ==
- Taichung, Taiwan has a free bus service within the first 10 kilometers for Easycard or iPASS users.

== Thailand ==
- Bangkok, Thailand has a free bus service with 800 buses along 73 routes.

== United Kingdom ==
- Wales: TrawsCymru bus services are free nationally on weekends. Routes served include:
  - T1 (Aberystwyth-Carmarthen)
  - T1C (Aberystwyth-Carmarthen-Cardiff)
  - T1S (Carmarthen-Swansea)
  - T2 (Bangor-Dollgellau)
  - T3 (Wrexham-Barmouth)
  - T4 (Newtown-Cardiff)
  - T5 (Aberystwyth-Haverfordwest)
  - T6 (Brecon-Neath-Swansea)
  - T9 (Cardiff City Centre-Cardiff Bay-Cardiff Airport)
  - T12 (Machynlleth-Newtown-Wrexham)
  - T14 (Cardiff-Merthyr Tydfil-Hay on Wye-Hereford) (free only if journey started in Wales)
- Greater Manchester:
  - Bolton Metroshuttle bus services link Bolton railway station, bus station and town centre leisure attractions.
  - Manchester Metroshuttle bus services operate every 5 minutes on route 1 and every 10 minutes on routes 2 and 3. These busses operate in Manchester city centre between 07:00 and 19:00. Three different routes connect Piccadilly, Victoria, Oxford Road, Deansgate and Salford Central railway stations, Shudehill Interchange, Chorlton Street and Piccadilly Gardens bus and coach terminal, Metrolink tram stations and National Car Parks with other areas of the city.
  - Oldham Metroshuttle links Oldham Mumps tram stop with the bus station, sports centre and shopping centre.
  - Stockport Metroshuttle links Stockport railway station with the bus station, supermarkets and leisure attractions. This service was formerly known as the Stockport Shuttlebus, but was rebranded in line with other zero-fare bus services in Greater Manchester.
- Greenhithe, North Kent has a free bus service to the Bluewater Shopping Centre; users must have a valid train ticket which names Greenhithe station.
- London
  - Heathrow Express, Elizabeth line and Piccadilly line services between Hatton Cross, Heathrow Central, Terminal 4 and Terminal 5 are free.
  - The Woolwich Free Ferry provides a route for cars and pedestrians across the River Thames between Woolwich and North Woolwich in East London.
- Oxford: A 15-seater minibus is run by Geo, an American Immigration Corporation to take passengers on the half-hour journey between Oxford railway station and Campsfield House detention centre near the village of Kidlington and Oxford Airport. It runs every hour, and then every two hours, all afternoon, 7 days a week.
- South Yorkshire, in the two locations of Sheffield and Rotherham, zero-fare city/town centre circular routes operated under the FreeBee branding, the first in the city of Sheffield was launched in 2007, and after its success the scheme was rolled out to Rotherham in 2009. Both were funded by the South Yorkshire Passenger Transport Executive.
  - Rotherham: FreeBee runs from Rotherham Interchange every 12 minutes from 08:00 to 18:00 Monday to Saturday.
  - Sheffield: FreeBee ran around the city centre, Monday to Saturday, every seven minutes. The service ended in 2014 due to budget constraints.
- Southampton: City-link bus between Southampton Central station, Westquay shopping centre and Town Quay for the Isle of Wight ferry services. It is operated for Southampton City Council by Bluestar.
- West Midlands: From 9 December to 13 December 2024, bus travel is free to use from 7pm onwards.
- West Yorkshire, four of the larger settlements covered by the West Yorkshire Metro have zero-fare bus services which are jointly funded by West Yorkshire Metro, local councils and private companies. The services are branded either FreeTownBus or FreeCityBus, depending on whether the location is a town or city (Leeds's FreeCityBus service replaced by LeedsCityBus in 2011, which requires fare-paying or multi-journey tickets for travel):
  - Bradford: FreeCityBus - a free loop service around the city centre.
  - Dewsbury: FreeTownBus - the latest FreeTownBus in West Yorkshire, it was launched in December 2009.
  - Huddersfield: FreeTownBus - a free loop around the town centre operated by Tiger Blue.
  - Wakefield: FreeCityBus - free circular route around the city centre.

== United States ==
- Amherst, Massachusetts: Free buses servicing the Amherst area. The buses UMass Transit Services runs as part of the PVTA bus system have no fare for Five College students as well as the general public. These buses include the 30, 31, 33, 34, 35, 36, 38, 39, 45, and 46. The B43 and R29 buses, which also service the Five College system, are run by Valley Area Transit Company and Springfield Area Transit Company, respectively, and use the standard PVTA fares for the general public. However, during academic semesters, Five College student IDs are accepted as a form of payment.
- Ann Arbor, Michigan offers free bus services between University of Michigan campuses and student housing. Note that most large universities provide a similar kind of bus service. The city bus service, the AAATA, is free for students, faculty, and staff of the University of Michigan. The AAATA also runs a service called "the Link" which runs between downtown and campus area and is currently free (for everyone) to ride. While individual rides are "free", typically students pay a transportation service fee as part of their tuition and fee charges.
- Baltimore, Maryland has the Charm City Circulator; 4 routes of up to ≈ 5 km (3.1 mi) crossing city center in various directions.
- Bennington, Vermont has the Green Mountain Express Emerald Line is a fare-free route between there and Wilmington operating weekday afternoons, morning trips are run in collaboration with the Southeast Vermont Transit's "MOOver".
- The Berkshire Regional Transit Authority offers free bus and Paratransit service throughout Berkshire, Massachusetts.
- Boston:
  - The Silver Line (SL1) route from the Boston General Edward Lawrence Int'l Logan Airport to South Station.
  - The Massport shuttle buses provide a free connection with various areas relatively close to the Boston Logan International Airport including: MBTA Blue Line (Airport station), MBTA Commuter Boat (Water Transportation Dock), and the Rental Car Center.
  - Several MBTA bus routes (pilot program).
- Buffalo, New York offers free Metro Rail transit from Special Events Station to Theater Station.
- Charlottesville, Virginia: A free motorized trolley links the campus of the University of Virginia to the downtown area.
- Corvallis, Oregon: Transit system is entirely fare-free.
- Dallas, Texas:
  - The M-Line Trolley heritage trolley transports riders along a three-mile stretch from downtown to uptown McKinney Avenue seven days a week, 365 days a year.
  - Dallas Area Rapid Transit operates the D-Link, a free shuttle bus that provides service to various attractions in Downtown Dallas.
- Denver, Colorado has a free 16th Street Mall shuttle bus downtown between Civic Center and Union Station. To replace an aging fleet of iconic hybrid buses, in 2015, RTD ordered a new BYD fleet, expecting delivery by the end of 2016 but fleet delivery was delayed into summer 2017. In spring 2014, RTD added a new rush-hour MetroRide route between Union Station and Civic Center Station along 18th and 19th Streets. From 6-9 am and 3-6 pm, the 60-foot articulated buses run at 5-minute intervals.
- East Palo Alto, California has a free East Palo Alto Community Shuttle.
- Grand Rapids, Michigan: The Downtown Area Shuttle or DASH is a free system of small buses connecting key downtown Grand Rapids locations and parking lots.
- Houston, Texas: The 412 Greenlink Downtown Circulator Bus uses environmentally friendly Compressed Natural Gas (CNG) buses to provide free weekday service to major office buildings and free weekend service and evening service Thursday, Friday and Saturday nights serving the Theater District and Toyota Center sports venue.
- Hyannis, Massachusetts: CCRTA operates a free shuttle loop on Main Street and many of the downtown beaches during July and August each year.
- Jacksonville, Florida: Jacksonville Transportation Authority operates a free people mover system in Downtown Jacksonville called the Skyway.
- Kansas City, Missouri: RideKC operates a free streetcar in Downtown Kansas City called the KC Streetcar.
- Lancaster, California: Antelope Valley Transit Authority offers free rides to all riders who are senior citizens, disabled, active military, and veterans, on all its local fixed routes buses (With ID).
- Las Vegas, Nevada: Resort shuttle and trams are free, Mandalay Bay Tram, Aria Express and Hard Rock-Treasure Island Tram.
- Logan, Utah: The Cache Valley Transit District serves the City of Logan, Utah and the Cache County area based on a sales tax. Special rides are available to the disabled and extra buses available for during rush periods for university and public education students. Limited service Saturdays; no service Sundays.
- Long Beach, California: The “Passport” shuttles are free within the downtown area (west of Alamitos Ave.)
- Maui County, Hawaii: The Maui Bus, on the Kahului and Wailuku Loop, plus the Lahaina Villager Routes.
- Miami, Florida: Miami Metromover is a free people mover in Downtown Miami.
- Milwaukee, Wisconsin: The Hop is a 2.1-mile trolley system in Milwaukee that is free for the inaugural year of service (until November 2019).
- Minneapolis, Minnesota:
  - Select Metro Transit buses are free along Nicollet Mall between the Convention Center and Washington Ave.
  - The University of Minnesota Campus Shuttle has four routes that serve the Minneapolis and nearby St. Paul campuses. The system carried more than 3.5 million riders in 2008.
- Monterey County, California: During the summer, the Monterey-Salinas Transit operates four free routes called the “MST Trolley”, each one going around the downtown areas of one of the four main cities: Monterey, Carmel, Pacific Grove, and Salinas.
- Mountain Village, Colorado offers a free cable car to Telluride and shuttle bus.
- New Haven, Connecticut: The Union Station Shuttle is a free transit bus that operates between Union Station and Downtown. In addition to the train station, the bus also stops at various parking facilities, Gateway Community College, and the New Haven Green at the center of Downtown. The bus runs every 20 minutes from 6 am to 10 pm.
- New York City, New York and vicinity:
  - The AirTrain at JFK Airport is free along the terminal loop, but requires a fare at the Jamaica and Howard Beach stations.
  - The AirTrain at Newark Liberty International Airport is free, except to and from the Amtrak/New Jersey Transit station. In that case, the fare is included in the price of the train ticket. New Jersey Transit monthly pass holders must pay an extra $5.50 to ride AirTrain, unless they set EWR as the source or destination stop for their pass.
  - MTA Regional Bus Operations' Q70 bus route has been permanently fare-free since May 2022. The Q4, B60, Bx18, M116 and S46/96 temporarily became fare-free 24 September 2023, but fares were reinstated 31 August 2024.
  - The Roosevelt Island Red Bus has been fare-free since April 2014.
  - The Staten Island Railway is free of charge to riders originating and terminating at stations other than St. George or Tompkinsville.
  - The Staten Island Ferry operates between Whitehall Terminal, Manhattan and St. George Terminal, Staten Island 24 hours a day, 365 days a year. Fare collection ended in July 1997.
- Oakland, California: There is a free Broadway shuttle that operates along Broadway in downtown.
- Orlando, Florida and vicinity:
  - There is a free downtown circulator called the Lynx Lymmo, also a rare example of free BRT service.
  - Disney Transport provides free bus, ferry, and monorail service within Walt Disney World.
- Palo Alto, California operates two bus lines, the Embarcadero Shuttle and the Crosstown shuttle. Both are free.
- Philadelphia, Pennsylvania offers free transportation between terminals A through E of Philadelphia International Airport on the SEPTA Airport Line trains, which run every 30 minutes. Transportation on this train into Center City Philadelphia and other destinations is available but requires payment. Transportation between the airport terminals can also be accomplished by using concourses and moving walkways and through two free shuttle bus routes operated by US Airways.
- Phoenix, Arizona offers the FLASH Forward and FLASH Back routes from Arizona State University around Tempe, Arizona as well as Orbit routes which serve Tempe.
- Pittsburgh, Pennsylvania offers free public transit on its light rail lines within the downtown area—six stations from Allegheny to First Avenue.
- Portland, Oregon: From 1975 until 2010, all transit service was free within “Fareless Square”, a 330 square-block zone that encompassed all of downtown Portland, and from 2010 to September 2012 it remained free for light rail and streetcar service (but not buses), renamed the “Free Rail Zone”.
- Salt Lake City, Utah: Bus and light-rail service is free within the downtown Free Fare Zone.
- San Francisco, California: A free shuttle is operated between San Francisco State University and Daly City BART.
- San Jose, California: The Santa Clara Valley Transportation Authority bus route 60 is free when boarded at San Jose International Airport and connects to VTA light rail, the Santa Clara Caltrain station, and the future Milpitas BART station. However, it costs normal fare when boarded anywhere other than at the airport.
- Savannah, Georgia: Chatham Area Transit operates the dot Express Shuttle on a 12-stop loop throughout the historic district. In addition the city offers the fare free River Street Streetcar and Savannah Belles Ferry to Hutchinson Island.
- Seattle, Washington: King County Metro buses were free from 6:00 am to 7:00 pm in Downtown Seattle (the "Ride Free Area") until 29 September 2012.
- Springfield, Missouri: Missouri State University operates the Bear Line which is free to the public.
- State College, Pennsylvania: CATA runs four routes that offer bus service between the Penn State campus and downtown State College, an addition to two regional service routes that do not charge fare if they are only traveling across campus.
- Tacoma, Washington: The Tacoma Link light rail operated by Sound Transit has no fare. It runs 1.6 miles (2.6 km) from Tacoma Dome Station into Downtown Tacoma and is anticipated to remain fare-free until 2022.
- Walnut Creek, California: County Connection operates the Route 4, a free shuttle that serves Downtown Walnut Creek.
- Yountville, California has a free shuttle is operated by Napa Vine around Yountville.
