= Fountain Plaza station =

Light rail station in Buffalo, New York

Fountain Plaza
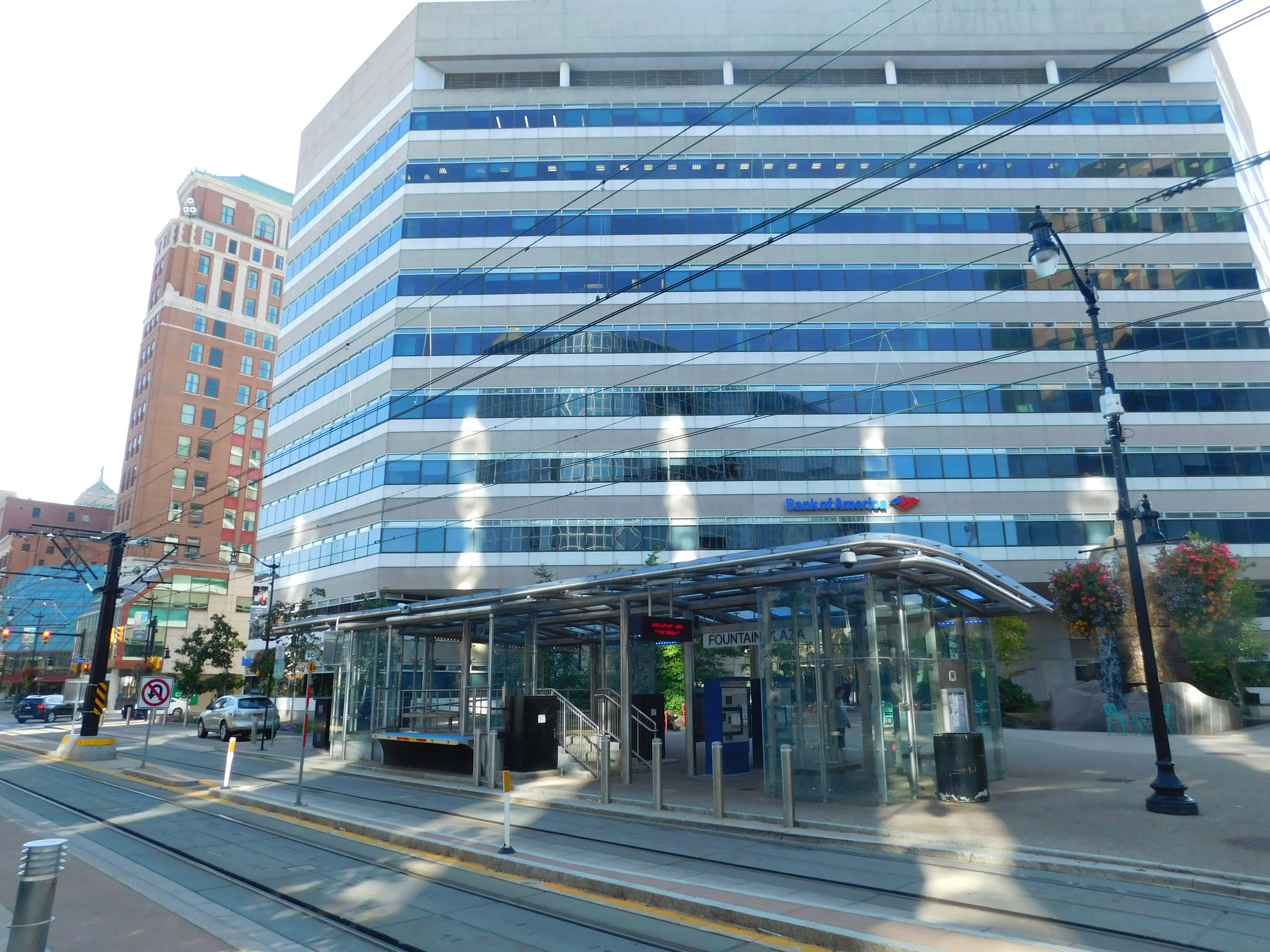
- Fountain Plaza station's inbound platform in September 2019

General information
- Location: 580 Main Street; Buffalo, New York
- Coordinates: 42°53′22″N 78°52′23″W
- Owner: NFTA
- Platforms: 2 low-level side platforms
- Tracks: 2

Construction
- Structure type: At-grade
- Accessible: yes

Other information
- Fare zone: Free fare (inbound); Paid fare (outbound)

History
- Opened: October 9, 1984; 41 years ago
- Rebuilt: March 30 – October 14, 2014; 12 years ago
- Former names: Huron

Passengers
- 2017: 448,928

Services
Preceding station	NFTA	Following station
Allen/Medical Campus toward University	Metro Rail	Lafayette Square toward DL&W
Former services
Preceding station	NFTA	Following station
Theater Closed 2013 toward University	Metro Rail	Lafayette Square toward DL&W
Location

Fountain Plaza station (formerly Huron station) is a Buffalo Metro Rail station located in the 500 block of Main Street between Huron and Chippewa Streets. Fountain Plaza station serves the northern section of the Buffalo Downtown Central Business District and the Buffalo Theater District since the permanent closing of Theater station on February 18, 2013. Fountain Plaza station is at the north end of the Free Fare Zone, where customers traveling north are required to have proof-of-payment.

== Bus connections ==
- At West Chippewa and Pearl Streets (heading south only):
  - 7 Baynes-Richmond (inbound)
  - 8 Main (inbound)
  - 64 Lockport (inbound)
  - 66 Williamsville
  - 67 Cleveland Hill
  - 81 Eastside (inbound)
  - 204 Airport–Downtown Express
- At East Chippewa and Washington Streets (heading south only):
  - 74 Hamburg

== Notable places nearby ==
Fountain Plaza station is located near:

- Alleyway Theatre
- Andrews Theatre
- Babeville
- Courier Express Building
- Market Arcade Building
- Shea's Performing Arts Center
- Trinity Episcopal Church
- Fountain Plaza
- Buffalo Savings Bank (now M & T Bank)
- Calumet Building
- Electric Building
- Genesee Building (now Hyatt Regency Hotel)
- Genesee Hotel (now Olympic Towers)
- New Era Cap Company
- The Avant (formerly Thaddeus J. Dulski Federal Building)

== See also ==
- List of Buffalo Metro Rail stations
