= Leeds City bus station =

Bus station in West Yorkshire, England

Coordinates: 53°47′49″N 1°32′07″W

Leeds City
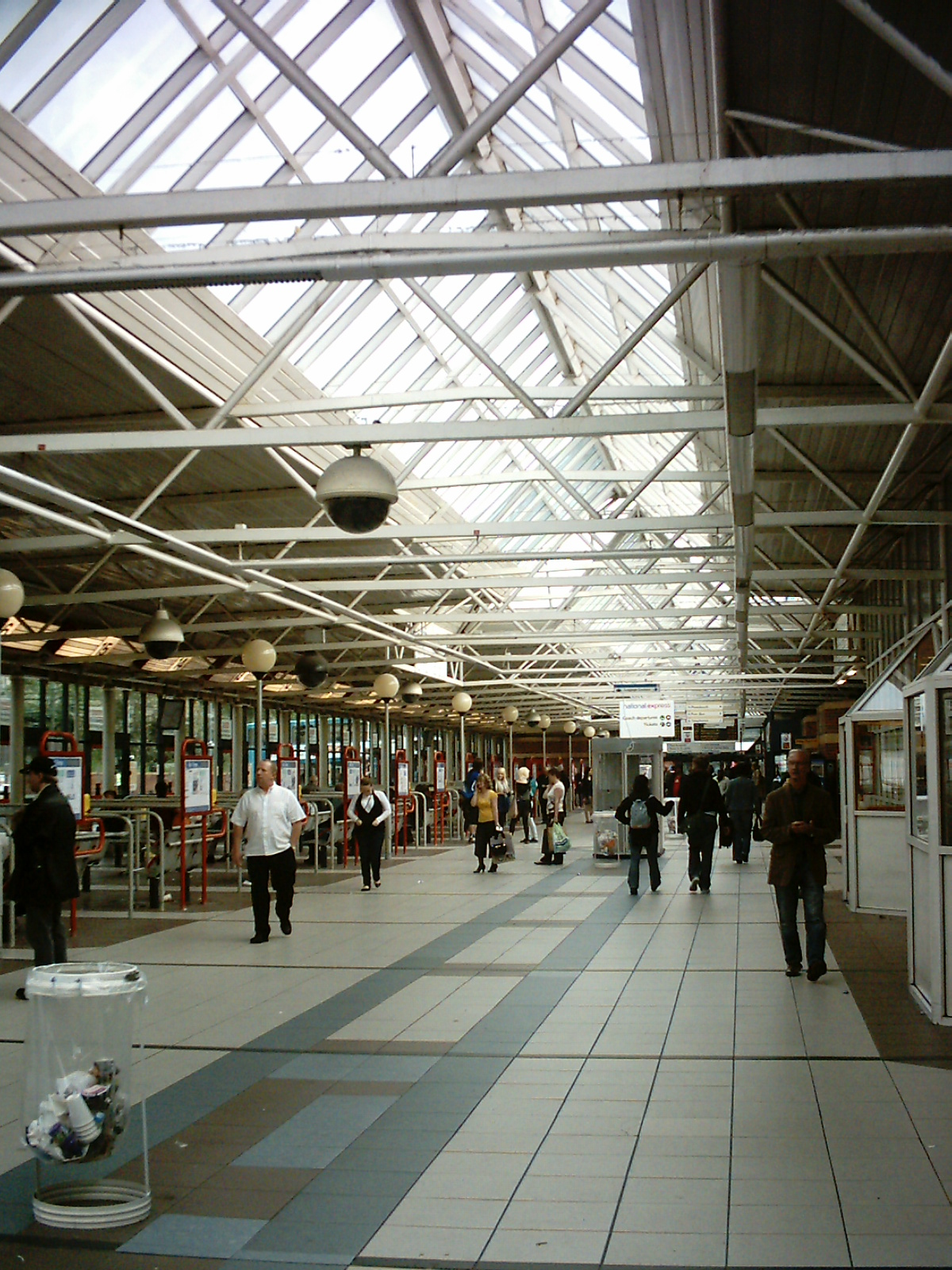

General information
- Other names: Leeds Bus Station
- Location: York Street, Leeds city centre
- Operator: West Yorkshire Metro
- Bus stands: 34
- Bus operators: Arriva Yorkshire; First Leeds; Harrogate Bus Company; Keighley Bus Company; Megabus; Yorkshire Coastliner

Other information
- Website: www.wymetro.com

History
- Opened: 31 August 1938
- Rebuilt: 30 September 1963; 25 March 1996
Location

Leeds City bus station serves the city of Leeds, England. Owned and managed by West Yorkshire Metro, it is situated between the Quarry Hill and Leeds Kirkgate Markets areas of Leeds city centre. The National Express Dyer Street Coach Station adjoins the bus station.

== History ==
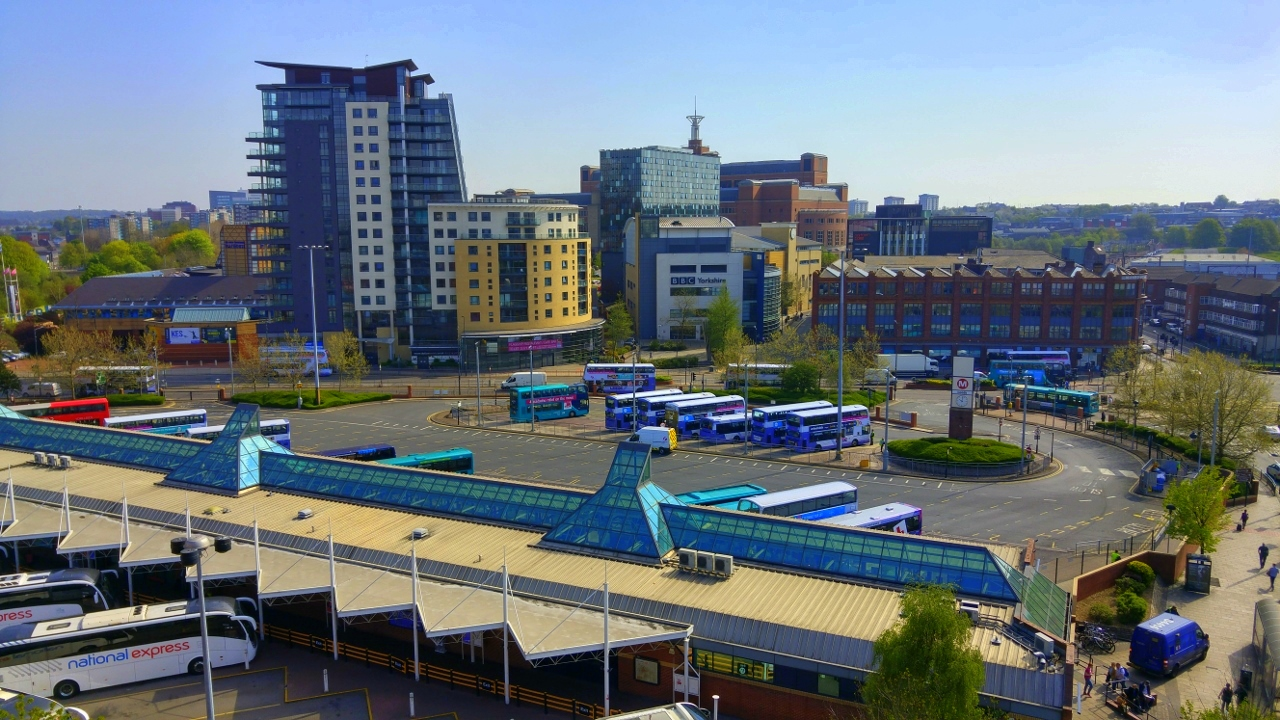
Overview in May 2016

The bus station was opened on 31 August 1938 as Leeds Central bus station. It was built at the same time and in the same style as the Quarry Hill flats. The original bus station was used as the back-drop for the opening credits of Yorkshire Television sitcom Queenie's Castle.

The station was rebuilt reopening on 30 September 1963 with four curved platforms. In 1990, Vicar Lane bus station closed and West Yorkshire Road Car Company buses began using the main bus station. It was again rebuilt, being officially reopened on 25 March 1996 when National Express relocated to the site. Wellington Street coach station was closed when the new station opened.

The bus station is 800 metres away from Leeds railway station meaning there is no central transport hub in Leeds. To answer this a small bus interchange was constructed at the railway station in 2005 and linked to the bus station by a FreeCityBus service, which was replaced by the LeedsCityBus service in April 2011.

== Architecture ==
The building replaced a series of steel and concrete bus shelters. In line with most new bus stations in West Yorkshire, Leeds City is fully enclosed. The building is a single-storey brick-built structure with a glass roof that runs the full length of the bus station, allowing the maximum use of natural light. There are two concourses within the station, the bus concourse is situated on the eastern side of the building with 25 bays, while the National Express concourse is situated on the western side with nine bays.

== Services ==
Arriva Yorkshire is the main service user of the bus station with services 110, 140, 140A, 141, 164, 200, 201, 202, 203, 229, 254, 255. These services cover areas including Huddersfield, Wakefield, Dewsbury and Batley

First West Yorkshire is the secondary user with services from First Leeds 23, 24, 27, 28, 33, 34, 62 and X84 covering areas including Headingley, Guiseley, Kirkstall and Otley

Along with this First Bradford have their intercity services 72 and X6 in the bus station these services cover Armley, Bramley, Pudsey and Thornbury

First Halifax terminate their 508 service here which covers Farsley, Thornbury and Odsal

Harrogate Bus Company and Keighley Bus Company, which are both subsidiaries of Transdev also use the bus station for their intercity services this being Keighley to Leeds 60 (Aireline) for Keighley Bus Company which covers Kirkstall, Shipley and Saltaire

For The Harrogate Bus Company these are the 7 which covers Wetherby, Boston Spa and Seacroft and 36 which covers Pannal, Harewood and Moortown

Along with this there are other smaller operators who use the station, Station Coaches, Connexions Buses and Yorkshire Buses

Yorkshire Coastliner also run long distance coastal services to Scarborough via Tadcaster, York and Malton from the bus station

The Flyer service A1 runs to Leeds Bradford Airport.

DalesBus services provide links to the Yorkshire Dales National Park on Sundays.

Megabus also run services with a variety of national destinations from Stand 1

National Express operates services from the western concourse to destinations across the country including London, Birmingham, Sheffield, Manchester and more
