= Allen/Medical Campus station =

Light rail station in Buffalo, New York

Allen/Medical Campus
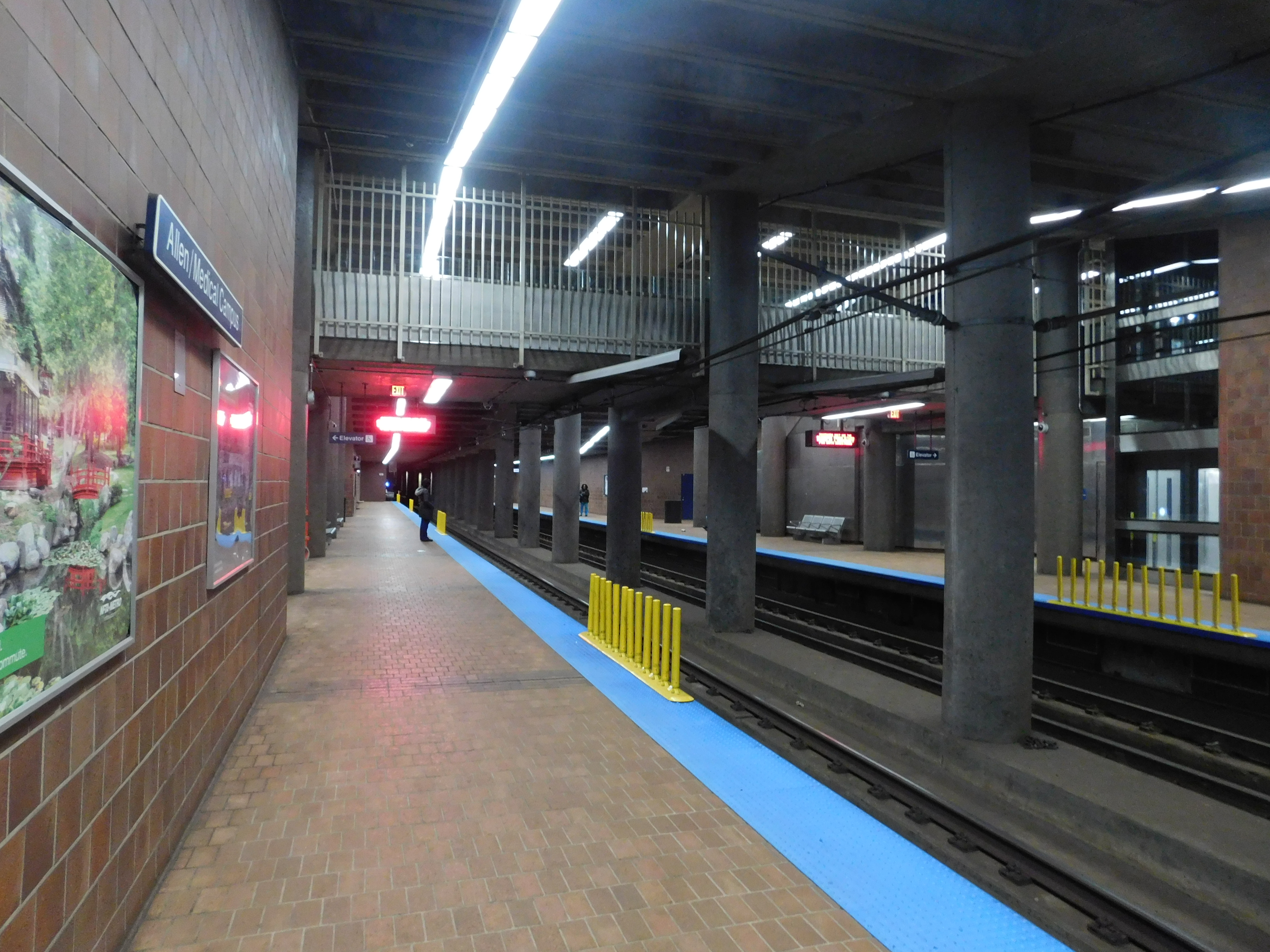
- Allen/Medical Campus station in November 2018.

General information
- Location: 929 Main Street; Buffalo, New York
- Coordinates: 42°53′57.75″N 78°52′10.30″W
- Owner: NFTA
- Platforms: 2 side platforms
- Tracks: 2

Construction
- Structure type: Underground
- Depth: 40 feet (12 m)

Other information
- Fare zone: Paid fare

History
- Opened: May 18, 1985; 41 years ago
- Former names: Allen–Hospital (May 18, 1985–September 1, 2003)

Passengers
- 2017: 343,796

Services
Preceding station	NFTA	Following station
Summer–Best toward University	Metro Rail	Fountain Plaza toward DL&W
Former services
Preceding station	NFTA	Following station
Summer–Best toward University	Metro Rail	Theater Closed 2013 toward DL&W
Location

Allen/Medical Campus station (formerly Allen–Hospital station until September 1, 2003) is a Buffalo Metro Rail station located at the corner of Main and Allen Streets at the northern end of Buffalo, New York's downtown and is the last underground station to the south requiring payment before entering the Free Fare Zone. The station was temporarily closed in 2015 to incorporate a new building at the University at Buffalo School of Medicine and Biomedical Sciences into the station's aboveground entrances (the building has since been completed).

== Bus connections ==
Allen/Medical Campus station is one of four stations that does not offer an off-road bus loop, requiring passengers to board/debark using curbside stops (the other three being Summer-Best, located 2,112 feet north, Humboldt-Hospital, located 11,616 feet north and Amherst Street, located 16,896 feet north). Route 7 buses heading downtown and route 8 buses heading toward Marine Drive do not board at the curb at the same side as the station, which is served by six bus routes:

- NFTA
  - 7 Baynes-Richmond
  - 8 Main
  - 29 Wohlers
  - 64 Lockport (inbound)
  - 66 Williamsville (outbound)
  - 67 Cleveland Hill (outbound)
- University at Buffalo shuttles
  - Blue Line - serves as a shuttle van to University at Buffalo-affiliated locations of the Buffalo Niagara Medical Campus from the University at Buffalo-South Campus.

== Artwork ==
In 1979, an art selection committee was created, composed of NFTA commissioners and Buffalo area art experts, that would judge the artwork that would be displayed in and on the properties of eight stations on the Metro Rail line. Out of the 70 proposals submitted, 22 were chosen and are currently positioned inside and outside of the eight underground stations. Allen/Medical Campus station is home of four pieces of work, from Richard Friedberg (New York City), Scott Burton (New York City); Charles Clough (New York City); and Alberto Cappas, Juan Gonzalez and Olga Mendell of the Latin Gallery (Buffalo). Richard Friedberg's offers an objective sculpture made of aluminum and steel. It is polychromed with highly durable paint and high gloss coloration. It is located on a wall over the escalator between the mezzanine and the level between the mezzanine and train platforms. Charles Clough offers riders a large photographic mural based on the work of Charles Burchfield, Buffalo's most famous painter. The Latin Gallery group offers riders a wall located along a sidewalk at the south end of the station in bright colors, and containing selected excerpts from chosen poetry. The work is on colored enamel fused to copper tile. Though subtle, Scott Burton offers riders a pair of bronze benches located in the middle of the mezzanine near the ticket vending machines. The two benches pay tribute to the American Arts and Crafts Movement. The benches represent uptown and downtown directions to the station. Each of the benches are life-sized and invite participation, by passengers sitting in them.

== Notable places nearby ==
Allen/Medical Campus station is located near:

- Allentown
- Anchor Bar
- Buffalo-Niagara Medical Campus
- Hauptman-Woodward Medical Research Institute

== Unusual operations ==
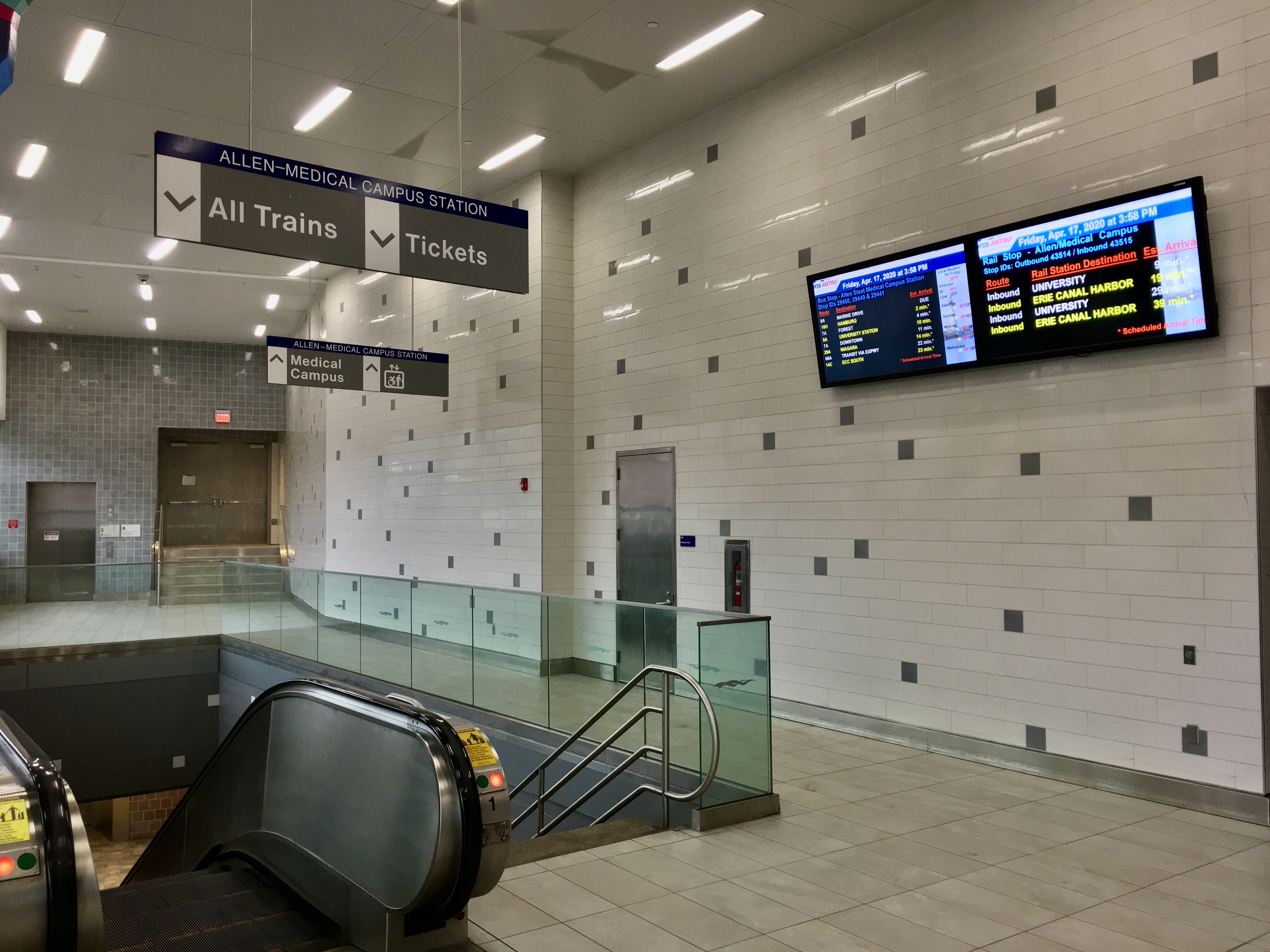
Interior of the renovated station, 2020

Since Allen/Medical Campus station serves as a terminal, immediately south is a double crossover. During the weekends of August 9–10, 2013 and July 18–20, 2014, due to construction of the 600 and 500 blocks, respectively, of Main Street to include vehicular traffic, Allen/Medical Campus station temporarily served as the southern terminus. As a result, NFTA-Metro offered shuttle buses to accommodate passengers between this station and Canalside station, with each shuttle running every 15 minutes. From February 16-March 16, 2015, April 20-May 18, 2015, June 6–7, 2015, June 13–14, 2015, June 26–27, 2015, August 22–23, 2015, September 8–25, 2015 and July 5, 2016, due to construction of the new University at Buffalo School of Medicine and Biomedical Sciences, Allen/Medical Campus station was temporarily closed. Passengers who wanted to access the Buffalo-Niagara Medical Campus were instructed to deboard the train at Summer-Best station, as it temporarily served as the southern terminus of the paid fare zone. As a result, NFTA-Metro offered shuttle buses to accommodate passengers to the Buffalo-Niagara Medical Campus, with each shuttle running every 10 minutes. From July 6-October 10, 2016, passengers with mobility devices who normally use Allen/Medical Campus station to access the Buffalo-Niagara Medical Campus were instructed to exit at Summer-Best station and board the #8 Main bus, as the Mezzanine-to-Street Level elevator was being replaced. From September 24-October 9, 2016, due to construction of the new University at Buffalo School of Medicine and Biomedical Sciences, Allen/Medical Campus station was temporarily closed. Passengers who wanted to access the Buffalo-Niagara Medical Campus were instructed to deboard the train at Summer-Best station, as it temporarily served as the southern terminus of the paid fare zone. As a result, NFTA-Metro offered shuttle buses to accommodate passengers to the Buffalo-Niagara Medical Campus, with each shuttle running every 12 minutes.

== See also ==
- List of Buffalo Metro Rail stations
