= Neal Du Brock =

Neal Du Brock directed the world-premieres of many important plays including Edward Albee's Box (play) and Lanford Wilson's Lemon Sky (starring Christopher Walken and Charles Durning).

He worked for many years at the Studio Theater and Studio Arena Theater in Buffalo, New York.

His name is sometimes spelled as Neal DuBrock. He was born Neal Lawrence Meek in California on August 6, 1923, and died on April 24, 1994, also in California.
