= Dewsbury bus station =

Bus station in West Yorkshire, England

Dewsbury
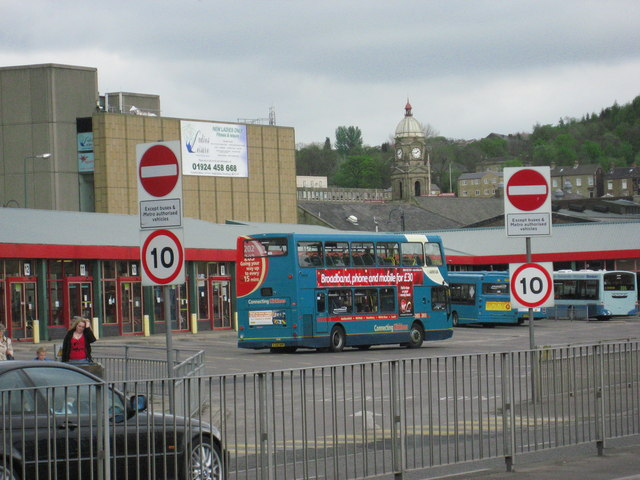

General information
- Location: Aldams Road, Dewsbury; Kirklees
- Coordinates: 53.690°N 1.631°W
- Operator: Metro (West Yorkshire PTE)
- Bus stands: 19
- Bus operators: Arriva Yorkshire; Longstaffs; National Express; Station Coaches
- Connections: Dewsbury railway station (330 yards [300 m])

Construction
- Parking: None
- Cycle facilities: Not Allowed inside
- Accessible: Yes

Other information
- Website: www.wymetro.com

History
- Opened: 1994
Location

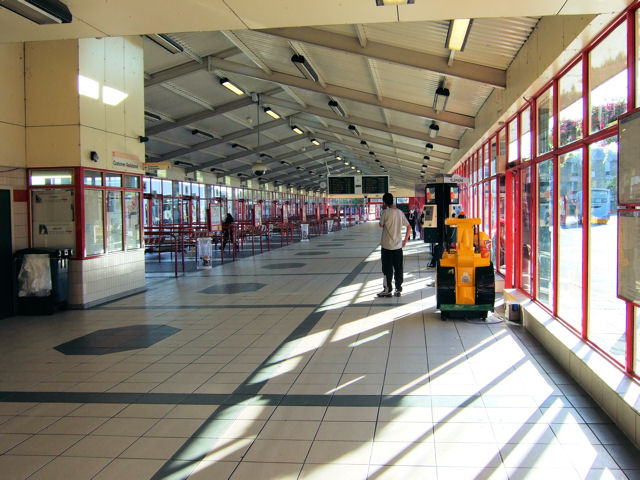
Inside Dewsbury bus station in August 2007

Dewsbury bus station serves the town of Dewsbury, West Yorkshire, England. The bus station is managed and owned by Metro (West Yorkshire PTE).

The bus station is situated in Dewsbury town centre next to Aldams Road (A638 road) and can be accessed there and from South Street. The bus station was rebuilt in 1994 with a main passenger concourse and 19 bus stands.

== History ==
The bus station opened in December 1994. It replaced an older bus station situated in Asman Square (now the Asman Centre), which operated from 1932 to 1980. In 2007, toilet facilities at the bus station were replaced. In 2021, artwork was installed on the wall of the bus station.

== Services ==
The main operator at Dewsbury Bus Station is Arriva Yorkshire, with other services provided by Yorkshire Tiger and Longstaffs. National Express coach services also run from here towards London. Buses run from Dewsbury around the Heavy Woollen District and run further afield as far as the main West Yorkshire towns and cities, Huddersfield, Halifax, Bradford, Leeds and Wakefield), as well as Brighouse, Elland and the White Rose Centre. Dewsbury's FreeTownBus service, run by Station Coaches, also link the bus station with the town centre, retail park and the railway station.

== Future ==
There are plans to refurbish the bus station. If the proposals go ahead, work would begin in 2022.
