= Buffalo Players (theatre company) =

The Buffalo Players were a community theater group operating in Buffalo, New York, from 1922 to 1926. Although only in operation for four years, they were connected with several prominent theater and film professionals, such as C. Pascal Franchot (later known as film actor Franchot Tone); Marian de Forest, founder of Zonta International and Buffalo civic leader; and Broadway and Hollywood actor Jerome Collamore.

They were also in part the inspiration for two other community theater groups: the Niagara Falls Little Theater (Now Niagara Regional Theatre Guild), which was founded in 1924, and the Rochester Community Players, continuously operating since 1925. Founding members also assisted in the launch of the Studio Theater School, predecessor of Buffalo's Studio Arena Theater.

== Organization ==
Marian de Forest was the president of the organization. She continued as a theater critic for the Buffalo Express even while serving as the head of the Buffalo Players. At a speech before the newly forming Niagara Falls Players Association on November 6, 1924, she described how, in the early days of the Buffalo organization, they only had 'hope and faith', and 'depended on charity.' She said they started looking for a suitable place two years earlier, examining barns, a brewery and churches, before coming on what she described as a "forlorn" Allendale theater, with aisle too narrow, seats too close together and decorations in very poor condition, and that by 1924 the theater was in 'fine style'.

The offices and rehearsal space of the Players was in an historic house at 334 Delaware Avenue, built in the 1860s and leased from the owner, Dr. Charles Cary. The house was located between the Cary home at 340 Delaware, and the home of Lawrence D. Rumsey at 330 Delaware.

Lars S. Potter was vice president of the organization and Pascal Franchot was secretary and speaker of the new organization.

The organization was publicly launched at a meeting at the Iroquois Hotel, Buffalo November 23, 1922, with Walter Hampden as the guest speaker and Buffalo Players President de Forest presiding.

The Players leased the Allendale Theater, starting January 1923 with an 18-month lease.

The Buffalo Players had reached membership of 2,560 by the opening of the 1924–25 season, according to Pascal Franchot. Going into the 1925–26 season, the Buffalo Players had a membership of nearly 2,600. In the summer of 1925, the Buffalo Players started putting out a newsletter called The Cue, and adopted a 'seal' or logo designed by Urquhart Wilcox: the skull of a buffalo inside a triangle.

== Productions ==
From available records, the following is a partial list of productions staged by the Buffalo Players:

=== 1922-23 Season ===
The first production presented by the organization was A Curious Mishap by Carlo Goldoni, opening January 24, 1923.

Second production: Three one act plays: The Dear Departed, by Stanley Houghton, Finders, Keepers by George Kelly, and Sham by Frank G. Compton; opening January 30, 1923.

Mrs. Bumpstead Leigh, by Harry J. Smith

Three one-act plays: Ile, by Eugene O'Neill, Behind the Beyond by Stephen Leacock, and Michael Angelo's Choice, by K. Parker Lewis

Three One act plays by Lord Dunsany: The Lost Silk Hat, The Tents of the Arabs, and The Queen's Enemies

The Torch Bearers by George Kelly

=== 1923-24 Season ===
Captain Applejack, by Walter Hackett

Truth About Blayds by A. R. Milne

The Missing Man, by Cosmo Hamilton, with sets designed by Urquhart Wilcox, February 7–16, 1924;

R.U.R., by Karel Capek; Pascal Franchot and Lars Potter were in the leading roles, March 14–27, 1924;

Seven Keys to Baldpate by George M. Cohan, April 24, 1924;

La Chave Sourls, in cooperation with the Junior League, May 12-??, 1924;

Adam and Eva, by George Middleton and Guy Bolton, with Eric Snowden in the lead and Lars Potter also in the cast, June 1924

=== 1924-25 Season ===
Dulcy, by George S. Kaufman and Marc Connelly, October 1924;

Fashion, written in 1844 by Anna Cora Mowatt December 1924

Anna Christie, Opening April 22, 1925

Outward Bound, with Lars Potter as Tom Pryor (Potter went on to Dallas to play this same role in a Dallas Players production of this play, after which the Buffalo Players hosted a guest production of No Count Boy by the Dallas organization on May 15 and 16, 1925)

Expressing Willie, by Rachel Crothers

H.M.S. Pinafore by Gilbert and Sullivan

Last production of the 1924–25 season: Three Live Ghosts by Frederic Isham in June 1925

=== 1925-26 Season ===
Manna, by Olga Printzlau

Which One?, by Edwin Mack

Sherlock Holmes by William Gillette and Arthur Conan Doyle December 1925

Androcles and the Lion, by George Bernard Shaw, opening January 25, 1926, with Lars S. Potter as Androcles

The Mikado, by Gilbert and Sullivan, opening February 15, 1926

The Climax, by Edward Lock, April 8–17, 1926

The final regular production of the Buffalo Players at the Allentown Playhouse was The Thief, by Henri Bernstein performed April 22 – May 7, 1926. According to a newspaper report, the production played to "standing room only" at the Playhouse, and traveled to East Aurora, NY.

=== 1926-27 Season ===
The remaining productions of the Buffalo Players were staged at an 'experimental playhouse' on the second floor of 545 Elmwood Avenue, Buffalo. The space has been operated most recently as "TheaterLoft" by the Ujima Company

"Wappin' Wharf" by Charles S. Brooks, opening at the Elmwood Avenue space December 16, 1926

A one-act children's play, Puck Plkays Christmas by Ethel C. Wilcox of Buffalo. The production intended for the Christmas Season, but opened January 18, 1927 due to the remodeling of the Elmwood Avenue space.

Three one-act plays: The Constant Lover by St. John Hankin; The Wonder Hat by Kenneth Sawyer Goodman and Ben Hecht, and Dnger, by Richard Hughes.

Dear Brutus by J. M. Barrie, opening March 28, 1927 This was the last production staged by the Buffalo Players.

== Managing Directors ==
Frederick Kitson Cowley was the first 'Art Director' (artistic or managing director) of the Buffalo Players. Cowley had attended the Art Institute of Chicago. He was an illustrator who had taught at the University of Illinois, the University of Minnesota and the Carnegie Institute of Technology. He had fifteen years of experience prior to coming to the Buffalo Players, and had directed soldoers' plays in France and Italy as part of the World War I American Expeditionary Force. At the organization's first public meeting, Crowley stated that the theater was at its highest development in the age of William Shakespeare, Richard Burbage, and Edward Alleyn, and that contemporary theater was over-commercialized and controlled by people not primarily interested in theater as an art. The purpose of groups like the Buffalo Players was to foster a love for theater of artistic value. "Our community theater will be to all intents in the hands of the actors. It is better to have freedom of motion in the theaters with amateurs thaan to have ever-so-capable actors dominated by those who know little and care less for the art of the stage."

Eric Seton Snowden, of California, was engaged as the director of the Buffalo Players in July, 1923. Snowden believed in popular entertainment. "I am extremely weary of uplifting drama. It simply isn't being done anymore, either. Out in Pasadina [the Pasadena Playhouse, California], where I spent part of the summer, the Community theater there had achieved a howling success with such offerings as Potash and Perlmutter. The little theaterite is finding out that he can't take himself too seriously, or he will be laughed out of court. The community theater, if it is to continue to function.. . must take off its high heeled boots and tread like folks. The high brow ideal that use to be obtained doesn't mix with box office receipts, and for an unsubsidized theater such as we have here at the present time, the latter has just got to be considered. The primary objective of any theater, for that matter, is to entertain; and nothing that is deadly dull, as uplift productions mostly are, can either function or endure."

Broadway and Hollywood actor Jerome Collamore was named to succeed Mr. Snowden in August 1925. In a newspaper interview, he stated that "the drama is the greatest force of good there is. . . it is better than the pulpet, since the play is that medium of education which appeals to the emotions." In speaking of the Buffalo Players, and community theater in general, "Yours is a splendid spirit, since you are feeling out constantly for new talent, new material. Therein lies your opportunity. You can do the unusual. You are not limited to the things to which the commercial theater is limited. The true spirit in a community theater is that which allows for growth, which visualizes the future of American drama." Mr. Collamore was released at the end of the 1925–26 season.

The final professional director of the Buffalo Players, for the 1926–27 season, was Harold P. Preston. He stated that "The Buffalo Players will, this season, produce only plays which we believe significant. But this does not mean that our productions will be uninteresting. Quite the contrary. There is an 'all too general impression that art, and especially dramatic art, is stodgy dull, tragic. Nothing is farther from the truth. Some of the merriest of plays are artistic. Most significant plays are interesting, not alone for the problem they may solve or present, but likewise because they aie well written, dramatic plays. The Buffalo Players will not, however, make even a slight obeisance in the direction of the box office. We will be only too happy to have large audiences. But we want audiences who come to us because the wish to see the fine things of the theatre, done with sincerity and understanding. We want audiences who want the sort of plays and productions which will make Buffalo take its place among the cities of the United States interested in, and fostering, the worth while in dramatic art."

== End of Operations ==
Dissension over the direction of the program reached the newspapers in April 1926. Jessie Bonstelle, a former Buffalo stock producer and actress, had been quoted as saying, in regard to little theaters, "these groups invariably become cliques and snobbishness develops, offsetting whatever possibilities the Little Theater might have for good." In response, Sibylla Schiling, a cast member in the production of The Climax, replied "The Little Theater movement tends, particularly in the stance of the Buffalo Players where everyone who is interested may come in and take part, to discourage snobbishness."

In the spring of 1926, a competing community theater organization first presented a production in Buffalo, the Volday Players. According to a newspaper account, "the members of the cast are. . . familiar to Buffaloians through their appearance in Buffalo Players' performances."

At the conclusion of the 1925–26 season, the group apparently intended to change their production policy, from being a 'community theater' emphasizing popular theatrical fare, to a 'Little Theater', concentrating on more artistic production. According to one newspaper analysis, being a 'little theater' was the original idea of the group, and they were considering relocation to "a pleasant old barn", which would be turned into an intimate 300-seat theater.

People associated with the Volday Players filed incorporation papers for the Buffalo Little Theater Guild, Inc. in the summer or fall of 1926. A newspaper report characterized the move as "a definite split in the ranks of the Buffalo Players" and listed supporters of the new Guild as including Howard L. Volgeneau (President of the new group), George H. Richardson, Julius H. Potter, Kevin O'Callahan, and Myron C. Dulvany. The newspaper report stated that Lars S. Potter and the Buffalo Players was surprised by the incorporation, but that it would have no effect on the plans for their upcoming season. The report described those plans as following: "The Buffalo Players at the present time are raising funds for the acquisition of a theater of their own in which to produce their plays. Up until last spring the Playhouse in Allen Street was leased to them, but with the close of the 1925-26 season the Playhouse was turned back to its owners, who have reestablished it as a motion picture house. Jerome Collamore, producing director of the Buffalo Players, was released with the presentation of the final play, The Thief. Since then various rumors with respect to the directorship plans have been afloat."

In the summer of 1926, the Buffalo Players had a decision to make: whether to continue as a community theater program, with popular entertainment at a large playhouse and the need to raise $40,000 per year, or to convert to a strict "Little Theater", with a small performance space, concentrating on productions perceived to be of artistic merit, and avowedly with no concern for box office receipts. As shown by the quote from Mr. Preston, cited above, the Buffalo Players chose to go the Little Theater route.

A year later, in the summer of 1927, the Buffalo Players operation, including its assets, performance space and "good-will", was merged into the Studio School of the Theater, operated by Jane Keeler and Sheldon Viele. This is considered the origins of the Studio Arena Theater). A letter was sent by the officers of the Buffalo Players to the membership in July, 1927, announcing this merger. Performances and classes for the Studio School were held in the Buffalo Players former space on the corner of Elmwood Avenue and Anderson Place. Keeler directed the Studio Theater School until 1958, and died in 1974 at age 94.

== Inspiration to other theaters ==
=== Niagara Little Theater ===
Marian de Forest, as president of the Buffalo Players, wrote to 'leading citizens' of Niagara Falls in early 1924, inviting them to an organizational meeting of the Niagara Falls Little Theater, a community theater organization, on February 6 at the Chamber of Commerce. The invitation stated "the proposed organization will be patterned after the Players association of Buffalo and similar institutions in other cities..." Ms. de Forest spoke on the history and experience of the Buffalo Players at the meeting (this is the meeting described in "organization", above). Niagara Falls launched its program with a production of Wedding Bells, by Salisbury Field, in May 1924. The director of the play was Fred Kitson Cowley, the first director of the Buffalo Players. Crowley remained director of the group until 1927 The chairman of the new organization was Edward ("Ned") Franchot, cousin of Pascal Franchot, founding member of the Buffalo Players. Edward Franchot was a member of the cast of the first Buffalo Players production, The Curious Mishap.

=== Rochester Community Players ===
The first organizational luncheon of the Rochester Community Players was held at the Sagamore Hotel, Rochester NY, in October 1923, and Pascal Franchot, representing the Buffalo Players, was the principal speaker.

In December 1924, the Buffalo Players took their production of Fashion to Rochester, NY as an example to the newly formed Rochester Community Players as to what a community theater was capable of producing. The Rochester organization commenced its own program January 19, 1925 with a production Wedding Bells, by Salisbury Field (the same play that opened the Niagara Falls program eight months earlier.)
