= Humboldt–Hospital station =

Light rail station in Buffalo, New York

Humboldt–Hospital
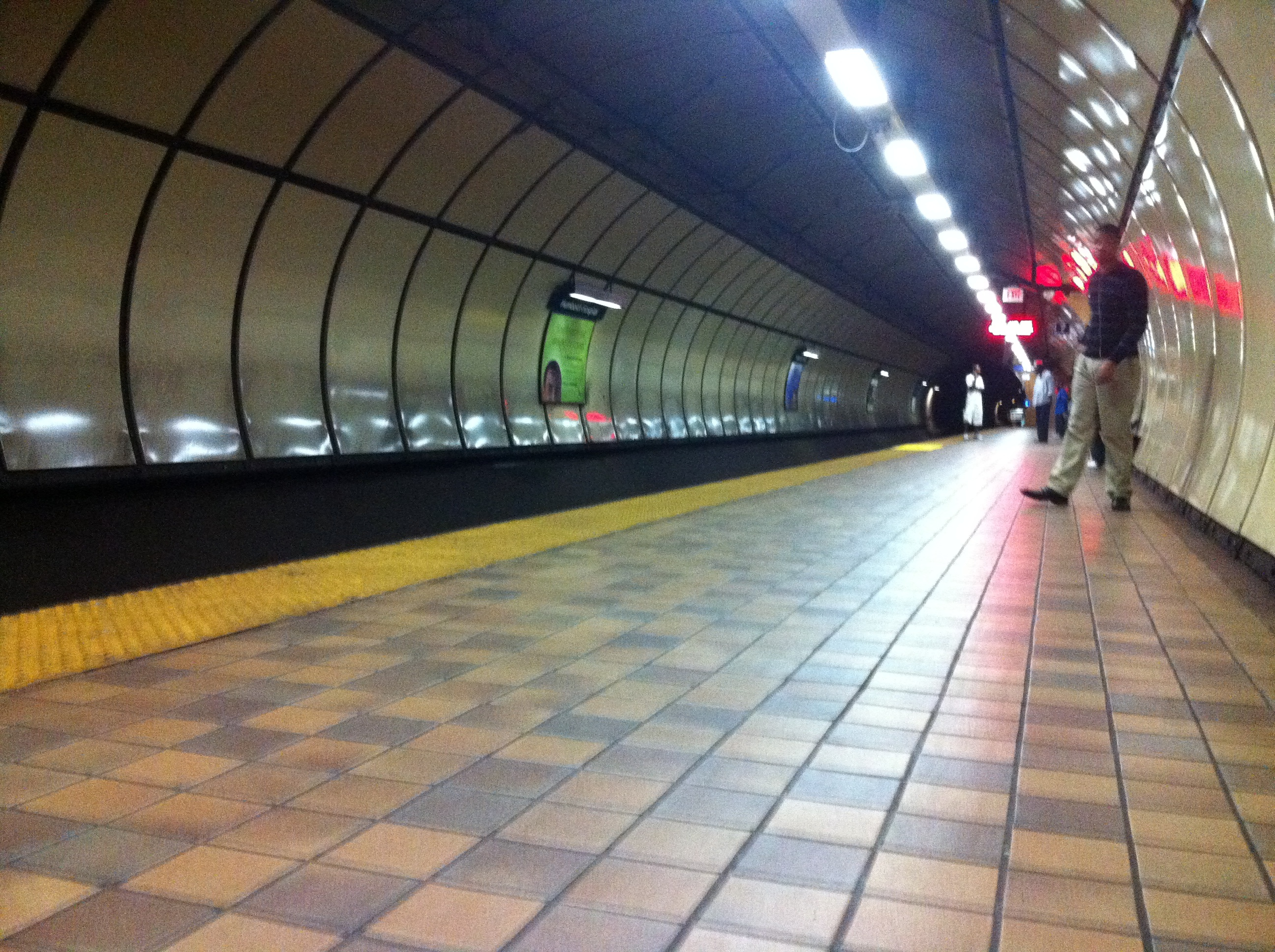
- Humboldt–Hospital station's outbound platform

General information
- Location: 2040 Main Street; Buffalo, New York
- Coordinates: 42°55′39″N 78°51′06″W
- Owner: NFTA
- Platforms: 1 island platform
- Tracks: 2

Construction
- Structure type: Underground
- Depth: 75 feet (23 m)

Other information
- Fare zone: Paid fare

History
- Opened: May 18, 1985; 41 years ago

Passengers
- 2017: 163,741

Services
Preceding station	NFTA	Following station
Amherst Street toward University	Metro Rail	Delavan/Canisius College toward DL&W
Location

Humboldt–Hospital station is a Buffalo Metro Rail station located at the western terminus of Kensington Avenue and Main Street and is the only station with entrances on both sides of Main Street for passengers to enter and exit from. To not confuse, Kensington Avenue rejoins Main Street in Snyder, New York at its eastern terminus. Since Humboldt–Hospital station served as a terminal due to Amherst Street station serving as the northern terminus from May 20, 1985, to November 10, 1986, about 580 feet north is a double crossover. The area near the station is a mix of housing and medical offices, anchored by the Sisters of Charity Hospital. The Parkside residential community is directly to the east of the station and is also a short distance from Delaware Park.

== Bus connections ==
Humboldt–Hospital station is one of four stations that does not offer an off-road bus loop, requiring passengers to board/debark using curbside stops (the other three being Amherst Street, Summer–Best and Allen/Medical Campus) and one of only two that has one route serving the station (the other being LaSalle):

- 8 Main

== Artwork ==
In 1979, an art selection committee was created, composed of NFTA commissioners and Buffalo area art experts, that would judge the artwork that would be displayed in and on the properties of eight stations on the Metro Rail line. Out of the 70 proposals submitted, 22 were chosen and are currently positioned inside and outside of the eight underground stations. Humboldt–Hospital station is home of two pieces of work in the upper level, from Sharon Gold and Joyce Kozloff (New York City). The artwork in the form of photography on the platform level is by Milton Rogovin.

== Notable places nearby ==
Humboldt–Hospital station is near:

- Canisius College
- Darwin Martin House
- Delaware Park
- Medaille College (closed in 2023)
- Sisters of Charity Hospital (Catholic Health System)
- St. Mary's School for the Deaf
