= Summer–Best station =

Light rail station in Buffalo, New York

Summer–Best
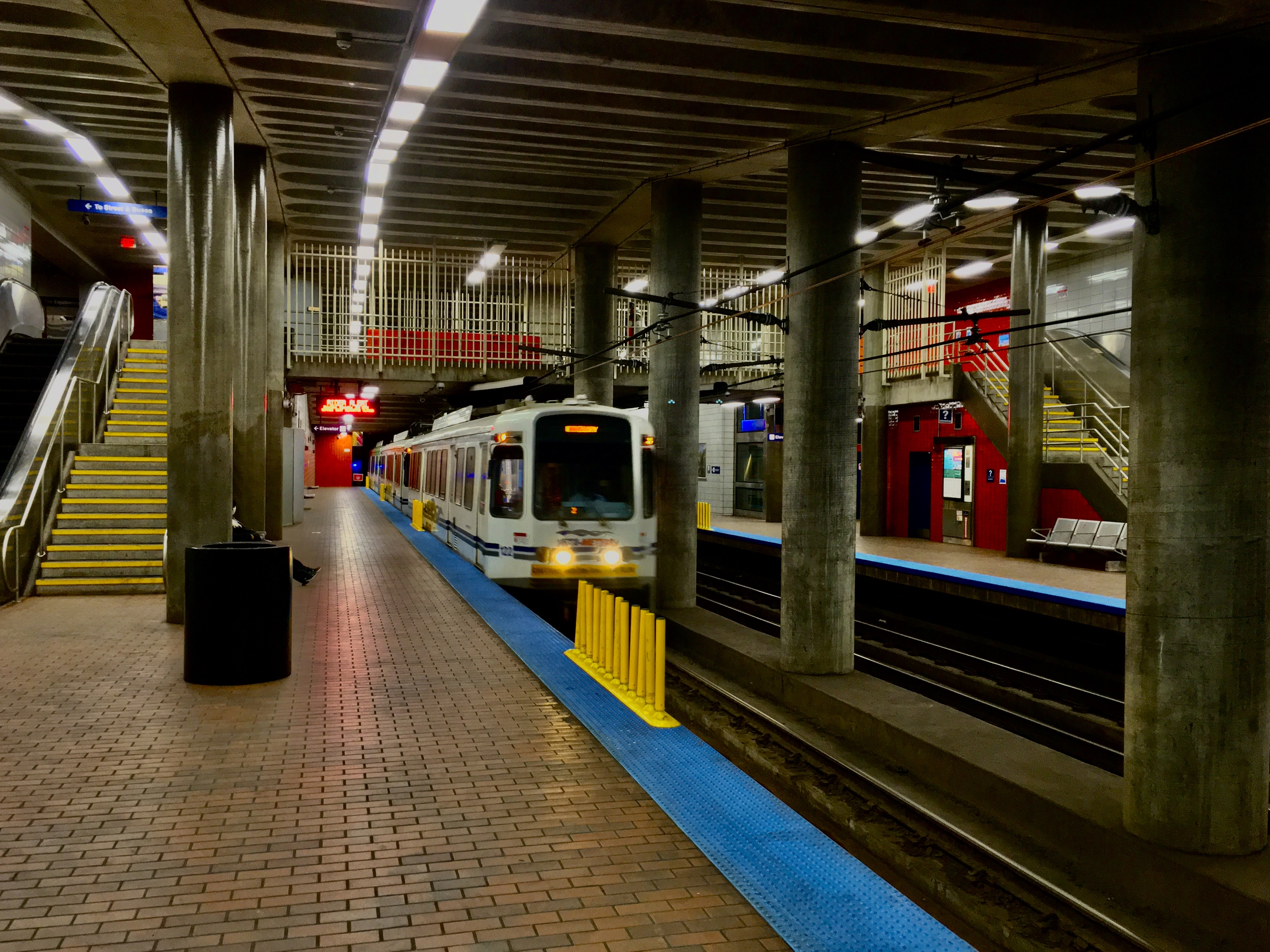
- Summer–Best station in 2021

General information
- Location: 1145 Main Street; Buffalo, New York
- Coordinates: 42°54′17″N 78°52′04″W
- Owner: NFTA
- Platforms: 2 side platforms
- Tracks: 2

Construction
- Structure type: Underground
- Depth: 40 feet (12 m)

Other information
- Fare zone: Paid fare

History
- Opened: May 18, 1985; 41 years ago

Passengers
- 2017: 234,434

Services
| Preceding station | NFTA | Following station |
|---|---|---|
| Utica toward University | Metro Rail | Allen/Medical Campus toward DL&W |
Location

Summer–Best station is a Buffalo Metro Rail station located at the junction of Summer, Best and Main Streets.

== Bus connections ==
Summer–Best station is one of four stations that does not offer an off-road bus loop, requiring passengers to board/debark using curbside stops (the other three being Amherst Street, Humboldt–Hospital and Allen/Medical Campus). Route 8 buses heading toward Marine Drive or University station and route 22 buses heading toward Thruway Mall do not board at the curb on the same side as the station, which is served by two bus routes:

- 8 Main
- 22 Porter–Best

== Artwork ==
In 1979, an art selection committee was created, composed of NFTA commissioners and Buffalo area art experts, that would judge the artwork that would be displayed in and on the properties of eight stations on the Metro Rail line. Out of the 70 proposals submitted, 22 were chosen and are currently positioned inside and outside of the eight underground stations. Summer–Best station is home of two pieces of work, from George Sugarman (New York City) and John Pfahl (Buffalo).

== Notable places nearby ==
Summer–Best station is located near:

- Anchor Bar
- Allentown
- City Honors School
- Theodore Roosevelt Inaugural National Historic Site

== Unusual operations ==
From February 16–March 16, 2015, April 20–May 18, 2015, June 6–7, 2015, June 13–14, 2015, June 26–27, 2015, August 22–23, 2015, September 8–25, 2015 and July 5, 2016, due to construction of the new School of Medicine and Biomedical Sciences that is slated to open in the summer of 2017, Allen/Medical Campus station was temporarily closed. Passengers who wanted to access the Buffalo–Niagara Medical Campus were instructed to deboard the train at Summer–Best station, as it temporarily served as the southern terminus of the paid fare zone. NFTA–Metro provided shuttle buses running every 10 minutes.

From July 6–October 10, 2016, passengers with mobility devices who normally use Allen/Medical Campus station to access the Buffalo–Niagara Medical Campus were instructed to exit at Summer–Best station and board the #8 Main bus, as the Mezzanine–to–Street Level elevator was being replaced.

From September 24–October 9, 2016, due to construction of the new University at Buffalo School of Medicine and Biomedical Sciences, Allen/Medical Campus station was temporarily closed. Passengers who wanted to access the Buffalo–Niagara Medical Campus were instructed to deboard the train at Summer–Best station, as it temporarily served as the southern terminus of the paid fare zone. As a result, NFTA–Metro offered shuttle buses to accommodate passengers to the Buffalo–Niagara Medical Campus, with each shuttle running every 12 minutes.

== See also ==
- List of Buffalo Metro Rail stations
