= Shea's 710 Theatre =

Theater in Buffalo, New York

Coordinates: 42.893219°N 78.872571°W

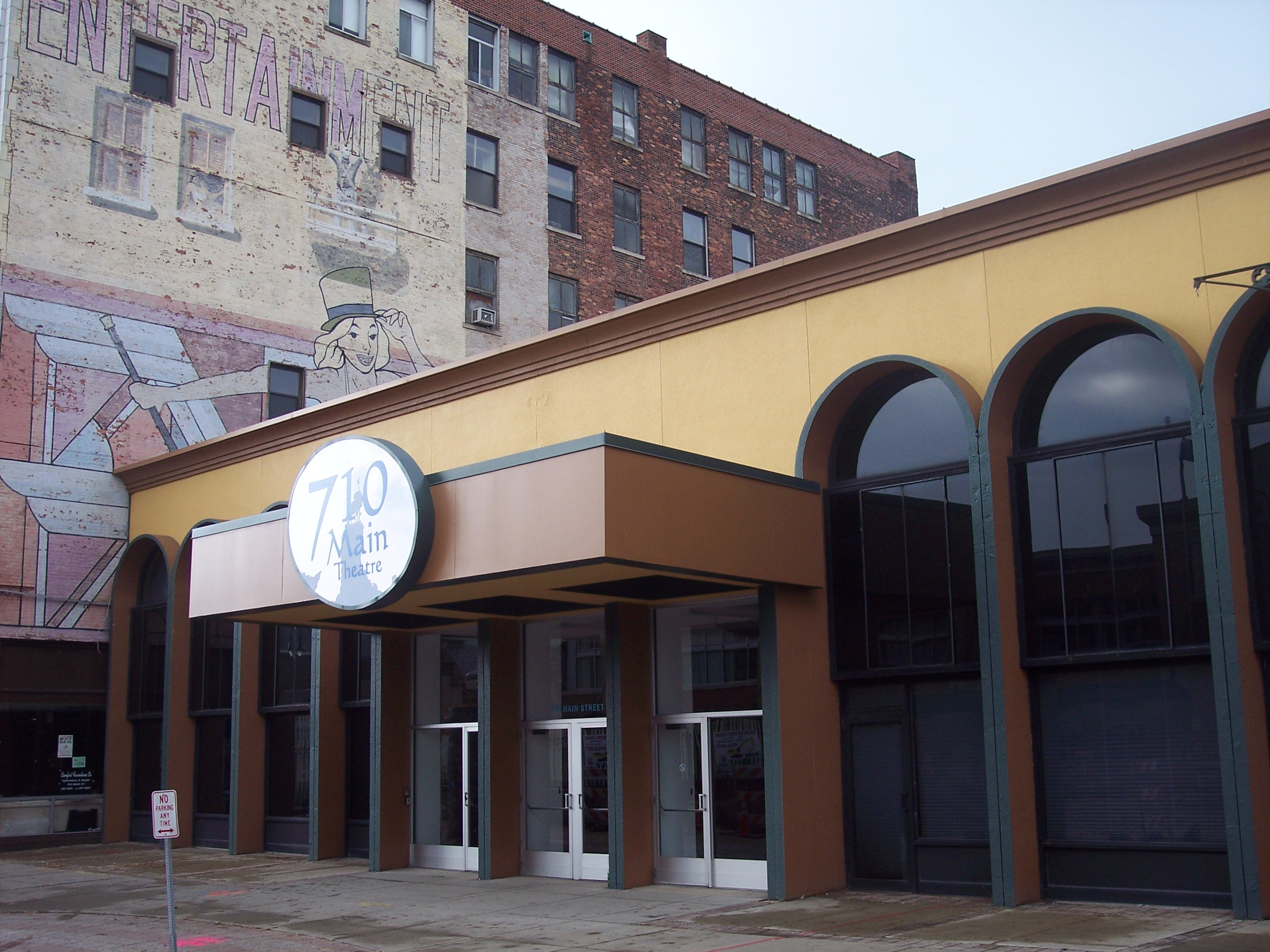
- Exterior view of theatre (c.2012)
- Interactive map of Shea's 710 Theatre
- Former names: Studio Arena Theatre (1920-2008); 710 Main Theatre (2012-16)
- Address: 710 Main St; Buffalo, NY 14202-1915
- Location: Downtown Buffalo
- Owner: City of Buffalo
- Capacity: 625

Construction
- Opened: 1927
- Closed: 2008
- Reopened: 2012

The Shea's 710 Theatre (originally known as the Studio Arena Theatre) is a theatre in Buffalo, New York. It was founded in the 1920s and briefly closed in 2008, citing $3 million in debt and laying off its staff. It was reopened as the 710 Main Theatre in 2012 and is managed by Shea's Performing Arts Center.

== History ==
Founded in the 1920s in Buffalo by a group of local enthusiasts including the Buffalo Players, the Studio Theatre evolved as both a theatre and a theatre school into Western New York's only professional regional theatre.

In 1927, Jane Keeler, a teacher of speech and drama, and Lars Potter, President of the Buffalo Players, and others established the Studio Theatre School. Performances and classes were located in a second floor lodge meeting hall on the corner of Elmwood Avenue and Anderson Place.

In 1934, Studio Theatre moved to a concert hall on the second floor of the Teck Theatre, until that building was converted to a movie house three years later. Studio Theatre School was incorporated with the playhouse as an educational institution in 1936 under the New York State Board of Regents. In 1937, having purchased the former Universalist Church at 305 Lafayette, the Studio Theatre was at home there for many years. In the early 1960s, the resident theatre movement was beginning, and Studio Theatre began its evolution into a professional Equity theatre under the leadership of Neal Du Brock. In a mere forty-day transformation, the former Town Casino (an important local nightclub) at 681 Main Street was transformed into the Buffalo's only not-for-profit professional regional theatre and was renamed Studio Arena Theatre in 1965. Studio Arena Theatre was a key player in the resident theater movement. Eventually it moved across the street into the former Palace Burlesque Theater at 710 Main Street in 1978 and became the cornerstone of the Buffalo Theatre District.

Until its demise as The Studio Arena Theatre, it had claim to being one of the oldest resident theaters in the United States. It was particularly supported over the years by Welles V. Moot.

Over the years it has produced many notable plays and world premieres including work by Edward Albee, A. R. Gurney, and Lanford Wilson. Studio Arena Theatre was the springboard for the careers of some of today's biggest Equity actors, including Emmy and Tony Award winners. Studio Arena Theatre was one of the country's premier regional theatres.

Studio Arena Theatre was shuttered after failing to reorganize under Chapter 11. On March 17, 2011, the Buffalo News reported that the nearby Shea's Performing Arts Center was trying to get the needed financing so that it can return the 626-seat theater to use for theatrical and non theatrical events. Shea's assumed ownership of the theater, which was renamed the 710 Main Theater after its address, at the beginning of the 2012–13 season. Live theater has resumed in the theatre. In 2016, Shea's tweaked the title to the Shea's 710 Theater as a form of cross-branding with its parent venue.

In 2019, Shea's 710 Theater became home to Starring Buffalo, which brought notable Broadway actors to the venue for the first time since the Studio Arena days. Under the leadership of Artistic Director Drew Fornarola, the series has featured Tony Award winners Matt Doyle and Lena Hall, Tony nominees Sidney DuPont and Josh Young, American Idol's Alyssa Wray, among others. To date, nearly 500 Western New York professional and student actors, dancers and musicians have performed in community art projects.

== Notable performers ==
Among the notable actors who have performed during the Studio Arena era over the years are

- F. Murray Abraham in Scuba Duba 1971
- Christine Baranski in Hedda Gabler 1987–88
- Kathy Bates in Semmelweiss 1977–78
- Michael Bradshaw in "Oh, Kay!" 1967
- Betty Buckley in A Very Private Life 1976–77, Buffalo Gal 2001–02
- Glenn Close in The Crucifer of Blood 1977–78
- Robert Costley in A Raisin in the Sun 1962
- Colleen Dewhurst in A Moon for the Misbegotten 1965
- Olympia Dukakis in The Rose Tattoo 1965–66
- Bonnie Franklin in Peter Pan 1972–73
- John Goodman in Lady of the Diamond 1980–81
- George Grizzard in Cyrano de Bergerac 1966–67
- Kelsey Grammer in Arms and the Man 1983–84
- Celeste Holm in Mama 1971–72
- Kim Hunter in Elizabeth the Queen 1976-77
- Richard Kline in Don't Talk to the Actors 2007–08
- Swoosie Kurtz in Other Voices, Other Rooms 1973–74
- Nancy Marchand in Children 1990–91
- Eve McVeagh in Scuba Duba 1971
- Julianne Moore in The Dresser 1983–84
- Betsy Palmer in A Doll's House 1975–76
- Ving Rhames in Wait Until Dark 1983–84
- Roy Scheider in Cyrano de Bergerac 1966
- John Schuck in Harvey 1994–95
- Jon Voight in A Streetcar Named Desire 1973–74
- Christopher Walken in Lemon Sky 1969–70
- M. Emmet Walsh in Cyrano de Bergerac 1966
- Paxton Whitehead in Springtime for Henry 1996–97
- James Whitmore in Last Love 1989-90
