= LeedsCityBus =

Bus service in Leeds, West Yorkshire, England

Metro Connect LeedsCityBus
- Parent: West Yorkshire Metro
- Founded: April 2011
- Headquarters: Leeds, West Yorkshire
- Service area: West Yorkshire
- Stops: Halton Moor, Leeds City Centre, LGI
- Destinations: Leeds
- Operator: First West Yorkshire
- Website: LeedsCityBus page (wymetro.com)

LeedsCityBus was a bus service which operated in the city centre of Leeds, West Yorkshire, England. The service started in 2011, as a replacement for the Leeds FreeCityBus service, which runs in other towns and cities in West Yorkshire. The service ran under contract to West Yorkshire Metro.

== History ==
The Leeds FreeCityBus service began on 30 January 2006 and was the first zero-fare bus service in West Yorkshire, this was followed by similar services in Huddersfield, Wakefield, Bradford and Dewsbury. The services are designed to link passengers to the bus and railway stations, shops and other locations.

In February 2011, the Leeds FreeCityBus came under threat of withdrawal, due to increased running costs. West Yorkshire Integrated Transport Authority (WYITA) and Metro decided to look at alternative ways of keeping a service in Leeds, as the service was popular with passengers, with over 7.5 million passengers using the service in the first five years of service, with the option of a small charge for passengers using the service being explored. On 25 March 2011, Metro and WYITA announced after a meeting that the FreeCityBus service in Leeds would be replaced by LeedsCityBus, with a 50p charge for a single journey. To soften the blow, Metro announced that passengers who had valid day or season tickets from Metro, First or other operators would be able to use the service for free, along with anyone who had an English National Concessionary Pass. The LeedsCityBus service started a week later, on 1 April 2011. The service ran on a fleet of six buses which were provided by Metro and was operated by First West Yorkshire. On 20 February 2016, Metro announced that the route was to become part of route 5 and a new service 15 would operate some parts of route 5.

== Route ==
The service ran in a circle, linking key nodes in the city centre, serving the bus, coach and railway stations, the town hall, Leeds General Infirmary plus the nearby dental and maternity hospitals, the two main universities in the city, University of Leeds and Leeds Metropolitan University, plus the many shops and markets in the city:

== See also ==
- Transport in Leeds
