= Amherst Street station =

Light rail station in Buffalo, New York

Amherst Street
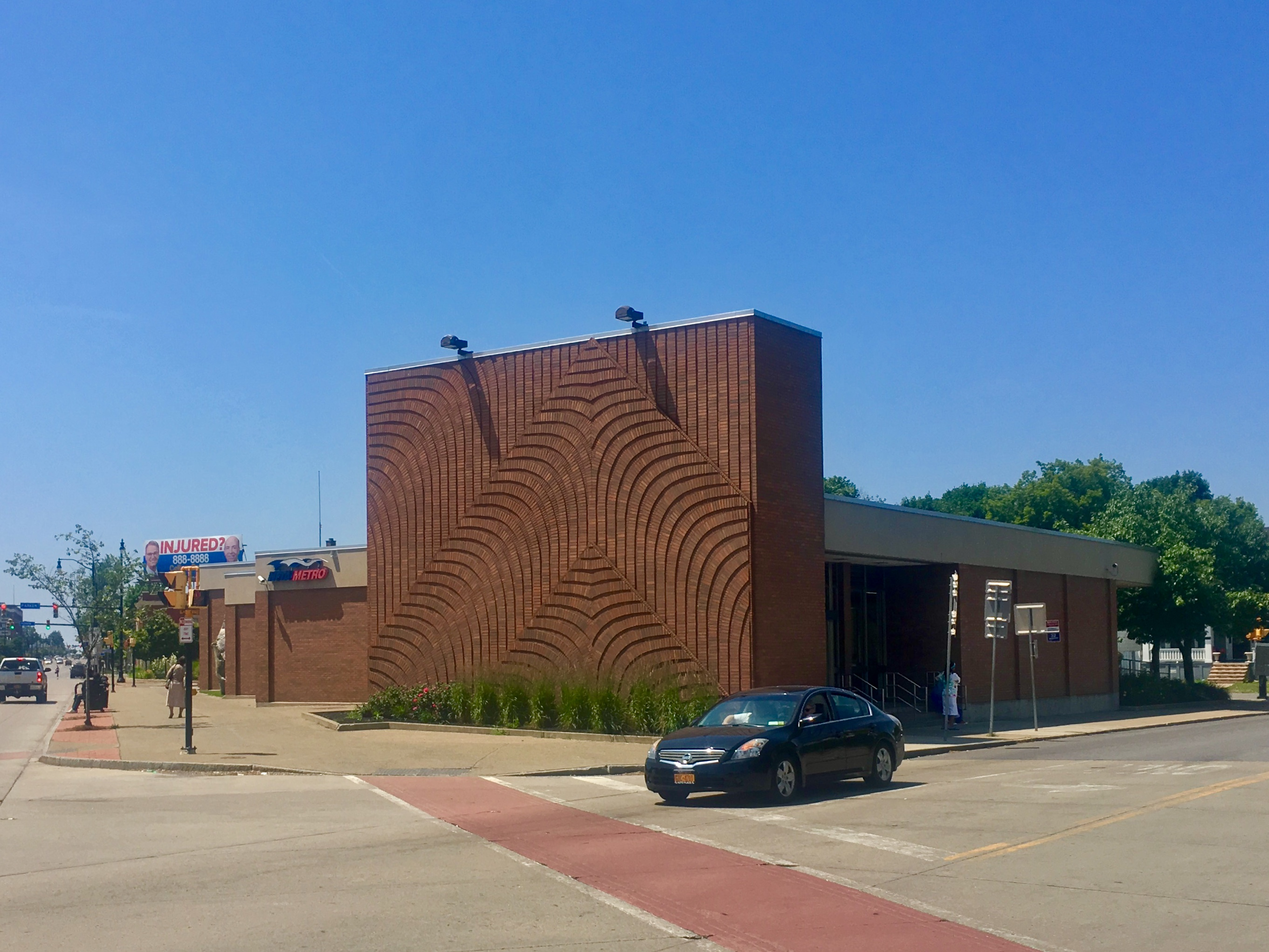
- Amherst Street station viewed from southwest corner of Main and Amherst Streets in July 2019

General information
- Location: 2666 Main Street; Buffalo, New York
- Coordinates: 42°56′24″N 78°50′19″W
- Owner: NFTA
- Platforms: 1 island platform
- Tracks: 2

Construction
- Structure type: Underground
- Depth: 40 feet (12 m)

Other information
- Fare zone: Paid fare

History
- Opened: May 18, 1985; 41 years ago

Passengers
- 2017: 332,316

Services
Preceding station	NFTA	Following station
LaSalle toward University	Metro Rail	Humboldt–Hospital toward DL&W
Location

Amherst Street station is a Buffalo Metro Rail underground station located at the corner of Main and Amherst Streets. From May 18, 1985 to November 10, 1986, due to construction issues at LaSalle station, Amherst Street station served as the northern terminus. The station has been referenced by rapper Westside Gunn numerous times.

== Bus connections ==
Located on a triangular tract of land bounded by Main Street to the east, Amherst Street to the north and Parker Avenue to the west, Amherst Street station is one of four stations that does not offer an off-road bus loop, requiring passengers to board/debark using curbside stops (the other three being Humboldt–Hospital, Summer–Best and Allen/Medical Campus). When the station opened in May 1985, bus routes were modified to stop on one of the three sides of the station. Route 23 buses heading toward Bailey/Abbott Loop and route 32 buses heading towards Black Rock/Riverside Transit Hub do not board at the curb on the same side as the station, which is served by three bus routes:

- 8 Main
- 23 Fillmore-Hertel
- 32 Amherst

== Artwork ==
In 1979, an art selection committee was created, composed of NFTA commissioners and Buffalo area art experts, that would judge the artwork that would be displayed in and on the properties of eight stations on the Metro Rail line. Out of the 70 proposals submitted, 22 were chosen and are currently positioned inside and outside of the eight underground stations. Amherst station is home of three pieces of work, from Aleksandra Kasuba (New York City), Ray Hassard (Buffalo) and Robert Lawrance Lobe (New York City).

== Notable places nearby ==
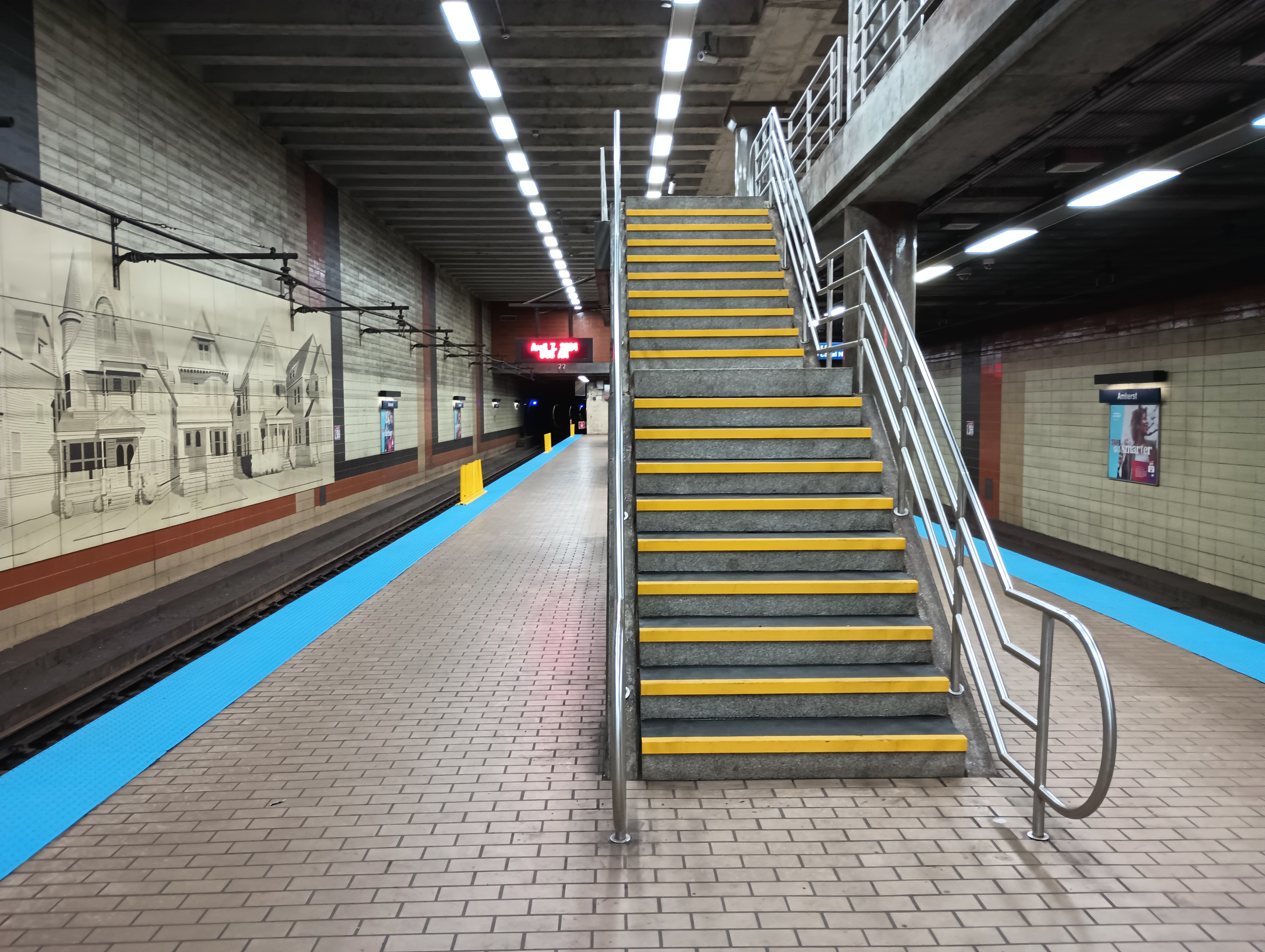
Amherst Street station's outbound platform in April 2024

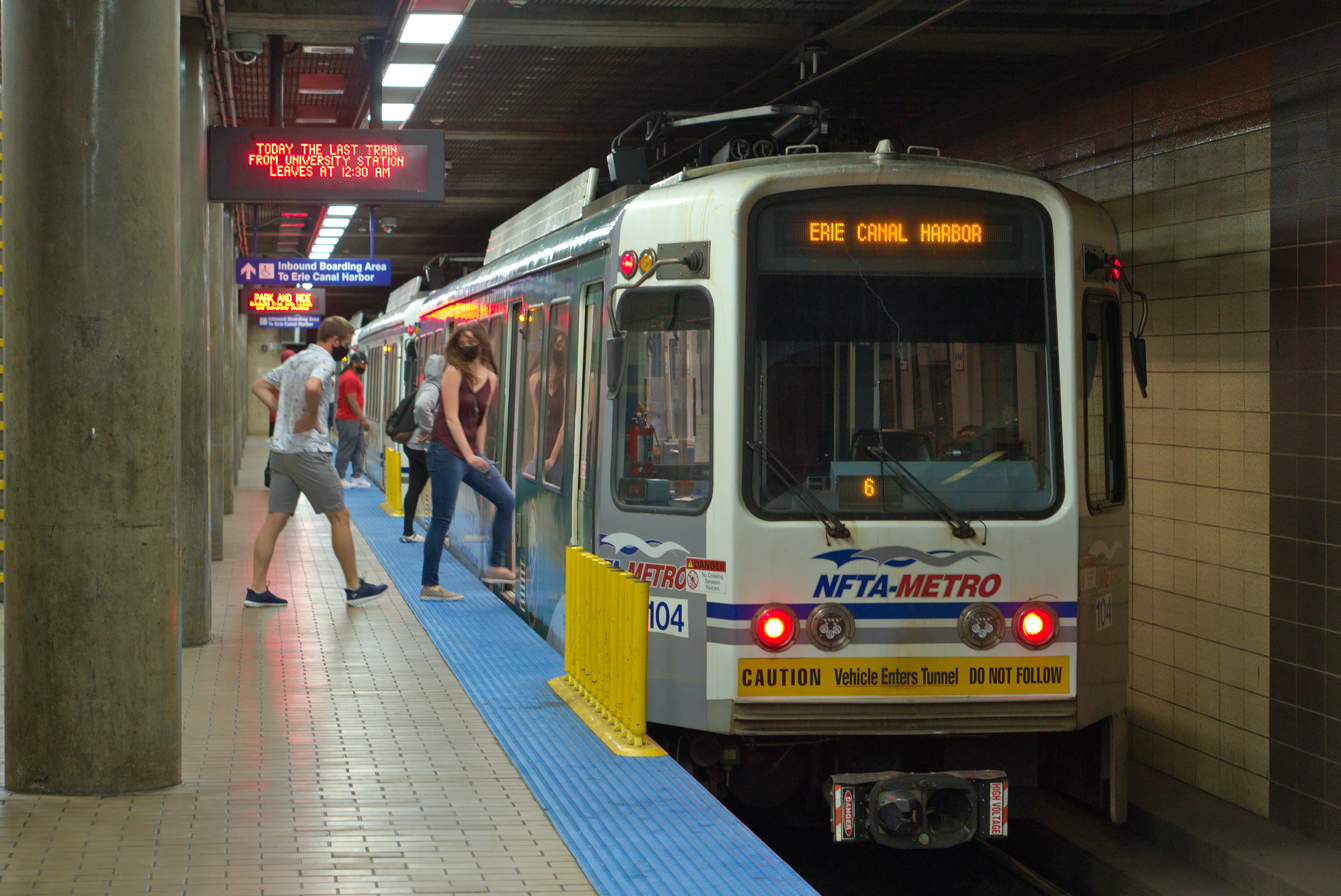
A light rail vehicle preparing to depart for Erie Canal Harbor station

Amherst Street Station is near:

- All-High Stadium
- Bennett High School
- Buffalo Zoological Gardens
- Delaware Park
- Central Park Neighborhood
- Darwin D. Martin House Complex (Frank Lloyd Wright)
- Delaware Park Golf Course
- Tri-Main Center
