= Trinity Episcopal Church (Buffalo, New York) =

Historic church in New York, United States

- U.S. National Register of Historic Places
- New York State Register of Historic Places
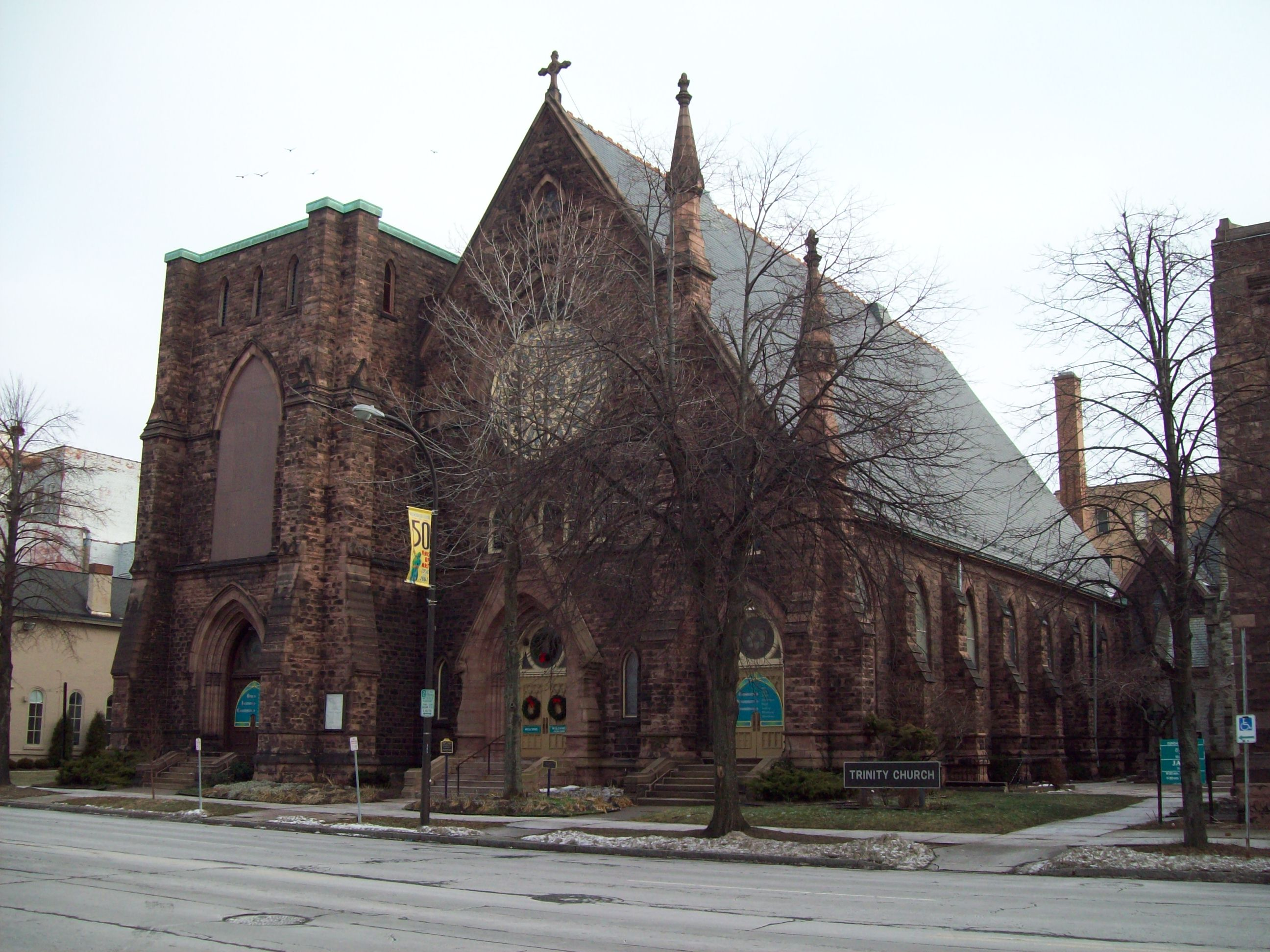
- Trinity Episcopal Church, Buffalo NY, December 2009

- Location within New York Location within the United States
- Location: 371 Delaware Ave., Buffalo, New York
- Coordinates: 42°53′41.14″N 78°52′28.57″W
- Built: 1884
- Architects: Gilman, Arthur; Porter, Cyrus; Cram, Goodhue & Ferguson
- Architectural style: Gothic, Late Gothic Revival
- NRHP reference No.: 08000100
- NYSRHP No.: 02940.000646

Significant dates
- Added to NRHP: February 28, 2008
- Designated NYSRHP: December 21, 2007

Trinity Episcopal Church is a historic Episcopal church complex located at Buffalo in Erie County, New York. The oldest part of the complex was built in 1869 as the Gothic Revival style Christ Chapel; it was later redesigned in 1913. The main church was constructed in 1884 in the Victorian Gothic style and features stained glass windows designed by John LaFarge and Tiffany studios. The parish house, designed by Cram, Goodhue & Ferguson, was constructed in 1905.

A large Schlicker organ was installed in late 1954, consisting of two divisions and two three-manual consoles. Church organists Reed Jerome and Dorothy Forbes gave the inaugural concert; two weeks later E. Powers Biggs gave a concert.

It was listed on the National Register Of Historic Places in 2008.

== Gallery ==
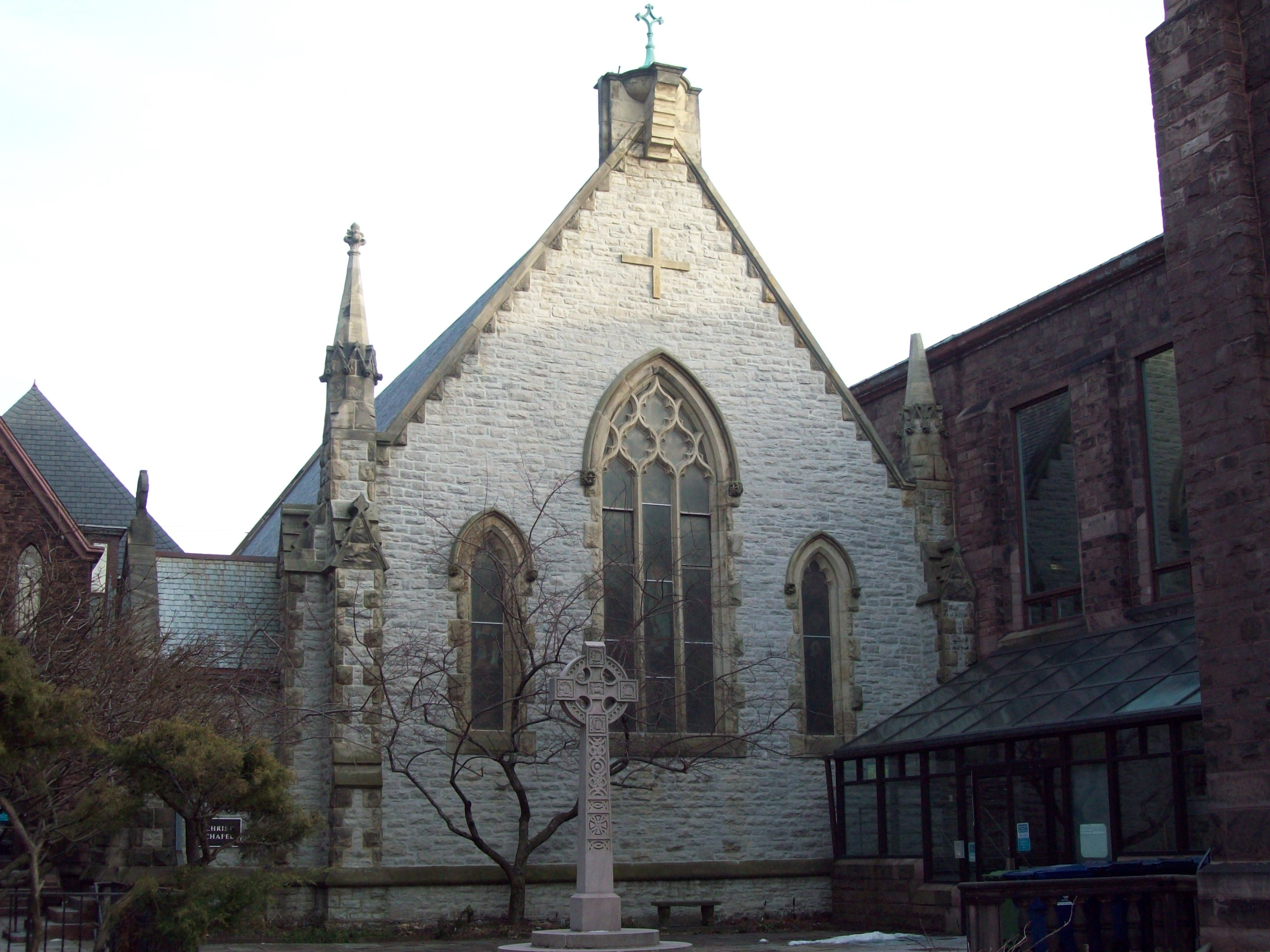
Christ Chapel At Trinity Church, December 2009
