= Delaware Avenue Methodist Episcopal Church =

Historic church in New York, United States

- U.S. National Register of Historic Places
- New York State Register of Historic Places
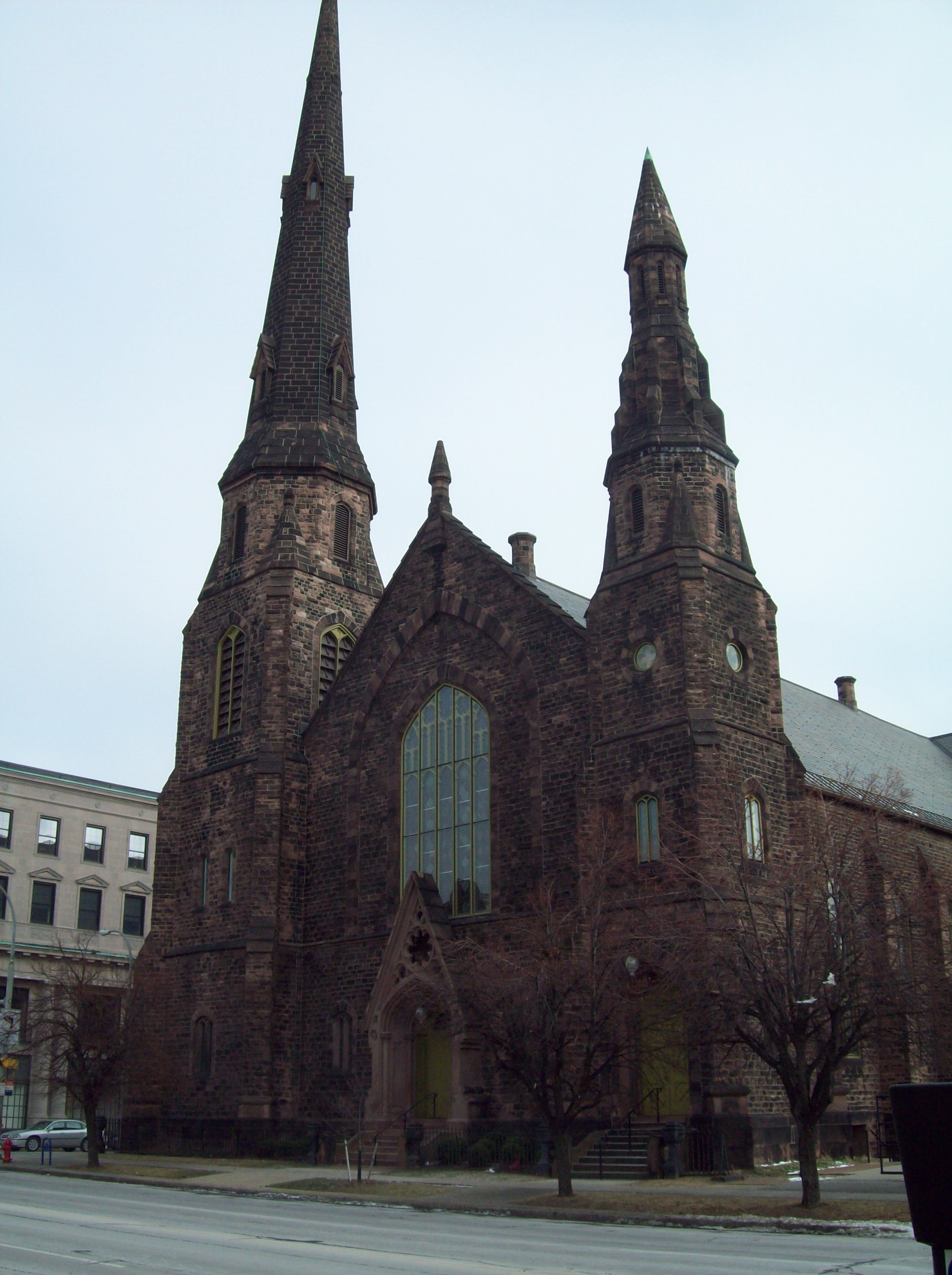
- Delaware Avenue Methodist Episcopal Church, December 2009

- Location within New York Location within the United States
- Location: 339 Delaware Ave., Buffalo, New York
- Coordinates: 42°53′37″N 78°52′31″W
- Built: 1874
- Architects: Selkirk, John
- Architectural style: Gothic
- NRHP reference No.: 03001149
- NYSRHP No.: 02940.002925

Significant dates
- Added to NRHP: November 15, 2003
- Designated NYSRHP: September 19, 2003

Delaware Avenue Methodist Episcopal Church, also known as Asbury-Delaware Methodist Church, is a historic Methodist Episcopal Church located at Buffalo in Erie County, New York. It was constructed in two phases between 1871 and 1876 and is a distinct example of High Victorian Gothic ecclesiastical architecture. In 2006, the structure became home to Righteous Babe Records, and known as "The Church" or "Babeville".

It was listed on the National Register of Historic Places in 2003.
