= Buffalo Theatre District =

- Neighborhood of Buffalo
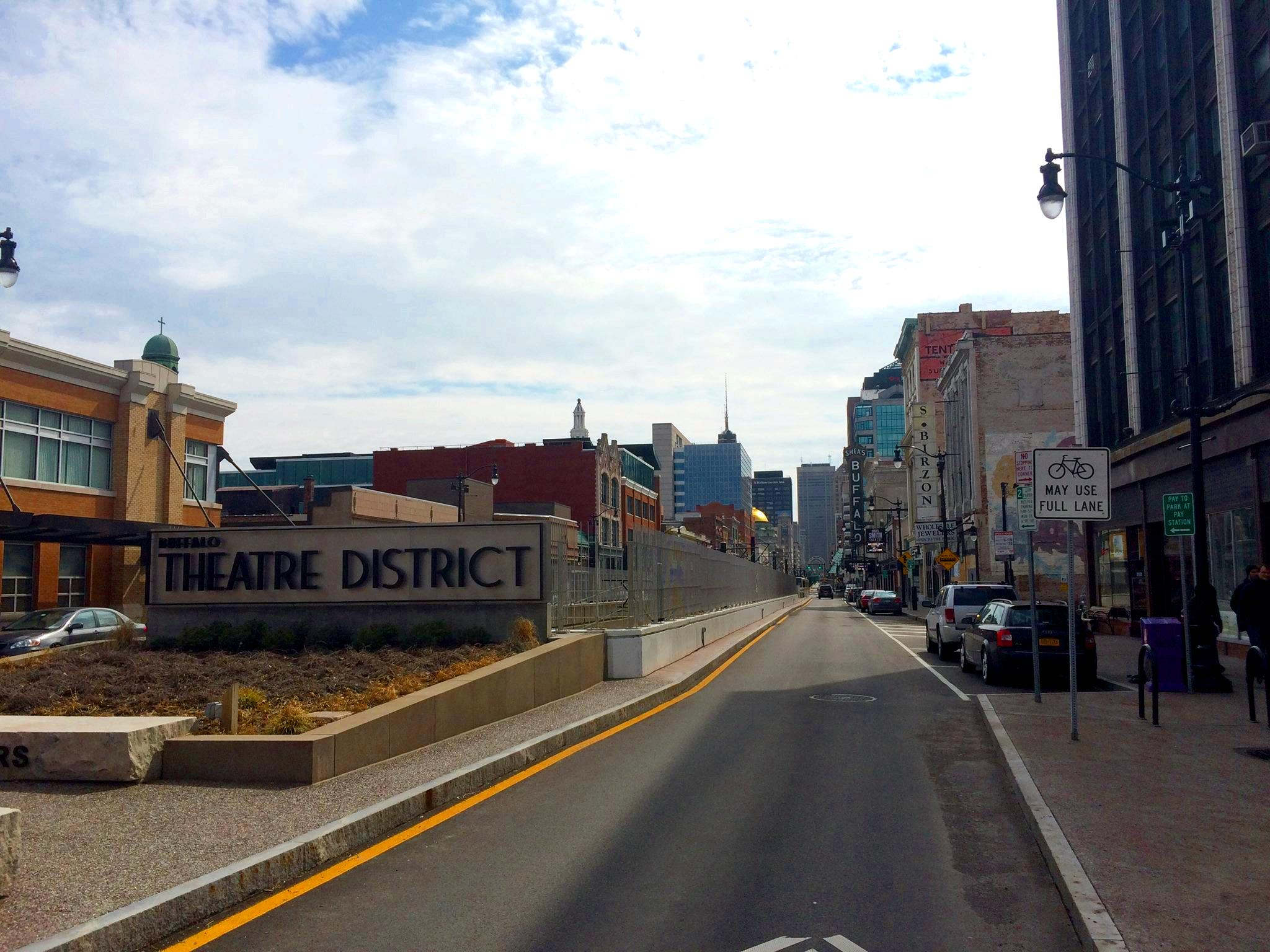
- Interactive map of Buffalo Theatre District
- Coordinates: 42°53′29″N 78°52′21″W
- Country: United States
- State: New York
- County: Erie County
- City: Buffalo, New York
- Established: 1980
- Website: buffaloplace.com/theatre

The Buffalo Theatre District in downtown Buffalo, New York, United States, is the center of Buffalo's theater scene and draws Broadway shows that are in preview stage or on tour. It is bounded roughly by Washington, Tupper, Pearl and Chippewa Streets.

== History ==
The impetus for saving and revitalizing the district came from a 1978 plan sponsored by Jimmy Griffin, Mayor of Buffalo. The co-directors of the master plan were Harold Cohen, Dean of the SUNY Buffalo School of Architecture, and David Parry, Architect and Professor of the Urban Design Studio. A crash program was needed because of the threat of wholesale demolition.

There were over 50 theaters in the district in the early 20th C., when the city was called the "Gateway to the West", and served by railroads and the new Erie Canal. In the 1950s, growth reversed into a decline. By 1978 the district was over 65% vacant. The plan called for the City to take ownership of most buildings thru tax foreclosure, then restore facades, and manage the district via a new nonprofit corporation.

A film explaining the 1978 planning process, titled "The Revitalization of Buffalo's Historic Theater District", can be seen on YouTube.

From 1980 to 2004, in accordance with the area's land development terms, 25% of the net profit from the district was returned to the city by the nonprofit corporation. The district received about $60 million from government to restore it and finance development.

== Theatres ==
- Alleyway Theatre
- Irish Classical Theatre Company
- Road Less Traveled Productions
- Shea's 710 Theatre
- Shea's Performing Arts Center
- Shea's Smith Theatre

== See also ==
- Theater District, New York
