= FreeCityBus =

British bus operating company

Metro Connect FreeCityBus Metro Connect FreeTownBus

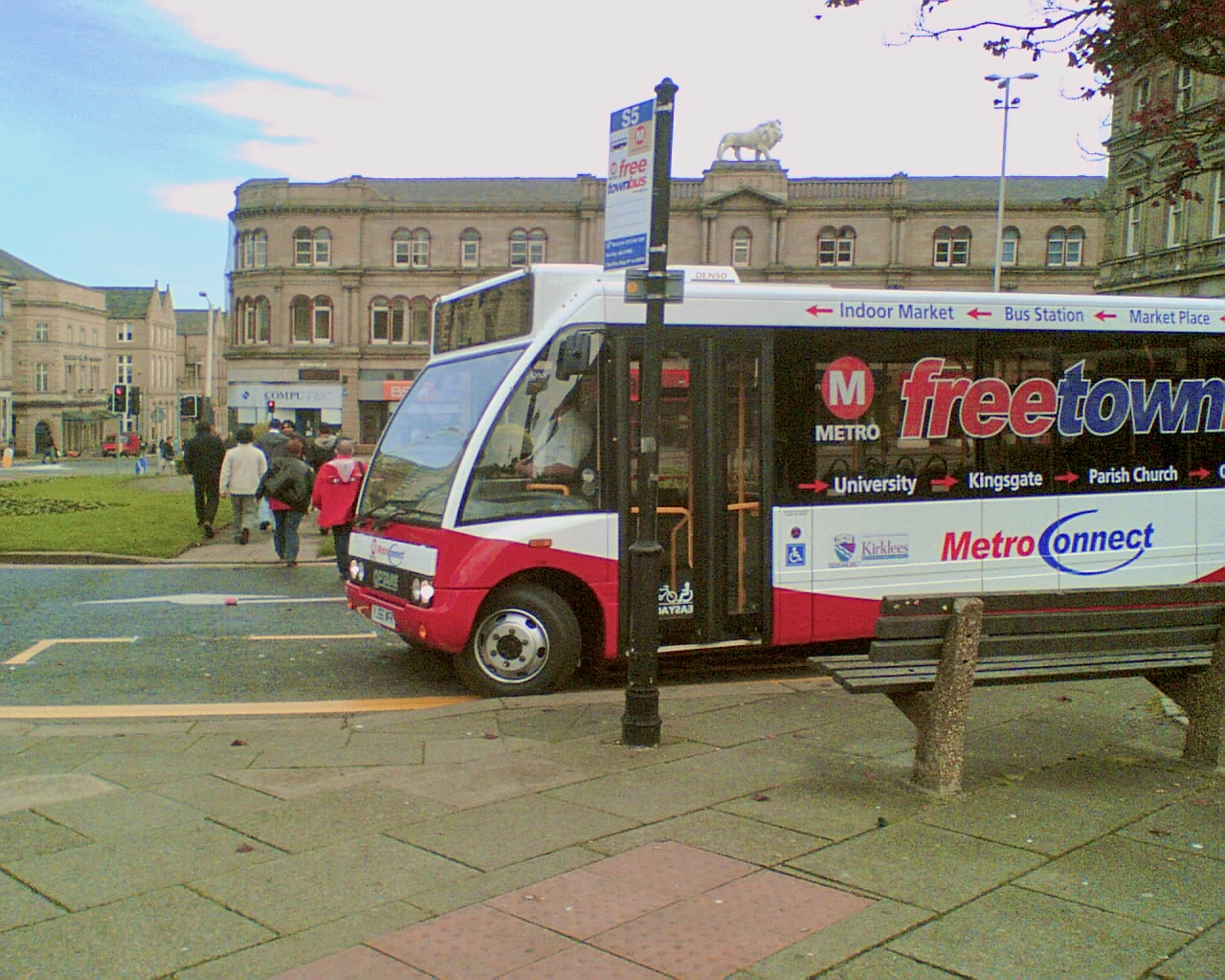
- The Huddersfield FreeTownBus
- Parent: West Yorkshire Metro
- Founded: January 2006
- Headquarters: Leeds, West Yorkshire
- Service area: West Yorkshire
- Destinations: Bradford; Wakefield; Huddersfield; Dewsbury
- Operator: First West Yorkshire, Star Travel, Tiger Blue
- Website: www.wymetro.com

FreeCityBus or FreeTownBus is a family of zero-fare bus services which are operated in the centres of several cities and towns in the English county of West Yorkshire. The services operate as FreeCityBus in the city of Wakefield and as FreeTownBus in the towns of Huddersfield and Dewsbury. The service is run under contract to West Yorkshire Metro. FreeCityBus had also operated in Leeds between 2006 and 2011 before being replaced by LeedsCityBus in April 2011 then joining onto route 5 in 2016 and in Bradford before being replaced by Bradford City Bus in 2016.

Since the first service began in 2006, over 11 million passengers have used the free bus services.

== Services ==
=== Leeds ===
The Leeds service began on 30 January 2006 and was the first bus service in West Yorkshire to use this format and was operated by First West Yorkshire. Metro renamed the service LeedsCityBus and introduced a flat 50-pence fare for each journey, with the service running a six-month trial period from 1 April 2011.

=== Huddersfield ===
This service began on 30 October 2006, after the success of the Leeds service earlier that year. In under six months the Huddersfield FreeTownBus had carried over 100,000 passengers. This service was originally introduced on the basis of a nine-month trial with two buses. The contract was later extended until 2011 depending on funding. A Boxing Day service was introduced in 2007, following funding from Metro, although this has since been dropped after one year.

As of July 2021, the current operator of this service is Team Pennine.

==== Route ====
Unlike the Leeds and Wakefield services, the service makes a complete circle without backtracking, and runs in an anti-clockwise direction. the Huddersfield FreeTownBus links the town's railway station with the bus station, the university and the shops and markets.

FreeTownBus Huddersfield
- Stop 1 - Rail Station
- Stop 2 - John William Street
- Stop 3 - Market Place
- Stop 4 - Market Street
- Stop 5 - Bus Station
- Stop 6 - High Street for Civic Centre
- Stop 7 - Indoor Market for Indoor Market, Town Hall, Library, Art Gallery and Piazza
- Stop 8 - The University of Huddersfield (Queen Street) for University of Huddersfield
- Stop 9 - Kingsgate for Kingsgate Shopping Centre and Packhorse Shopping Centre
- Stop 10 - Cross Church Street
- Stop 11 - Parish Church
- Stop 12 - Lord Street
- Stop 13 - Outdoor Market for Outdoor Market and Tesco
- Rail Station

=== Wakefield ===
The Wakefield service was announced early 2007 to begin at the end of April, and began at the planned time, the first run being around 7:30am on Monday 23 April 2007. Four hundred and fifty passengers used the service on its first running day. The service runs on a fleet of three buses. Star Travel was the first operator of the service, although as of 2012, Arriva Yorkshire now runs the service, transferring 3 Optare Solo vehicles from the previous operator and acquiring another one of these vehicles from First Leeds previously used on the Leeds City Bus Service. Although in 2018, Tetley's Coaches won the tender for the Service using 3 brand new Optare Solo SR vehicles.

==== Route ====
The service is the first bus to connect both railway stations, also the first to connect The Ridings, Market and main shopping area to the retail parks.

FreeCityBus Wakefield
- Stop 1 - Bus & Coach Station
- Stop 2 - Cathedral/The Springs for Cathedral and Market
- Stop 3 - Kirkgate/Ridings Centre for The Ridings shopping centre
- Stop 4 - Kirkgate Rail Station
- Stop 5 - Ings Road Retail Park
- Stop 6 - Sainsbury's
- Stop 7 - Charlesworth Way
- Stop 8 - Cineworld
- Stop 9 - Westgate Retail & Leisure Park
- Stop 10 - Westgate Rail Station
- Stop 11 - Westgate for The Ridings shopping centre
- Stop 12 - Bull Ring/Union Street (alighting only)
- Bus & Coach Station

=== Bradford ===
Proposals for a service in Bradford were first drawn up in 2007 after the successes elsewhere in West Yorkshire but a decision on the scheme was put on hold until December 2007 and then February 2008 by Bradford Council. In June 2008, a start date was finally announced with the first bus running on 29 September 2008. Initially the scheme was run as a 6-month trial, but in April 2009 it was announced that the service would become permanent having attracted more than 4 times the expected number of passengers. Bradford Council and Metro are each providing 50% of the funding and have committed to the service until 2013. In November 2009, it was announced that the 1 millionth passenger had been carried on the Bradford service, and 1.5 million had been reached by June 2010.

There were 3 Optare Solo buses which ran the service Monday to Saturday. Each bus was sponsored; one by the University of Bradford, one by Bradford College and one by Grand Central; the latter was originally sponsored by Sovereign Health Care at launch. From launch, the service was run by First West Yorkshire; operations passed to Ladies Only Travel in April 2014, using the same three buses and timetable. Although as of October 2016, with the demise of Ladies Only Travel the service has since been dropped.

==== Route ====
The service ran every 10 minutes and connected Bradford's two railway stations, (Bradford Interchange and Forster Square, with the main shopping area, the college and university and the National Media Museum.

FreeCityBus Bradford
- Stop 1 - Bradford Interchange Stand W for buses, trains and The Leisure Exchange
- Stop 2 - Market Street
- Stop 3 - Canal Road / Bradford Cathedral
- Stop 4 - Forster Square station
- Stop 5 - Forster Square Shopping Park
- Stop 6 - Manor Row / Register Office
- Stop 7 - Oastler Centre / Rawson Square
- Stop 8 - Kirkgate Centre for Kirkgate shopping centre
- Stop 9 - City Hall / Centenary Square
- Stop 10 - National Media Museum / Ice Rink / Central Library
- Stop 11 - Bradford College
- Stop 12 - University of Bradford
- Stop 13 - Morley Street Resource Centre
- Stop 14 - Alhambra Theatre / West End
- Bradford Interchange

=== Dewsbury ===
The FreeTownBus started operating in Dewsbury on 12 December 2009. It is being funded by Metro, Kirklees Council and Sainsbury's supermarket, and used two buses, which were operated by Star Travel. Up until 2020, it was run by one vehicle operated by Yorkshire Tiger. As of 2021, it is operated using one vehicle from Station Coaches

==== Route ====
The service runs every 10 minutes and calls at the railway station and major shopping areas.

FreeTownBus Dewsbury
- Stop 1: Dewsbury bus station - Stand 17
- Stop 2: Dewsbury health centre
- Stop 3: Dewsbury railway station
- Stop 4: Dewsbury market (Northgate)
- Stop 5: Market Place
- Stop 6: Prince of Wales Precinct for bus station
- Stop 7: Retail Park / Library / Job Centre / Sports Centre
- Stop 8: Sainsbury's
- Stop 9: Dewsbury Minster
- Dewsbury bus station
