= Buffalo Creek =

Buffalo Creek may refer to:

== Waterways in the United States ==
=== Arkansas ===
- Buffalo Creek (Mountain Fork), a stream in Polk County

=== Illinois ===
- Buffalo Creek (Illinois)

=== Iowa ===
- Buffalo Creek (Clear Creek tributary), a stream in Iowa
- Buffalo Creek (Wapsipinicon River tributary), a river in Iowa; see List of rivers of Iowa § Upper Mississippi River drainage basin

=== Minnesota ===
- Buffalo Creek (Crow River tributary)
- Buffalo Creek (Crow Wing County, Minnesota)

=== Missouri ===
- Buffalo Creek (Blackwater River tributary), a stream in Missouri
- Buffalo Creek (Current River tributary), a stream in Missouri
- Buffalo Creek (Elk River tributary, Oklahoma), a stream in Missouri and Oklahoma
- Buffalo Creek (Mississippi River tributary), a stream in Missouri

=== New York ===
- Buffalo River (New York), known as Buffalo Creek southeast of the city of Buffalo
  - Treaties of Buffalo Creek

=== North Carolina ===
- Buffalo Creek (Deep River tributary), a stream in Moore County
- Buffalo Creek (Reedy Fork tributary), a stream in Guilford County

=== Oklahoma ===
- Buffalo Creek (Mountain Fork), a stream in McCurtain County

=== Pennsylvania ===
- Buffalo Creek (Allegheny River tributary)
- Buffalo Creek (Juniata River tributary)
- Buffalo Creek (Ohio River tributary)
- Buffalo Creek (West Branch Susquehanna River tributary)

=== South Carolina ===
- Buffalo Creek (South Carolina)

=== South Dakota ===
- Buffalo Creek (Dewey County, South Dakota)
- Buffalo Creek (Harding County, South Dakota)
- Buffalo Creek (Lake and Minnehaha counties, South Dakota)

=== Texas ===
- Buffalo Creek (Texas)

=== West Virginia ===
- Buffalo Creek (Guyandotte River tributary), in Logan County
  - Buffalo Creek flood, involving the above creek
- Buffalo Creek (Monongahela River tributary), in Marion County
- Buffalo Creek (Ohio River tributary), in Brooke County
- Buffalo Creek (South Branch Potomac River tributary), in Hampshire County

== Settlements ==
- Buffalo Creek, Northern Territory, Australia
- Buffalo Creek, Colorado, U.S.
- Warrensville, North Carolina, U.S., formerly called Buffalo Creek

== See also ==
- Big Buffalo Creek
- Buffalo River (disambiguation)
