= Rhine Creek =

Rhine Creek may refer to:

- Rhine Creek (Iowa)
- Rhine Creek (Minnesota)
- Rhine Creek (West Virginia)
