= Buffalo River =

Buffalo River may refer to:

== Australia ==
- Buffalo River (Victoria)

== Canada ==
- Buffalo River (Alberta), tributary of the Peace River

== South Africa ==
- Buffalo River (Eastern Cape)
- Buffalo River (KwaZulu-Natal)
- Buffalo River (Groot River), Southern Cape

== United States ==
- Buffalo National River, Arkansas
- Buffalo River (Georgia)
- Buffalo River (Minnesota)
- Buffalo River (Mississippi), a tributary of the Mississippi River in Mississippi
- Buffalo River (New York)
- Buffalo River (Tennessee)
- Buffalo Bayou in Houston, Texas
- Buffalo River (Virginia)
- Buffalo River (Wisconsin)

== See also ==
- Buffalo Creek (disambiguation)
- Buffalo River State Park (disambiguation)
