= Whitewater Creek =

Whitewater Creek may refer to:

- Whitewater Creek (Colorado), a stream in Colorado
- Whitewater Creek (Chattahoochee River tributary), a stream in Georgia
- Whitewater Creek (Flint River tributary), a stream in Georgia
- Whitewater Creek (South Dakota), a stream in South Dakota
- Whitewater Creek (New Mexico), a stream in New Mexico
