= Horse Hollow =

Horse Hollow may refer to:

- Horse Hollow (Ripley County, Missouri)
- Horse Hollow (Shannon County, Missouri)
