= Kochendefer Covered Bridge =

- Kochenderfer Covered Bridge
- U.S. National Register of Historic Places
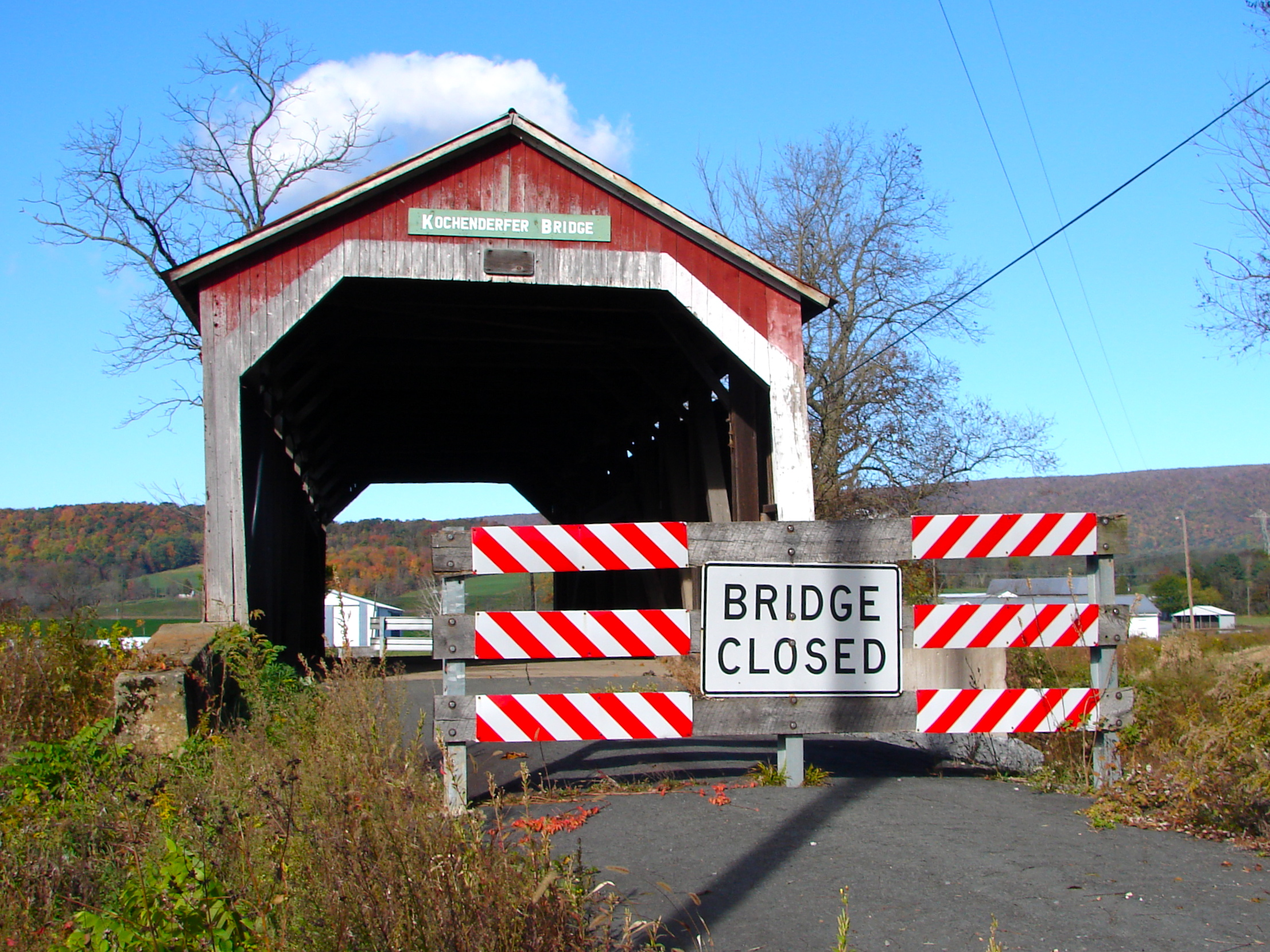
- Western end of the bridge

- Location within Pennsylvania Location within the United States
- Location: Southeast of Saville on Township 332, Saville Township, Pennsylvania
- Coordinates: 40°25′27″N 77°23′15″W
- Area: 0.1 acres (0.040 ha)
- Built: 1919
- Architect: Adain Bros.
- Architectural style: Modified Kingpost, Queenpost
- MPS: Covered Bridges of Adams, Cumberland, and Perry Counties TR
- NRHP reference No.: 80003602
- Added to NRHP: August 25, 1980

The Kochenderfer Covered Bridge is an historic, wooden covered bridge in Saville Township in Perry County, Pennsylvania, United States. It crosses Big Buffalo Creek.

Built in 1919, it was listed on the National Register of Historic Places in 1980.

== History and architectural features ==
This historic structure is a 72-foot-long (22 m), modified king post, queen post truss bridge that was erected in 1919. Its WGCB reference is 38-50-09.

== See also ==
- National Register of Historic Places listings in Perry County, Pennsylvania

== Gallery ==
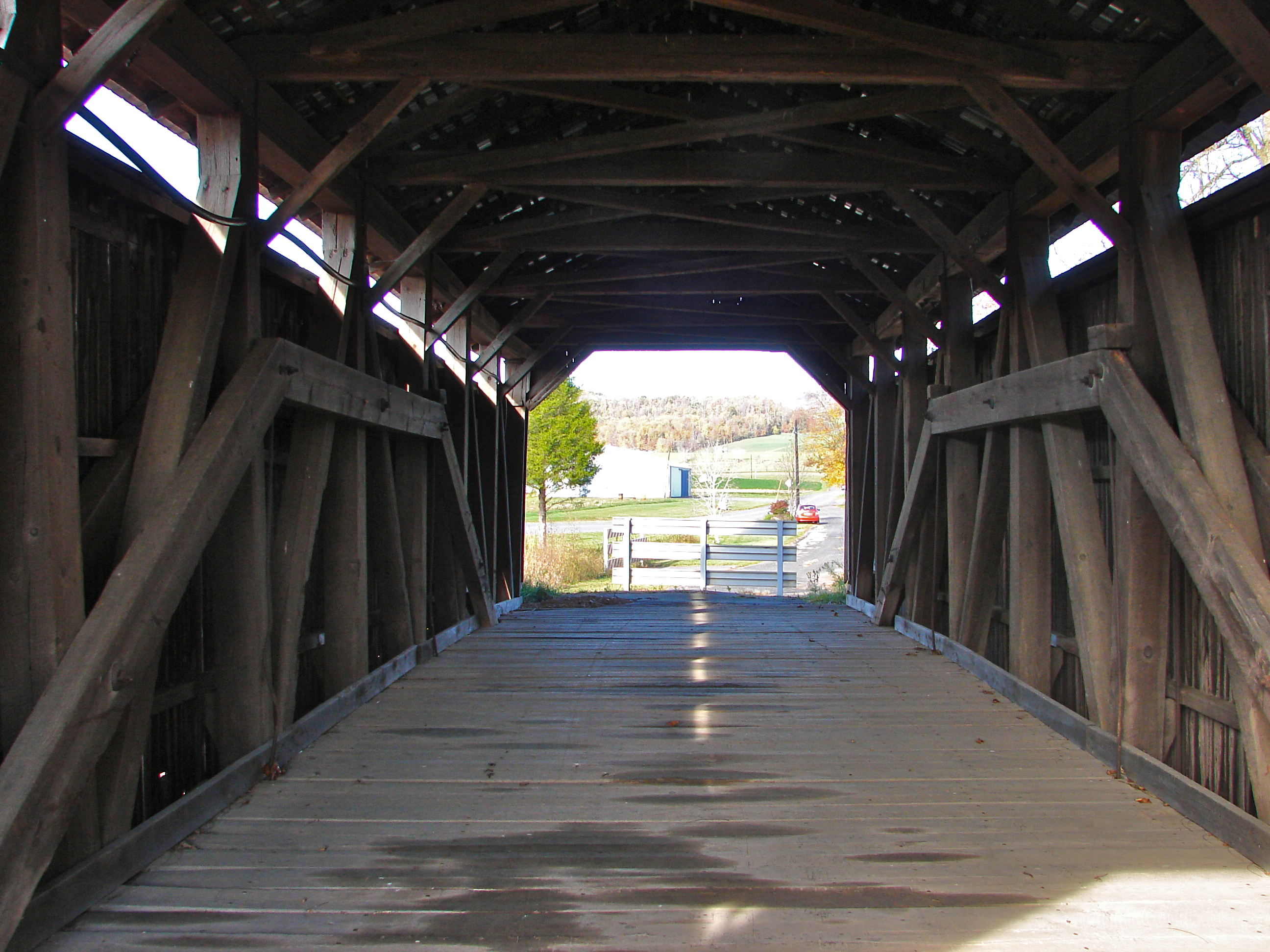
Interior view of truss
