= Buffalo Township, Pike County, Missouri =

Township in Pike County, Missouri, U.S.

Coordinates: 39.4150°N 91.0939°W

Buffalo Township is an inactive township in Pike County, in the U.S. state of Missouri.

Buffalo Township was erected in 1819, taking its name from Buffalo Creek.
