= Saville Township, Pennsylvania =

Township in Pennsylvania, US

Coordinates: 40°27′00″N 77°19′59″W

- Township
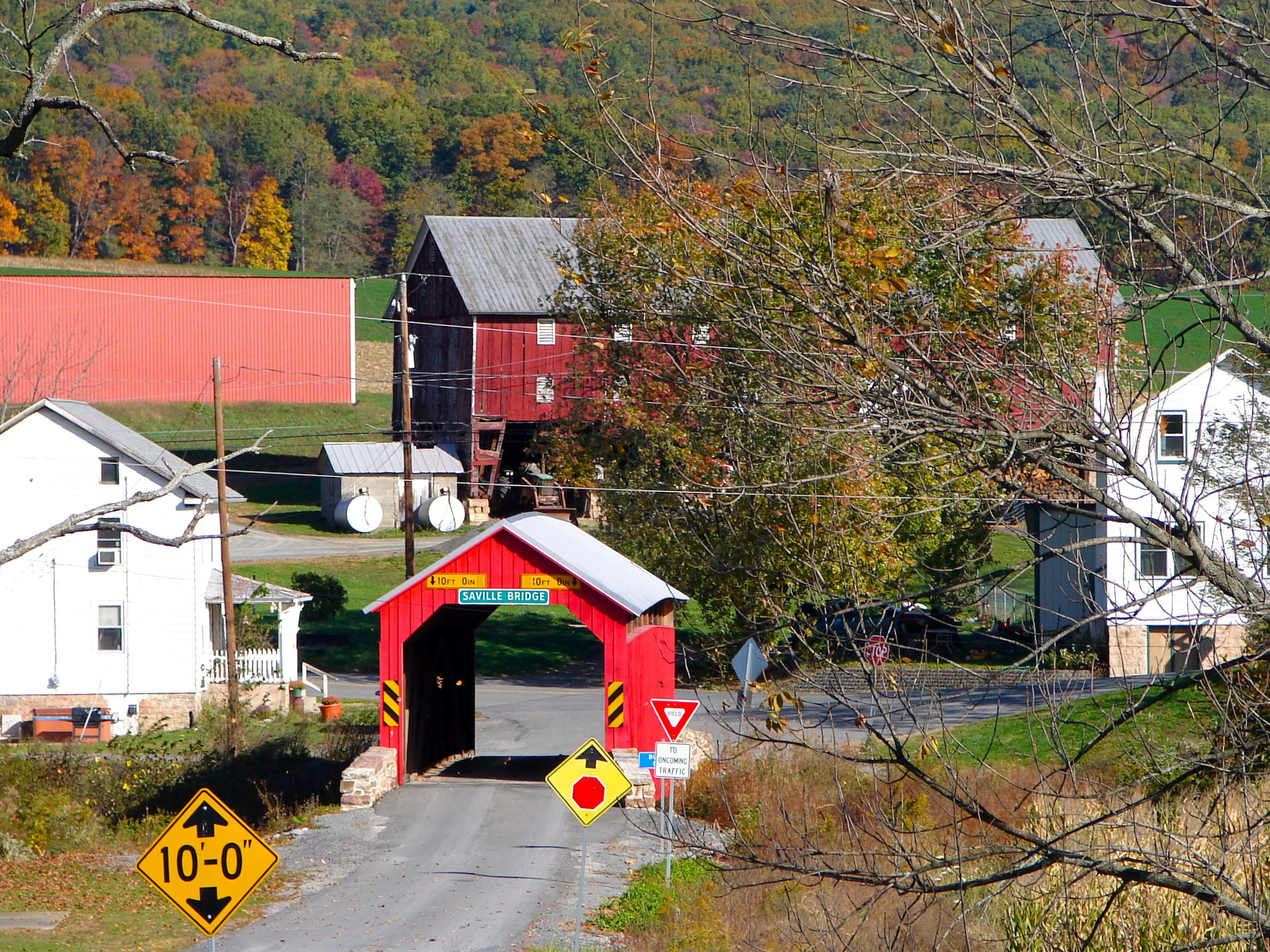
- Saville Covered Bridge

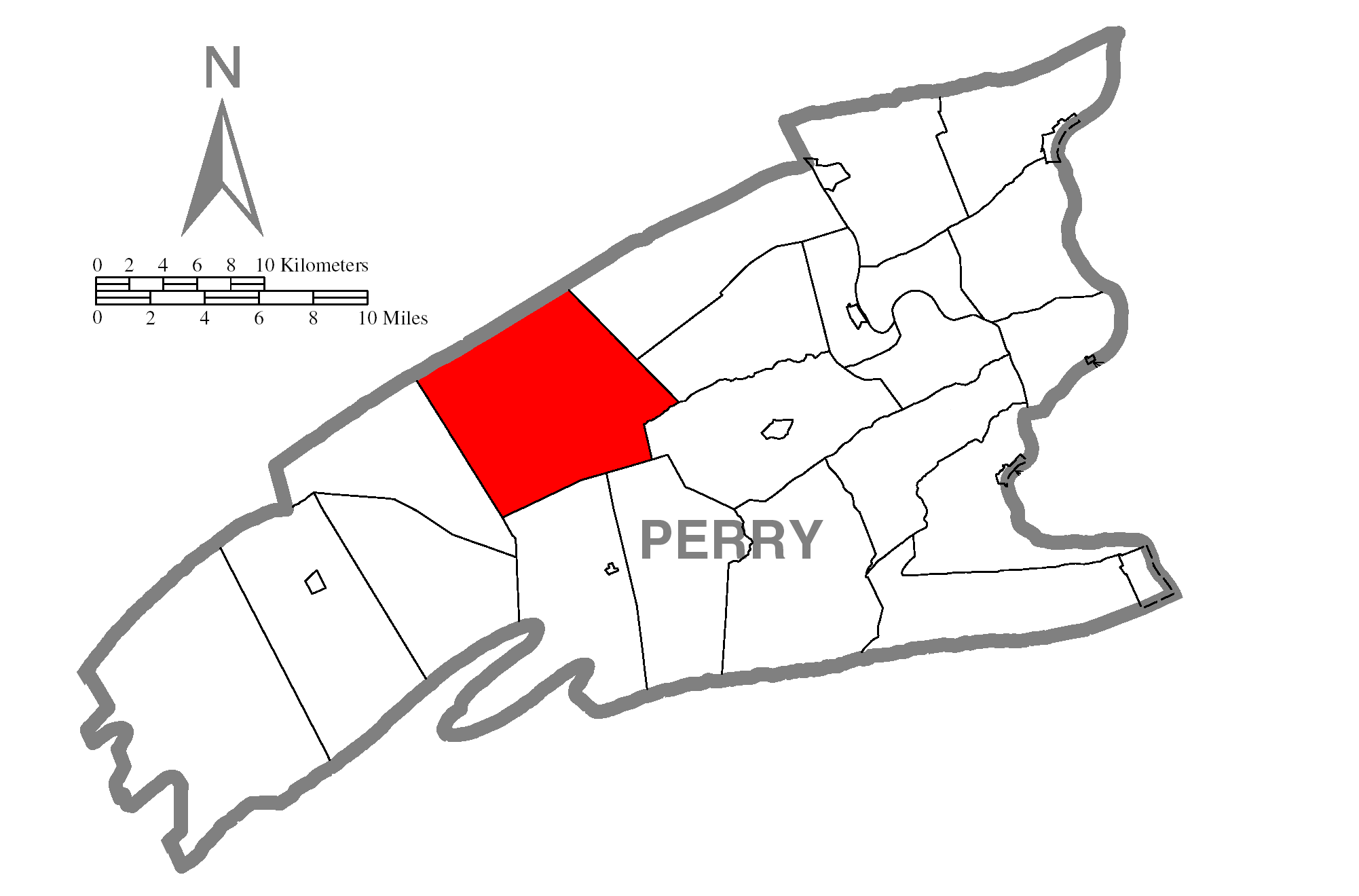
- Map of Perry County, Pennsylvania highlighting Saville Township

- Map of Perry County, Pennsylvania
- Country: United States
- State: Pennsylvania
- County: Perry
- Settled: 1755
- Incorporated: 1817

Area
  - Total: 45.99 sq mi (119.12 km^{2})
  - Land: 45.92 sq mi (118.94 km^{2})
  - Water: 0.066 sq mi (0.17 km^{2})

Population (2020)
  - Total: 2,598 ▲
  - Estimate (2023): 2,614
  - Density: 54.5/sq mi (21.03/km^{2})
- Time zone: UTC-5 (Eastern (EST))
  - Summer (DST): UTC-4 (EDT)
- Area code: 717
- FIPS code: 42-099-68032
- Website: https://savilletwp.com/

Saville Township is a second-class township in a mountainous part of Perry County, Pennsylvania, United States. As of the 2020 census, the township had a total population of 2,598. It was founded in 1817, dividing from Tyrone Township while the area was still part of Cumberland County. It is served by two major roads, PA 74, locally called Veterans Way, and PA 17, called the Tuscorara Path. The county office is at 3954 Veterans Way, in Elliottsburg, in the far southern part of the township. The area is overwhelmingly agricultural, with small population centers in Ickesburg and the hamlet of Saville.

== History ==
The Kochendefer Covered Bridge and Saville Covered Bridge are listed on the National Register of Historic Places.

== Geography ==
According to the U.S. Census Bureau, the township has a total area of 46.0 square miles (119.2 km^{2}), all land.

== Demographics ==
Historical population
Census	Pop.	Note	%±
2010	2,502		—
2020	2,598		3.8%
2023 (est.)	2,614		0.6%
U.S. Decennial Census

As of the census of 2000, there were 2,204 people, 796 households, and 609 families living in the township. The population density was 47.9 inhabitants per square mile (18.5/km^{2}). There were 984 housing units at an average density of 21.4/sq mi (8.3/km^{2}). The racial makeup of the township was 98.37% White, 0.68% African American, 0.23% Native American, 0.18% Asian, 0.09% from other races, and 0.45% from two or more races. Hispanic or Latino of any race were 0.64% of the population.

There were 796 households, out of which 36.7% had children under the age of 18 living with them, 62.8% were married couples living together, 7.5% had a female householder with no husband present, and 23.4% were non-families. 19.8% of all households were made up of individuals, and 8.4% had someone living alone who was 65 years of age or older. The average household size was 2.75 and the average family size was 3.16.

In the township the population was spread out, with 28.4% under the age of 18, 7.4% from 18 to 24, 29.8% from 25 to 44, 24.3% from 45 to 64, and 10.2% who were 65 years of age or older. The median age was 35 years. For every 100 females, there were 105.6 males. For every 100 females age 18 and over, there were 103.5 males.

The median income for a household in the township was $39,975, and the median income for a family was $44,922. Males had a median income of $32,352 versus $22,336 for females. The per capita income for the township was $16,454. About 6.1% of families and 8.3% of the population were below the poverty line, including 10.8% of those under age 18 and 6.4% of those age 65 or over.

== Notable people ==
- Lelia Dromgold Emig (1872-1957), genealogist and author
