= Lelia Dromgold Emig =

American genealogist (1872–1957)

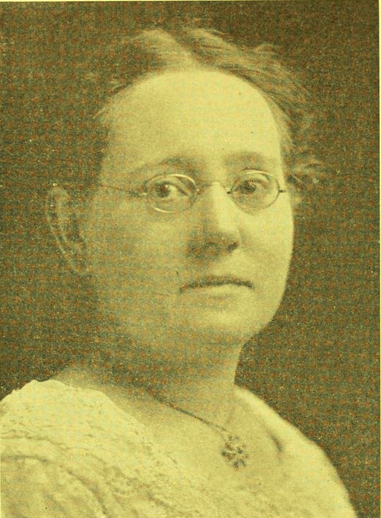
- (1922)
- Born: Lelia Alice Dromgold; January 21, 1872; Saville Township, Pennsylvania, U.S.
- Died: September 2, 1957 (aged 85); Washington, D.C., U.S.
- Occupations: Genealogist; author
- Known for: Philanthropy; club work
- Notable work: Record of the Annual Hench and Dromgold Reunion Held in Perry County, Pa., from 1897 to 1912
- Spouse: Clayton Ely Emig (m. 1894)
- Children: 3

Lelia Dromgold Emig (née, Dromgold; January 21, 1872 – September 2, 1957) was an American genealogist. She was the author and compiler of the Hench and Dromgold Records, which was a genealogy of the original families of Nicholas Ickes, John Hench, Zachariah A. Rice, John Hartman, Thomas Dromgold, and kindred families who had settled in Chester County, Pennsylvania prior to the American Revolutionary War, in which they fought. Through defective titles, these pioneers lost their lands, and it was thus that Perry County, Pennsylvania became the haven of those men and women, and whose descendants became a substantial part of the citizenship of Perry County. Early in life, Emig became interested in philanthropic and club work and held many positions of responsibility in the various organizations to which she belonged, including the General Federation of Women's Clubs, Woman's Christian Temperance Union (WCTU), Daughters of the American Revolution (D.A.R.), Young Women's Christian Association (YWCA), Rubinstein Club, and Women's City Club of Washington, D.C.

== Early life and education ==
Lelia Alice Dromgold was born near Saville Township, Pennsylvania, January 21, 1872. She was the daughter of Walker A. and Martha Ellen (Shull) Dromgold. When she was nine years of age, her mother died. She had attended the public schools here, but two years after her mother's death, with a brother, she went to York, Pennsylvania, where her father, of the firm of Hench & Dromgold, was engaged in the manufacturing business.

There she continued her studies in the public schools, in the Collegiate Institute of York, and the Peabody Conservatory of Music.

In 1890, she accompanied members of the Young WCTU on a Flower Mission visit to the county jail and became interested in temperance reform.

== Career ==
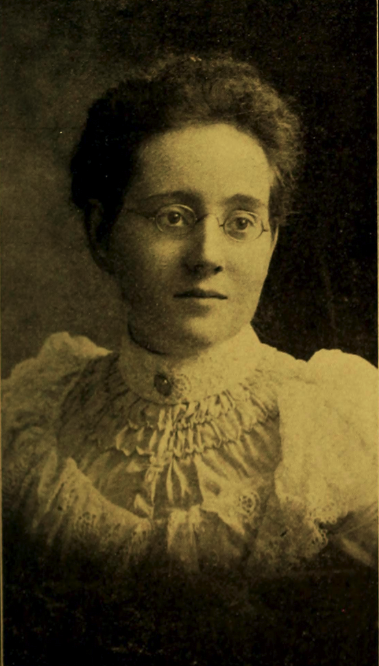
(from a 1908 publication)

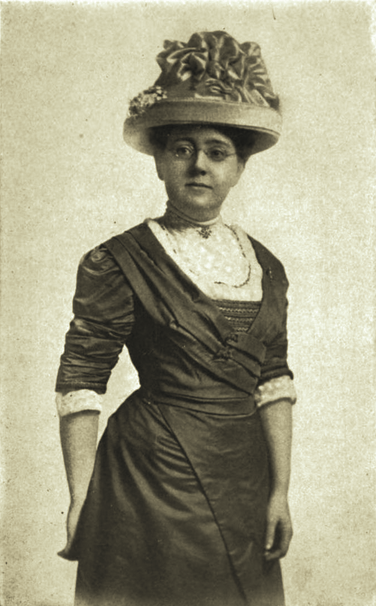
(from a 1913 publication)

On January 17, 1894, she married Clayton Ely Emig (1862–1940), an attorney-at-law, of Washington, D.C., and thereafter resided in the National Capital, their home at Dupont Circle being the center of a large and influential circle of friends.

Here she immediately became associated with the District WCTU and served as a local president, general secretary of work, and state corresponding secretary. She wrote several temperance leaflets.

Emig was known as an organizer and was the founder and organizing regen t of a large D.A.R. chapter named in honor of her ancestor, Abigail Hartman Rice, a nurse of Revolutionary days. Emig traced her ancestry to the following patriots of the Revolutionary War: John Hench, Jacob Hartman, Zachariah A. Rice, Nicholas Ickes, John Hartman, Frederick Shull, Thomas Donally, and Abigail Hartman Rice, of Pennsylvania.

In 1909, she organized a Society of Children of the American Revolution (NSCAR), which was named by Helen Herron Taft in honor of her ancestor, Thomas Welles, the fourth colonial governor of Connecticut. The society had 100 members and included many of the official families of Washington, D.C. This society from its membership produced fifty who served in World War I.

As a member of Calvary Baptist Church, Emig was interested in city mission work.

It was through the interest created by the Hench and Dromgold Reunions held in Perry County that Emig became enthusiastic about genealogical work. In 1915, she compiled and published her work on the Hench, Dromgold, and allied families.

== Personal life and death ==
She had three daughters, Evelyn (1895–1982), Gladys (1897–1993), and Lelia (1900–1952), who were followers of their mother's philanthropic work.

During World War I, her daughters all served in the government. Gladys and Lelia were among the first women to enroll as Yoemen, First Class, in the U.S. Navy, and Evelyn was in the office of the Adjutant General. Her husband, Capt. Emig, served for seventeen months in the Aviation Department of the Signal Corps.

Lelia Dromgold Emig died in Washington, D.C., September 2, 1957. She was buried at Arlington National Cemetery. The Leila and Clayton Emig Papers are held by the Western Reserve Historical Society.

== Selected works ==
- Emig, Lelia Dromgold (1913). Record of the Annual Hench and Dromgold Reunion Held in Perry County, Pa., from 1897 to 1912: These Records Contain the Genealogies of Nicholas Ickes, Johannes Hench, Zachariah Rice, John Hartman, Thomas Dromgold and Kindred Families who Were Among the Early Settlers of Chester Co., and Served in the Revolution. United Evangelical Press. OCLC 14048083 – via Internet Archive.
