= Canalside =

Canalside Erie Canal Harbor
- Neighborhood of Buffalo
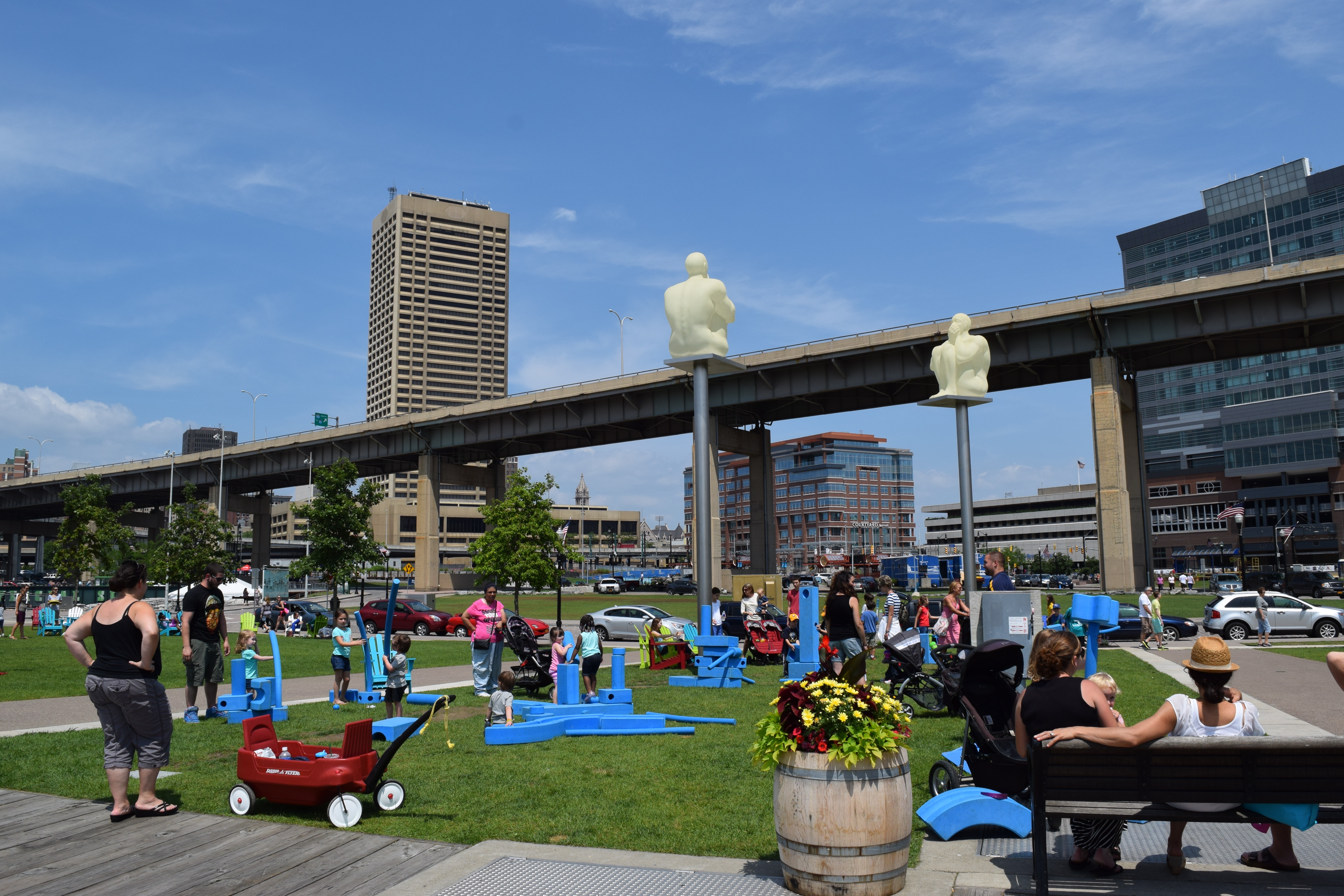
- View of Canalside from Central Wharf, looking north

- Location within New York Location within the United States
- Coordinates: 42°53′29″N 78°52′21″W
- Country: United States
- State: New York
- County: Erie County
- City: Buffalo
- Website: www.canalsidebuffalo.com

Canalside, formerly known as Canal Side and also referred to as Erie Canal Harbor, is a mixed-use recreational and entertainment district in downtown Buffalo, New York. It is the recreation of the western terminus of the Erie Canal, which was destroyed in the early 20th century. Canalside is situated on the Buffalo River, in an area that was historically home to the Seneca people.

In the early 20th century, the predominantly Italian area called Canal Street and Dante Placed (also known as The Hooks) was subjected to the forces of urban renewal, and the canals were filled in and dense neighborhoods were razed. The Buffalo Skyway, Buffalo Memorial Auditorium and Niagara Thruway took its place, with parking lots interspersed.

With the completion of Marine Midland Arena (now KeyBank Center) in 1996, the Memorial Auditorium stood vacant. Empire State Development Corporation created a master plan for an Erie Canal Harbor redevelopment project in 1999, which addressed developing parcels of land underneath the Buffalo Skyway. In 2004, a new plan was created, centered around the creation of historically-aligned canals and mixed-use development.

Several delays and controversies surrounding the planning, redevelopment and construction of the district drew reaction from the public, notably the inclusion of a flagship Bass Pro Shops store in 2007 that was later scrapped. The Memorial Auditorium was demolished by July 2009, and the land it occupied was subdivided into the historically aligned parcels from the 19th century, now known as the North and South Aud Block. Since 2010, the district has seen an uptick in construction projects and touring concerts and events. Projects completed or underway in the vicinity include LECOM Harborcenter adjacent to Main Street and Explore & More Children's Museum on the South Aud Block.

== History ==
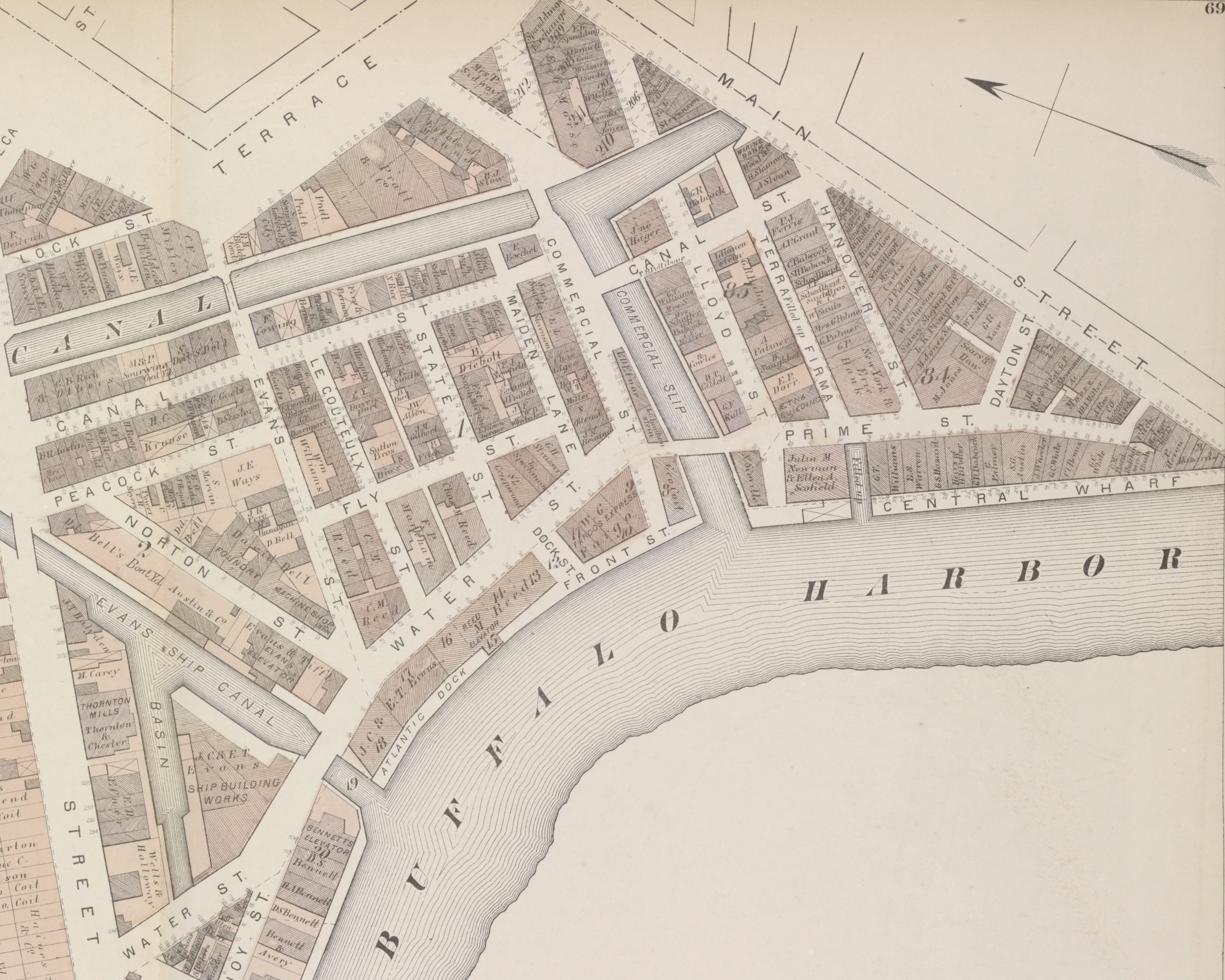
Buffalo's Canal Street neighborhood in 1872 was a dense, canal oriented neighborhood

Map of neighborhood mainstays

Originally built in Buffalo, New York in 1825 as the "portal to the west," the Erie Canal Harbor served as the terminus for the passage of goods and passengers from the East Coast across the Great Lakes for much of the 19th century. More importantly for Buffalo, the commercial activity fueled by the harbor helped transform the city into a thriving metropolis. Buffalo's notorious Canal Street was a short distance from the canal terminus.

The area had been the site of the original Village of Buffalo, near a Seneca Indian village on Buffalo Creek. The city eventually expanded outward from the waterfront location.

The Canal, completed in 1825, opened up the western United States to travelers and trade from the east coast. With it came a tremendous increase in Great Lakes freighter traffic at Buffalo harbor, and with that an influx of canal and freighter crewmen who were often paid off in Buffalo and spent freely in the bars and brothels that sprang up in the district, known variously as "Canal Street", "Five Points" "the Flats" and "the Hooks". There were 93 saloons, 15 concert-hall dives, and hundreds of dance-hall girls. The song "Buffalo Gals" was written by John Hodges in 1844 and refers to the women who lived in the canal district.

In the early 20th century, after the Erie Canal was deepened and shortened in 1895 and as the canal traffic moved to the railroads the district became the home of Italian immigrants, mostly Sicilian. Canal Street's name was changed to Dante Place and the neighborhood became known as Dante Place or "Little Italy." Most of the bars and brothels gave way to three- and four-story brick tenements, each housing multiple families.

By the late 1920s, the Canal had been filled in by New York State who saw the stagnant and polluted canal waters as a public health risk.

Throughout its existence, the neighborhood suffered numerous fires, explosions, and other disasters. The most notable occurred on January 1, 1936 very early in the morning. Joseph Lopresti at 40 LeCouteulx just across the street from Our Lady of Mount Carmel Church came home from Mass, lit a candle, and went into his tenement basement to get some wine. He was outside accessing the basement doors when the building exploded. This brought national attention to slum areas and new legislation was passed by New York State that allowed cities the right to condemn and demolish "unsafe and unsanitary" buildings. That began the urban renewal process leading to the beginning of the demolition of the tenements of Dante Place and by 1937, over 160 buildings had been demolished. By 1948, only 90 families remained in the area.

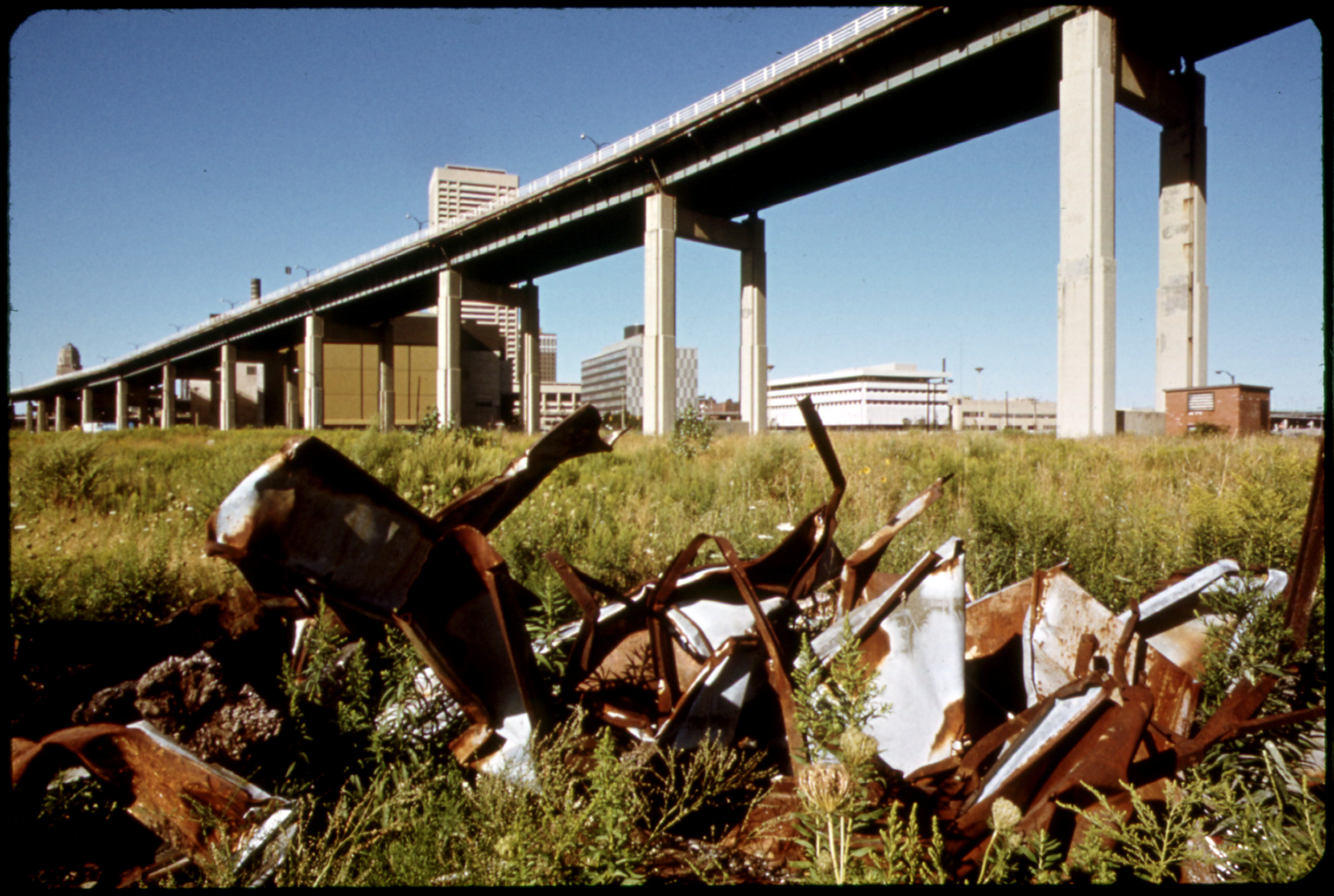
Canalside in 1973 before redevelopment

In 1938 there were plans to build new housing in the area dubbed "Fairhaven Village" which called for accommodations for 962 families with a total of 2,942 rooms at $17.50 a room including utilities with a 500 car underground garage. The effects of the Great Depression and World War II limited the construction funds needed to make the project a reality. Around the same time, Buffalo city officials used Works Progress Administration funds to build the Buffalo Memorial Auditorium on the former northeastern portion of the neighborhood. The last remnants of the former Canal Street/Dante Place neighborhood were demolished in 1950. The "Fairhaven Village" project was revived as the Dante Place Projects. Now known as the Marine Drive Apartments, they were completed in 1952. The New York State Thruway and the Skyway was later built in 1955.

The Commercial Slip was a remnant of Little Buffalo Creek, which flowed into the Buffalo River just before the larger stream entered Lake Erie. The Commercial Slip formed one boundary of Buffalo's infamous Canal District, and was filled in when the district was marked for urban renewal in the 1950s. By that time, the New York State Thruway and the Skyway and Buffalo Memorial Auditorium had been built over the Canal district, and the Commercial Slip was buried and forgotten.

== Reconstruction and redevelopment ==
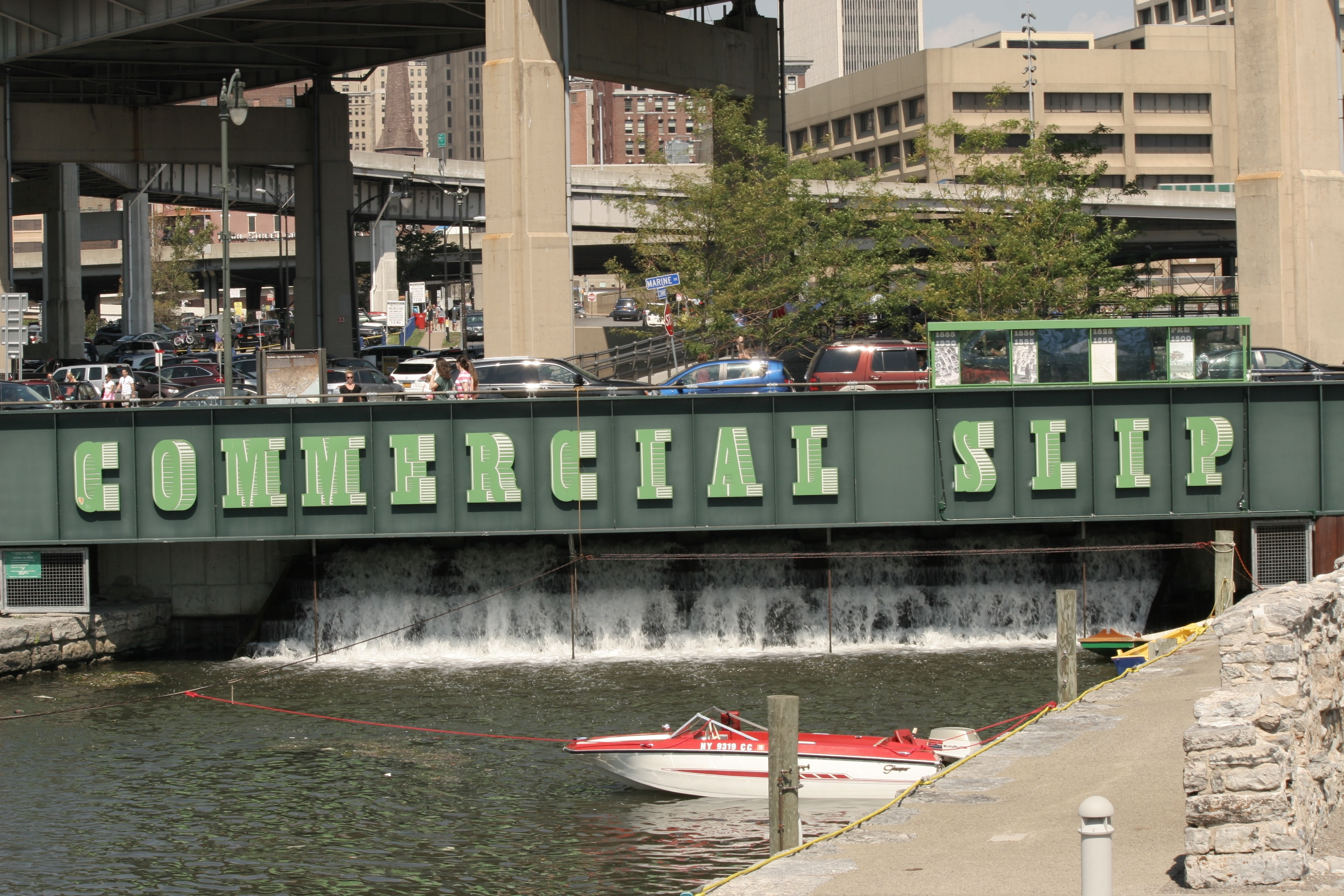
Erie Canal Commercial Slip in Summer 2016

In the late 1990s, public authorities began showing an interest in reviving Buffalo's Erie Canal heritage. Initially, plans called for re-creating some buried elements of the Canal. However a public outcry, with pressure from citizens' groups and the local media, convinced the planners to excavate and restore actual portions of the district, including the Commercial Slip.

In 2005, $279 million over 50 years was made available for the project via a re-licensing deal with the New York Power Authority that re-licensed the Niagara Power Project. The deal also established the Erie Canal Harbor Development Corporation to manage the funds and projects on the waterfront.

The Erie Canal Redevelopment project unearthed building foundations from the Canal-era neighborhood and restored the Commercial Slip, which formed the original natural outlet of Little Buffalo Creek into the Buffalo River.

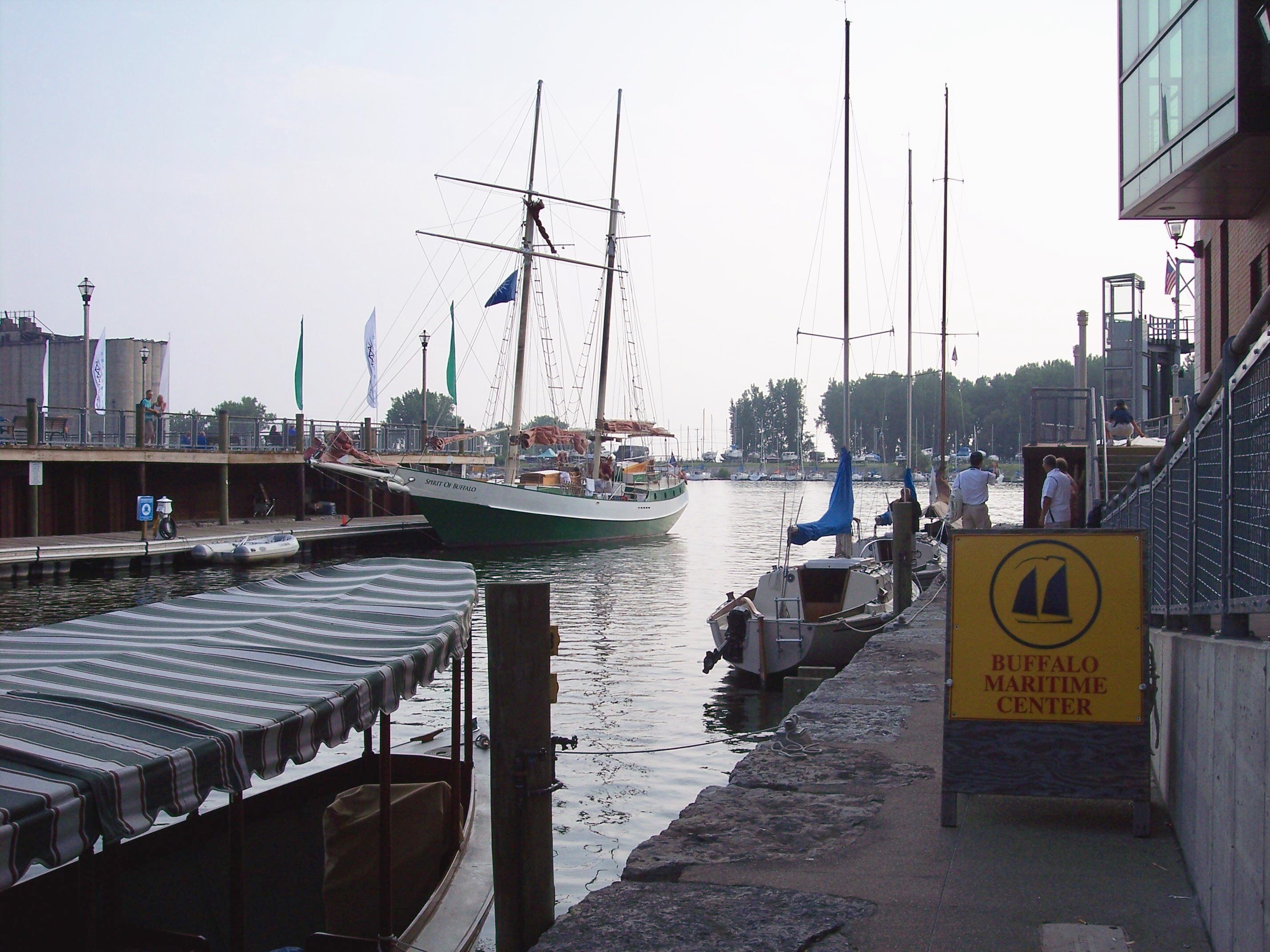
Buffalo Maritime Center along the Commercial Slip

Completed in 2008, Phase 2 of inner harbor plan laid out by the Erie Canal Harbor Development Corporation consisted of a re-watered navigable Commercial Slip in alignment with the original Commercial Slip, towpath/walkway on the west and east sides of the Commercial Slip, construction of a bowstring truss bridge, reconstructed Commercial Street, Steamboat Hotel and Lloyd Street ruins uncovered and preserved as an archeological site with a combination hard and grass surface, and the site of the former Union Block as an interpreted site with a grassy, sloped lawn.

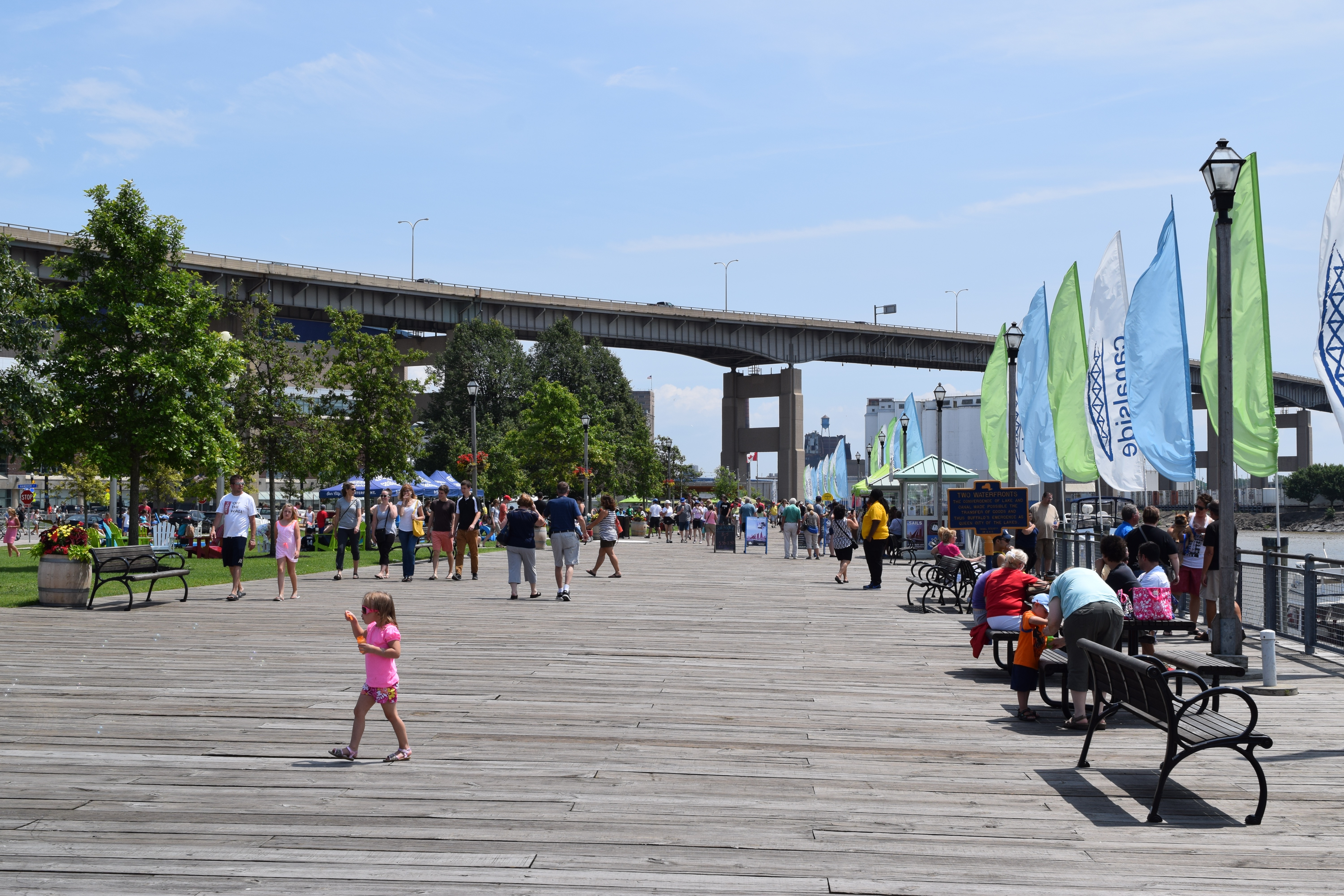
Looking down Canalside's Central Wharf. This boardwalk was lined with saloons and shops in the 19th century.

From 2008 to 2009, the former Buffalo Memorial Auditorium was demolished, as it was an ailing structure. Initially, plans were in place to construct a Bass Pro store on the location. The plans eventually were scrapped as Bass Pro decided against the location.

As the culmination of nearly a decade's worth of effort, the first phase of the historic canal harbor area redevelopment opened to the public in 2008. It included the recreation of several distinctive features of the original Canal district, such as the Commercial Slip, which served as the historic juncture between the Erie Canal and the Great Lakes; the wooden-plank Central Wharf, which stretched from the foot of Main Street to the Commercial Slip; the award-winning Whipple Truss foot bridge, which accurately resembles traditional canal spans and connects the Central Wharf to the cobblestone Commercial Street; prominent canal-era buildings, which house various naval and military artifacts; as well as the excavation site of the original Steamship Hotel building foundations, which are presented alongside several interpretive exhibits showcasing the historical significance of the Erie Canal.

=== Canal construction ===
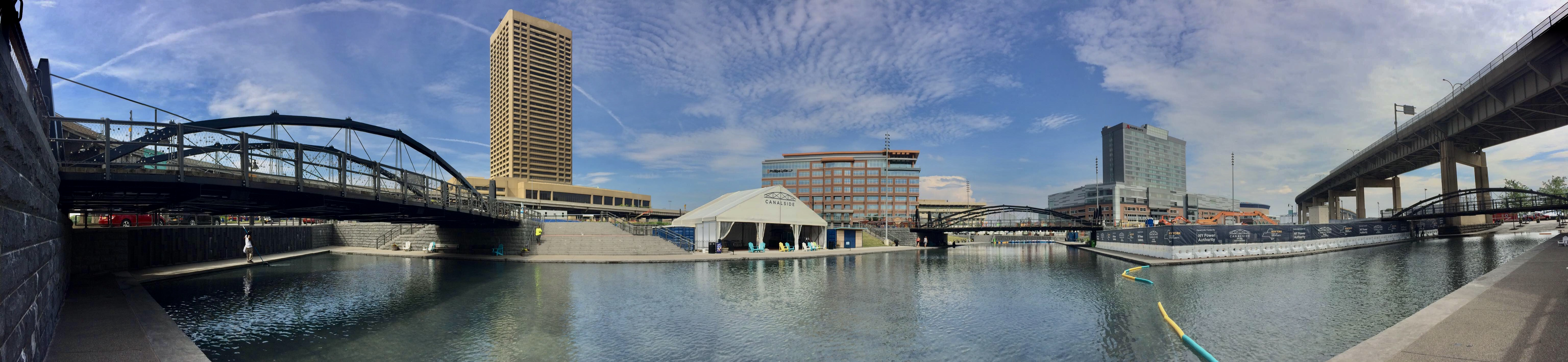
Canalside panorama.

The Erie Canal Harbor Development Corporation planned the overall framework of Canalside for seven years and presented the DGEIS to the public in October 2009. This plan included several amenities that would complement the latter scrapped Bass Pro Shops flagship store.

Canals that function as reflecting pools with a freezing system were built to replicate the historic Erie Canal and Main-Hamburg Canals. The canals were constructed on the old Memorial Auditorium site and were completed in 2014. The canals have water in the spring and summer and ice in the winter for skating and ice biking.

=== Economic development ===
The first major private development in Canalside was the renovation of the Donovan State Office Building, now known as One Canalside. This project consisted of a hotel, restaurant and office space. Construction began in 2012 and was completed by 2014.

The second major development was the Buffalo Sabres' hockey themed LECOM Harborcenter. The development is the most expensive privately funded single building in the history of the City of Buffalo. Construction of the project began in March 2013. The building contains two NHL sized hockey rinks, a parking garage, restaurants, a Marriott hotel and retail space. The building was fully completed in 2015.

On June 24, 2016, Canalside hosted the FanFest for the 2016 NHL Draft which was hosted next door in First Niagara Center.

=== Revitalization ===
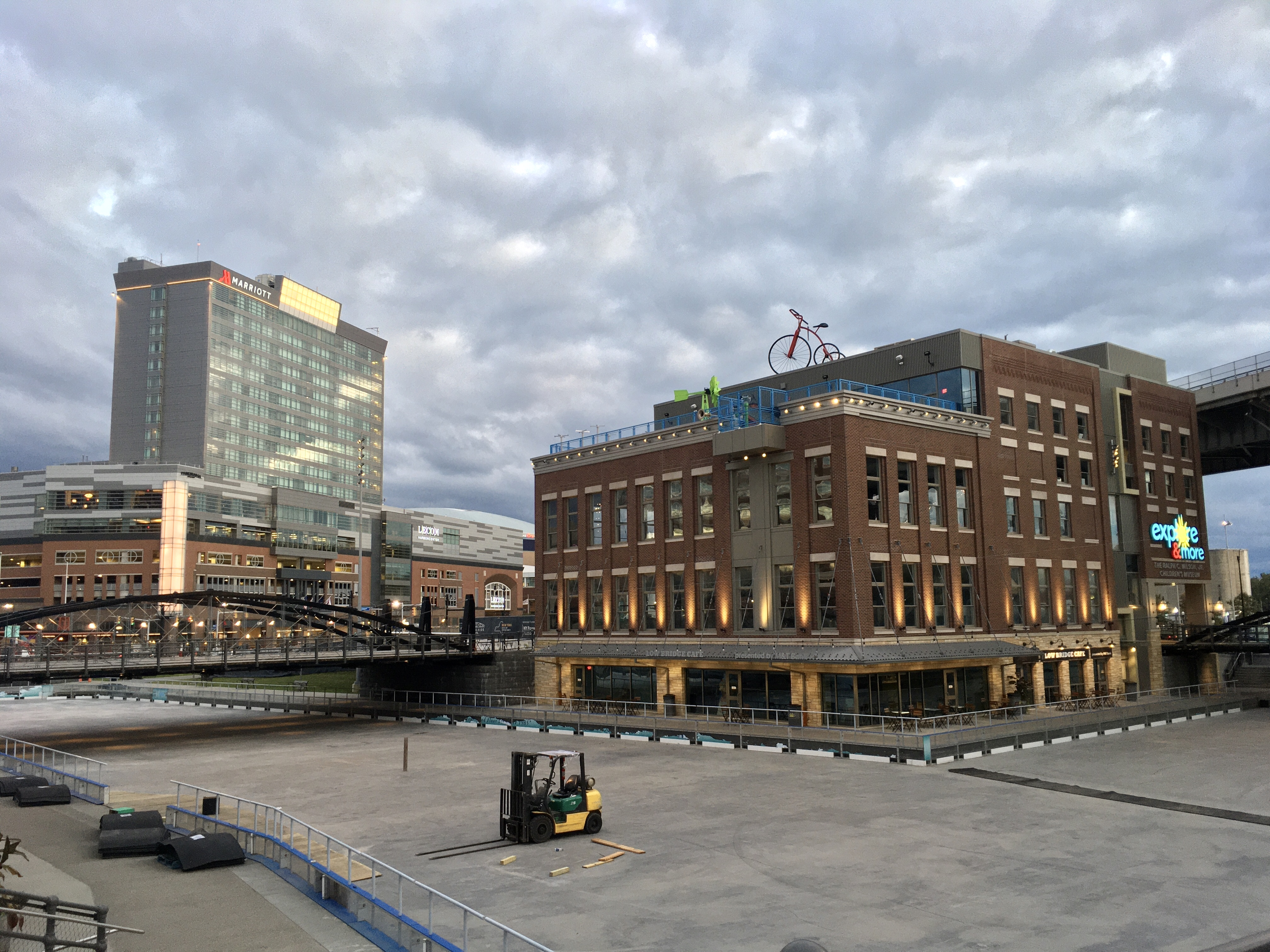
Explore & More Children's Museum

Future plans for Canalside include a pavilion near the commercial slip which will be about 5,000 square feet and be constructed as a masonry-and-steel open structure that recalls a historic 19th-century building. It will have approximately 1,000 square feet of enclosed space for toilets and concessions, as well as an approximately 2,000-square-foot elevated outdoor deck above. The pavilion will have the ability to lengthen Canalside's programming seasons, and house seasonal markets, recurring programming, and private events. Plans also call for a second building called the Union Block Building which will have an approximately 2,800-square-foot one-story ground level that will be fully enclosed and environmentally controlled and an open 1,800-square-foot crawl space at the slip tow path below and an open-air roof of approximately 3,000 square feet partially enclosed on three sides by masonry walls recalling window portals to enable outdoor gathering uses, including observation of Canalside and the waterfront, public programming, private events, and/or interpretive gatherings. Restrooms, visitor information, and public programming spaces are proposed at the ground level.

In 2017, construction began on the Explore & More Children's Museum at Canalside on the South Aud Block. The museum houses a café and museum, retail space, along with four floors of dedicated uses and a rooftop terrace which is open to visitors of all ages. It opened in 2019.

In 2018, the State of New York committed $14 million to two projects at Canalside. $10 million was designated for the recreation of the historic street grid, underground parking and infrastructure within the North Aud Block, and $4 million was earmarked for the creation of "Longshed," an interactive building and exhibit surrounding a replica 19th-century packet boat that sailed on the Erie Canal.

In 2021, a restored vintage 1924 three-row Buffalo Heritage Carousel began operations in a new 6,400-square-foot octagonal-shaped pavilion. It has tall windows, a 13-foot wide walkway around the inside of the roundhouse, and is powered by solar panels on its double-pitched roof that supply enough energy to power the carousel, which were donated by Tesla. Sinatra and Company, a Buffalo-based developer, announced the start of construction of two South Aud Block parcels. Their plans include two 6-story buildings with 71,000-square-feet of retail and office space along with 64 market rate and affordable apartments, with canal access, and are to be the first residences within the district. It is scheduled for completion in June 2026. The Shark Girl sculpture returned to its location, sitting on a rock, after artwork conservation.

== Attractions ==
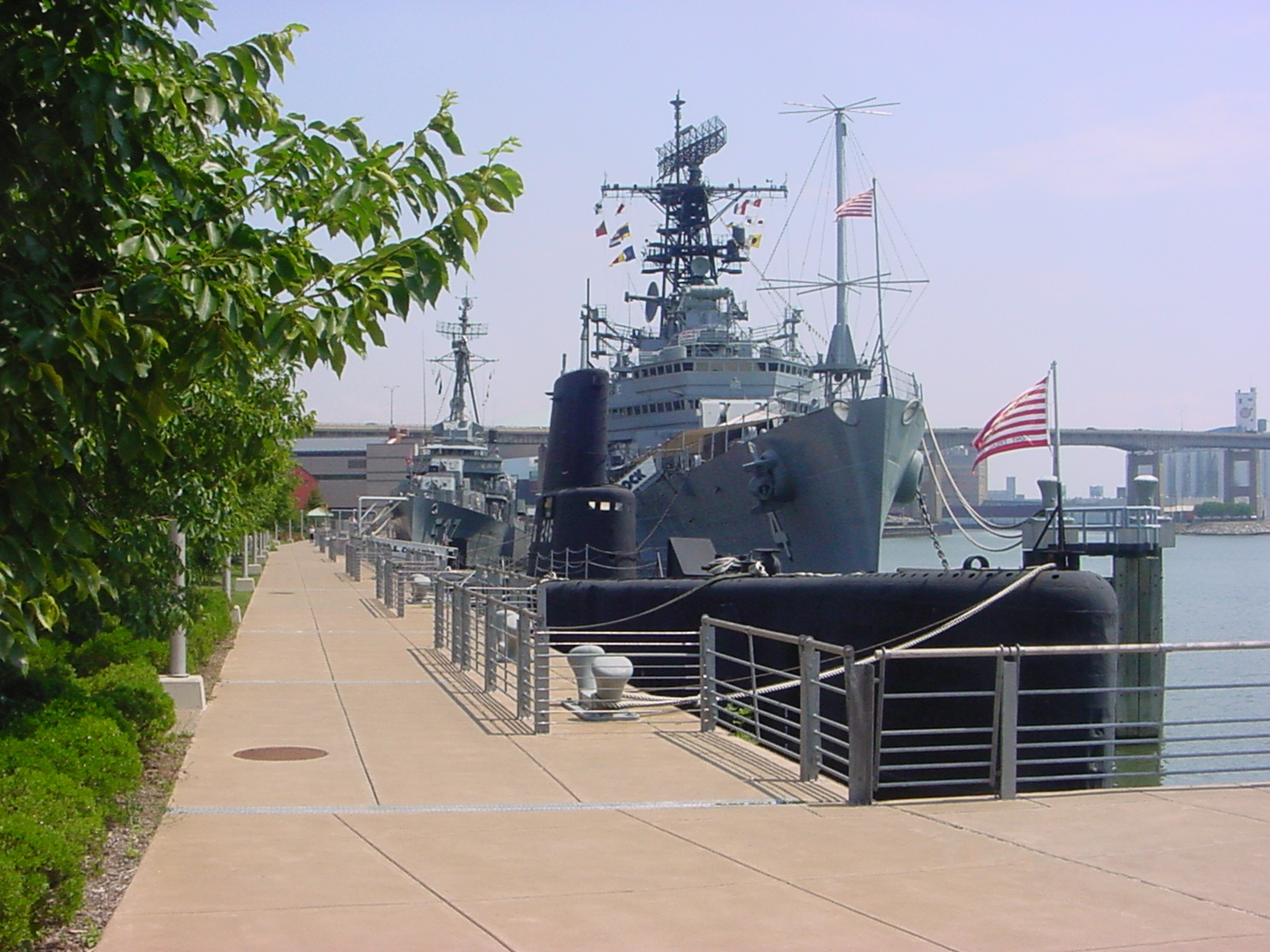
The Buffalo and Erie County Naval & Military Park is one of several attractions located in Buffalo's Canalside District

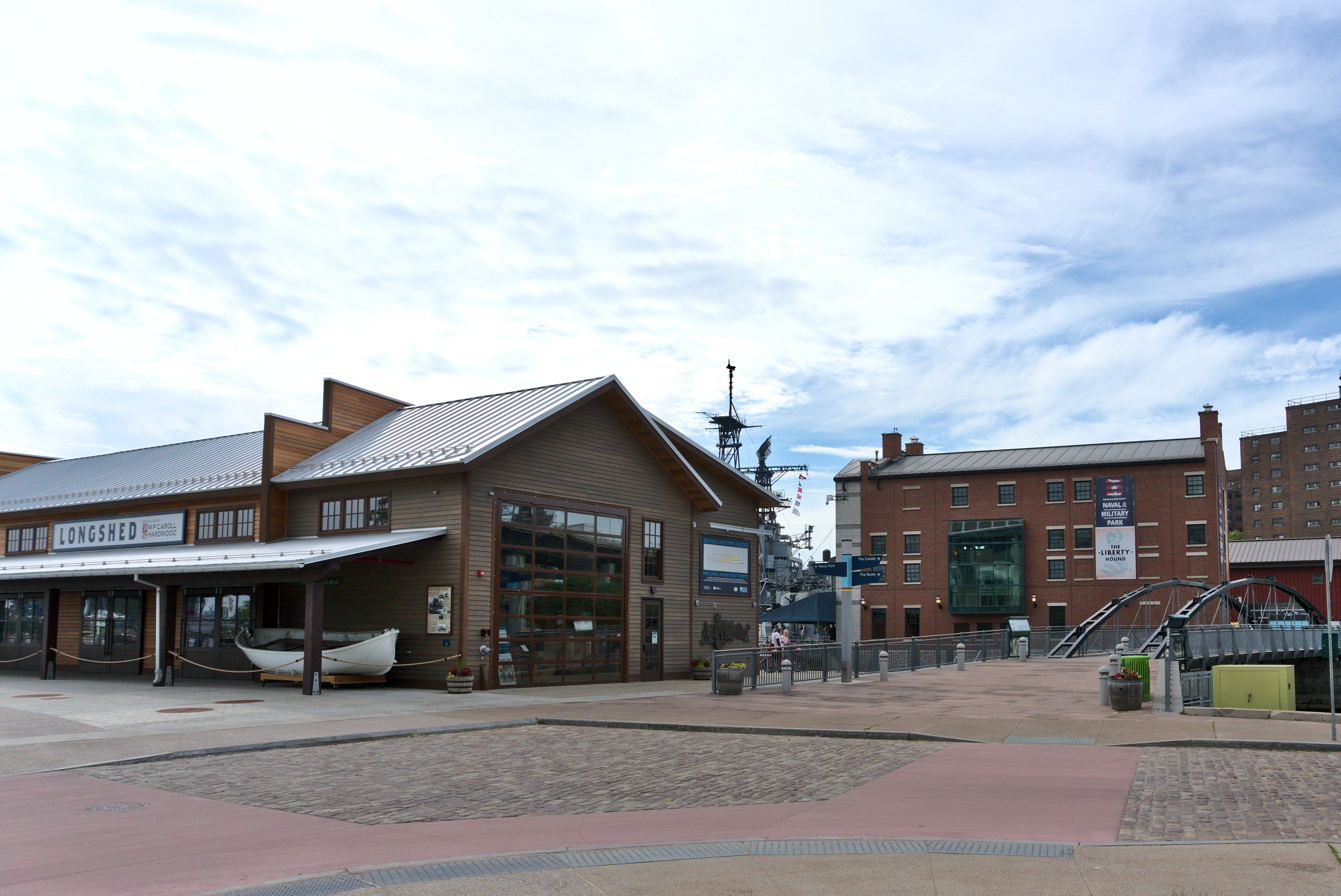
Prime and Lloyd St

=== Museums ===
- Explore & More Children's Museum — opened in 2019
- Buffalo and Erie County Naval & Military Park — opened 1979, reconstructed in 2012

=== Ships ===
- USS The Sullivans (DD-537)—Fletcher-class destroyer
- USS Little Rock (CL-92)—Cleveland-class cruiser; its successor, USS Little Rock (LCS-9) was christened at Canalside in December 2017
- USS Croaker—Gato-class submarine

=== Entertainment venues ===
==== Sports ====
- KeyBank Center (home of the Buffalo Sabres and Buffalo Bandits, formerly known as First Niagara Center, HSBC Arena and Marine Midland Arena)
- The Rinks at LECOM Harborcenter (home of Canisius Golden Griffins men's ice hockey, and the Buffalo Jr. Sabres)

=== Notable architecture ===
- "Shark Girl", Pop art sculpture designed by Casey Riordan Millard

=== Other attractions ===
- The Ice at Canalside—frozen canals in operation as ice rinks in the winter

== Transportation ==
Canalside is served by various modes of transportation, including public transit, intercity rail and several highways. Canalside station of the Buffalo Metro Rail lies directly on Main Street. Amtrak's Buffalo–Exchange Street station is less than a mile to the east, underneath Interstate 190 which forms Canalside's northern border. A bike ferry also provides access to the Buffalo Outer Harbor.

== See also ==
- Buffalo and Erie County Naval & Military Park
- Erie Canal
- LECOM Harborcenter
- Larkinville
- DL&W station
