= Rhine Creek (Iowa) =

Stream in Iowa

Coordinates: 41°42′51″N 91°46′46″W

Rhine Creek is a stream in the U.S. state of Iowa. It is a tributary to Clear Creek.

Rhine Creek was so named on account of heavy German settlement near its course.
