= Saville Covered Bridge =

Covered bridge in Pennsylvania, US

- U.S. National Register of Historic Places
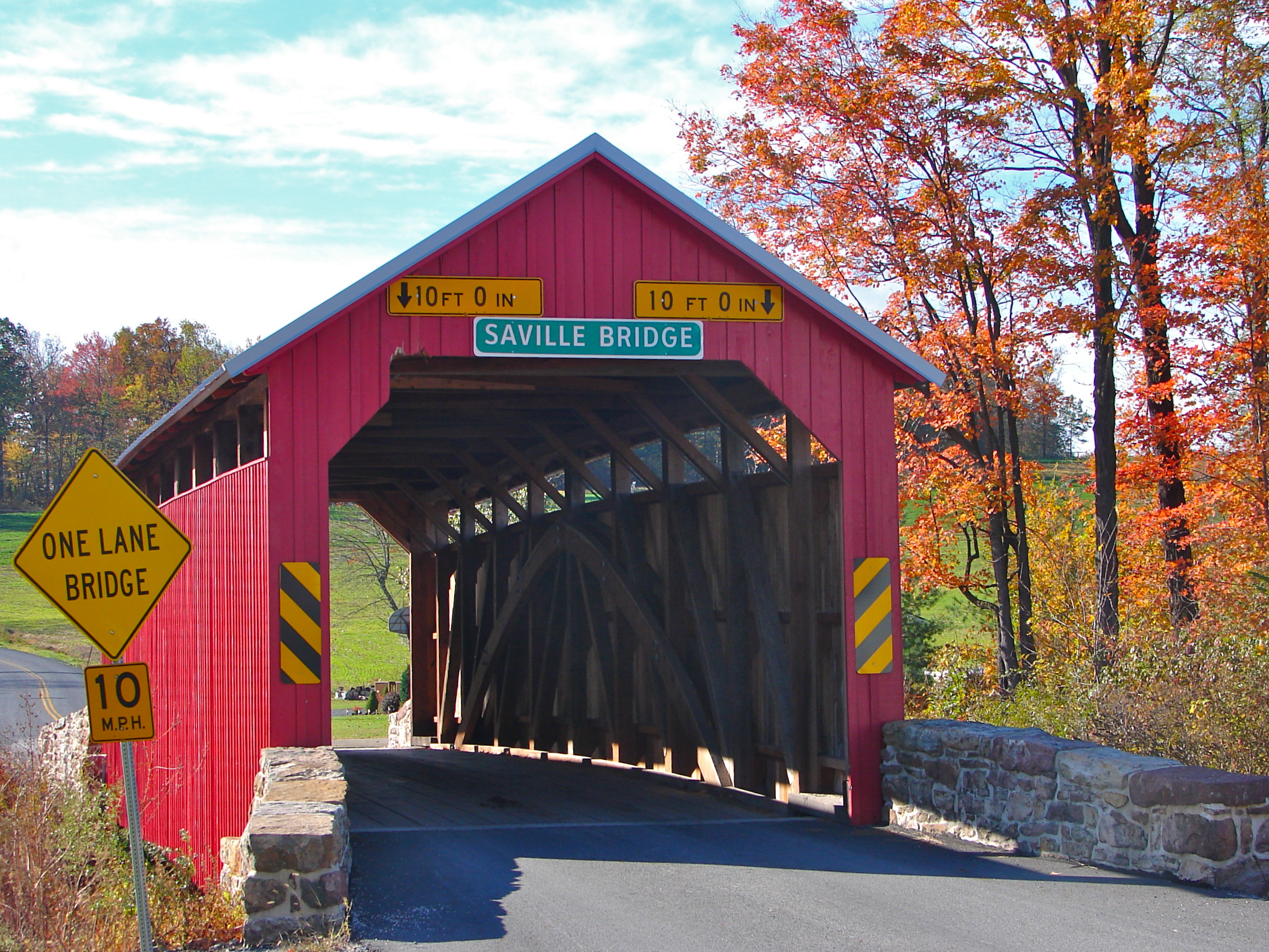
- Saville Covered Bridge, October 2010

- Location within Pennsylvania Location within the United States
- Location: Legislative Route 50037, Saville Township, Perry County, Pennsylvania, U.S.
- Coordinates: 40°26′17″N 77°23′47″W
- Area: 0.1 acres (0.040 ha)
- Built: 1903
- Architect: Wentzel, L.M.
- Architectural style: Burr
- MPS: Covered Bridges of Adams, Cumberland, and Perry Counties TR
- NRHP reference No.: 80003603
- Added to NRHP: August 25, 1980

The Saville Covered Bridge is a historic wooden covered bridge located at Saville Township in Perry County, Pennsylvania. It is a 60-foot-long (18 m) Burr Truss bridge, constructed about 1903. It crosses Big Buffalo Creek.

It was listed on the National Register of Historic Places in 1980.

== Gallery ==
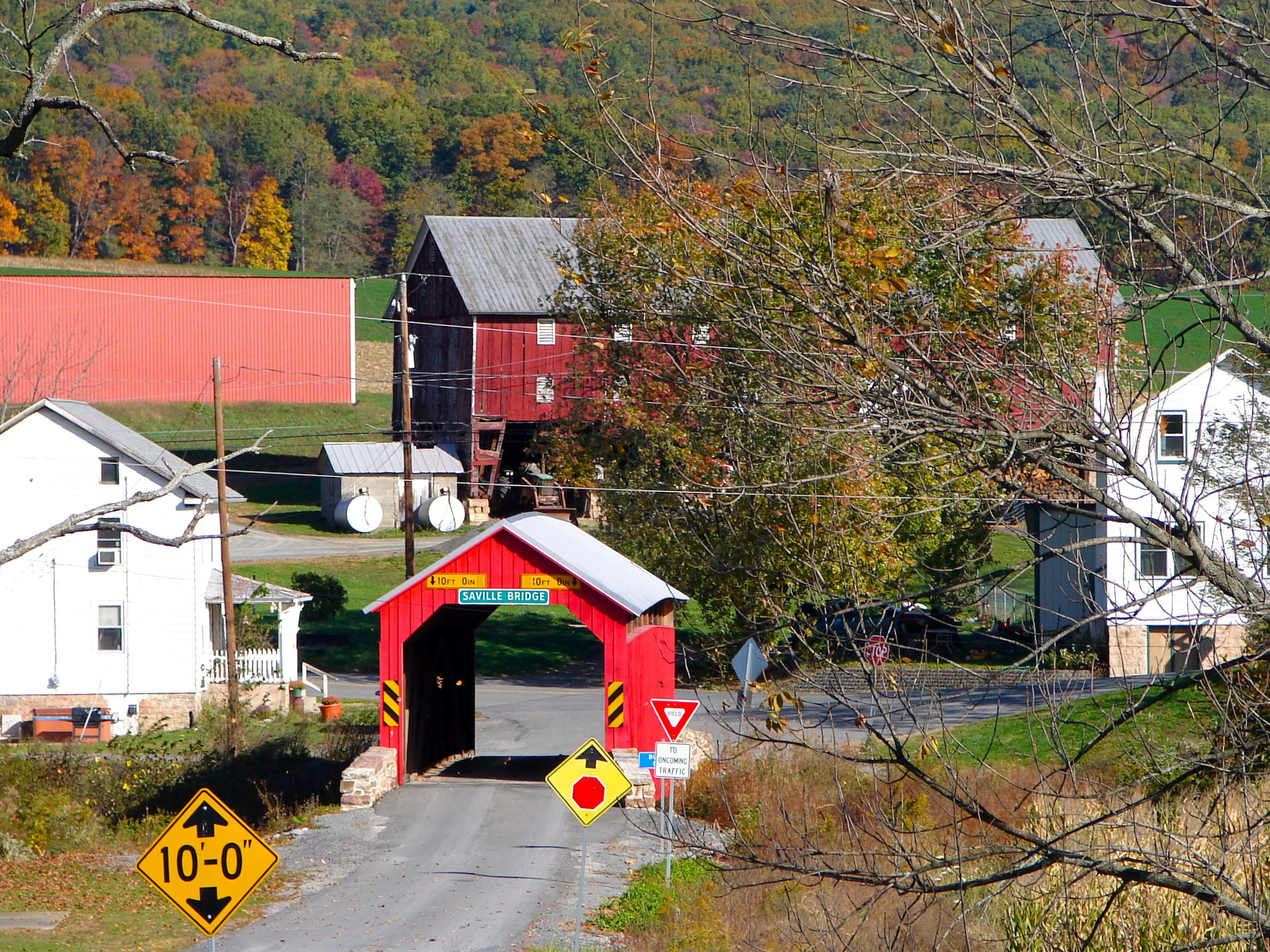
Southern view of the bridge and the hamlet of Saville.

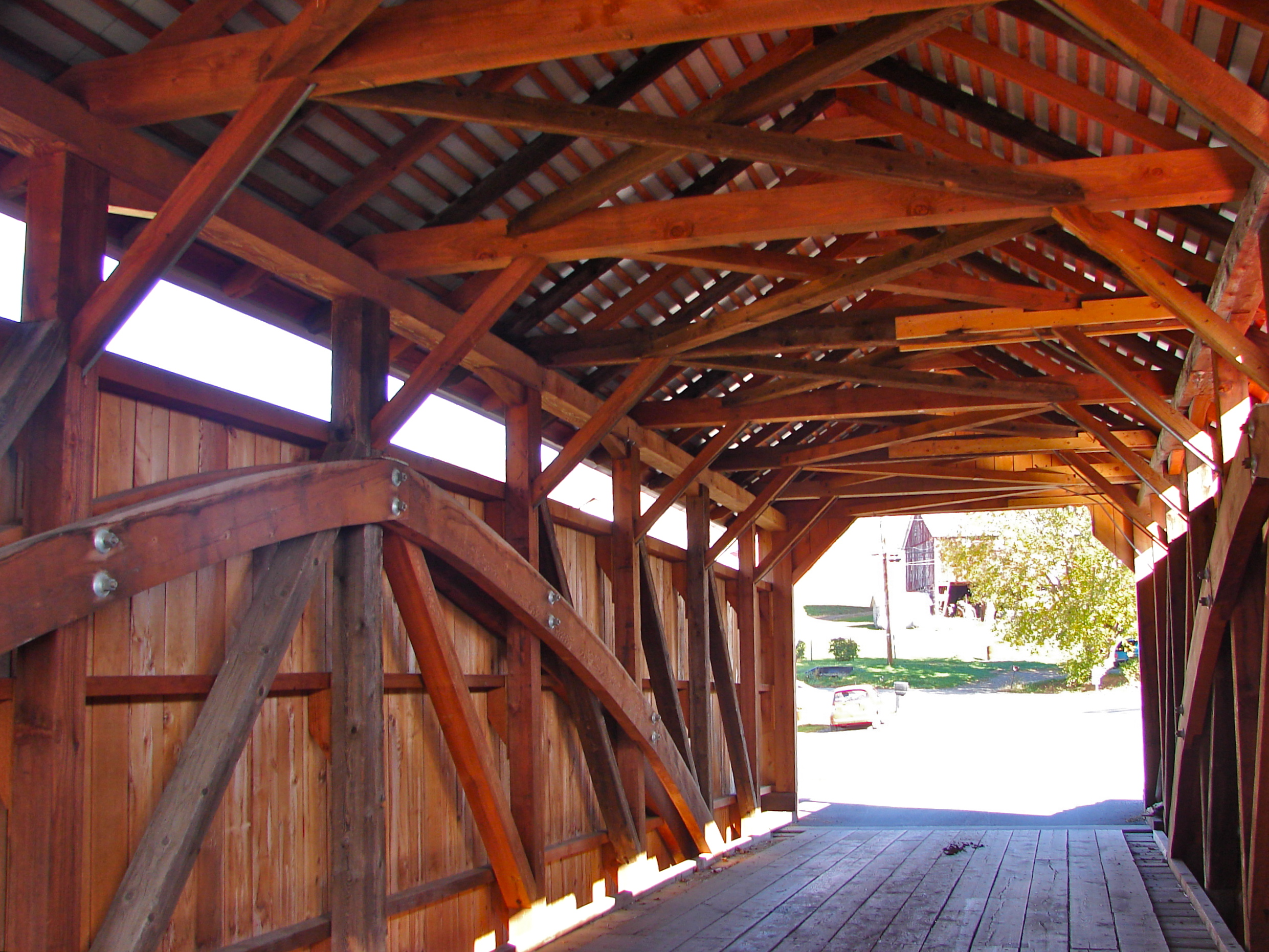
Interior of the bridge showing the Burr arch.
