= Hickory Creek (Buffalo Creek tributary) =

- Location in Arkansas

Location
- Country: United States
- State: Arkansas
- County: Polk County

Physical characteristics
- Source
  - location: Polk County, Arkansas, United States
  - coordinates: 34°21′20″N 94°22′37″W
- Mouth
  - location: Polk County, Arkansas, United States
  - coordinates: 34°23′50″N 94°27′32″W
  - elevation: 869 ft (265 m)

Basin features
- Tributaries
  - left: Indian Creek
  - right: Little Hickory Creek

Hickory Creek is a tributary of Buffalo Creek in western Polk County, Arkansas, in the United States. The stream headwaters arise adjacent to US Route 59 approximately 0.6 miles southwest of Vandervoort and it flows to the northwest for a linear distance of approximately six miles to its confluence with Buffalo Creek one third of a mile from the Arkansas-Oklahoma border.
