= Stanley Spisiak =

American Jeweler and conservationist (1916-1996)

- Born: Stanley Peter Spisiak; April 20, 1916; Buffalo, New York, USA
- Died: August 11, 1996 (aged 80); Amherst, New York, USA
- Resting place: Forest Lawn Cemetery, Buffalo, New York
- Occupation: Jeweler
- Spouse: Emily S. Szynski
- Parent(s): Peter and Rosalina (Paczyna) Spisiak
- Awards: Water Conservationist of the Year

Stanley Peter Spisiak (April 20, 1916 – August 11, 1996) was an American jeweler, conservationist and environmental activist. A native of Buffalo, New York, he was known as Mister Conservation and Mister Buffalo River. He was chairman of the Water Resources Committee of the New York State Conservation Council and recipient of the presidential "Water Saver of the Nation" award. He fought for the cleanup of the Buffalo River, the Niagara River and Lake Erie.

== Early life and career ==
Spisiak was born in Buffalo, New York to Peter and Rosaline Spisiak on April 20, 1916. He was the youngest of 16 children. His parents were Polish immigrants who had come to America in 1907. His father died in 1923 when Spisiak was seven years old. His mother died in 1932 making him an orphan at age 16.

He spent a year in the Civilian Conservation Corps (CCC) then worked at the Buffalo Museum of Science where he learned the art of gemology. With a small loan from a bank he established his jewelry store on Buffalo’s East Side, Kaisertown, where he operated successfully for nearly 40 years.

== Conservation ==
From a very early age, Spisiak was interested in conservation and protecting the environment. As a youth he swam at Woodlawn Beach where he witnessed the dredging of the sand by the US Army Corps of Engineers from the beach which was destroying the fish spawning grounds. He was able to convince the state legislature to pass a bill to put an end to the dredging. He became an expert in water chemistry and fishery biology, teaching others and serving as president of several sportsmen’s clubs. He also became active in the New York State Conservation Counsel.

After serving in the Civil Air Patrol during World War II, he intensified his efforts to bring attention to the hazardous wastes and contaminants being dumped in the waters of the Niagara Frontier. He frequently spent hours on the banks of the Buffalo River, witnessing its demise due to the oil and petroleum waste and a multitude of complex chemicals accumulating in the river. He eventually attracted the attention of the local news media who began to report on his campaign to protect the wildlife and the environment.

Shortly after Robert Kennedy took office as a US Senator from New York State, he took an interest in Spisiak’s activities. Kennedy assigned one of his “Boiler Room Girls”, Mary Jo Kopechne to assist Spisiak whenever he was in Washington to do research. On June 17, 1965, Spisiak took Kennedy and Buffalo Congressman Max McCarthy on a boat tour of the river resulting in Kennedy’s commitment to support cleanup efforts.

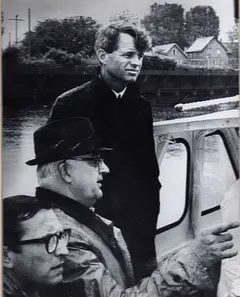
Robert Kennedy with Congressman Max McCarthy and Stanley Spisiak on the Buffalo, NY River

In addition to the US Army Corps of Engineers, in Spisiak’s opinion, two other egregious polluters were Socony-Vacuum and Republic Steel. In 1965, in testimony before the Federal Water Pollution Control Administration, he criticized New York State officials failing to take action against these businesses. The conference resulted in several recommendations to save Lake Erie including a mandate that the US Army Corps of Engineers develop and implement a program to safely dispose of materials drudged from 15 ports in Lake Erie.

Spisiak was named the national water conservationist of the year by the National Wildlife Federation. The award was presented to him at a dinner in Washington D.C. in January 1966. At that dinner he was seated next to Lady Bird Johnson who was a lifelong advocate for beautifying the nation’s cities and highways. He invited her to visit Buffalo for a personal tour of the Buffalo River. She accepted the invitation and arrived in Buffalo on August 19, 1965, along with her husband, President Lyndon B. Johnson. During the tour Spisiak showed President Johnson a bucket of sludge that had been taken from the Buffalo River. He told LBJ; "They're dumping 175,000 cubic yards of this slop right out in the lake every year from the Buffalo River. They're dumping 4.5 million cubic yards every year from 15 ports.
LBJ asked: "Who's they?"
Spisiak replied: "The U.S. Corps of Engineers"
LBJ: "Why, those bastards!"
Lady Bird: "Oh, Lyndon, we mustn't let this continue"
LBJ: "Don't worry, I'll take care of it"

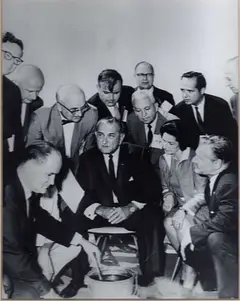
Stanley Spisiak shows President Lyndon Johnson pollution from the Buffalo River

Two weeks later, President Johnson signed an Executive Order banning open-water placement of polluted dredged sediment in Lake Erie, a restriction that endures to this day. Over the next few years, the Corps of Engineers embarked on an ambitious program to build "Confined Disposal Facilities" throughout the Great Lakes to safely contain polluted sediment dredged from waterways.

The previous month Spisiak had testified in Washington, D.C. at a hearing held by a US House of Representatives Subcommittee on Natural Resources and Power. There he made several recommendations including Federal legislation to stop the discharge of toxic and deadly materials into any stream, body of water or municipal sewage lines at their source, publish the names of manufactures who refuse to cooperate and to imprison offenders convicted of bribes or other acts which caused their polluting activities to be overlooked.

In spite of Spisiak's efforts, progress on the clean up of the Buffalo River was slow. On January 24, 1968 an oil slick on the river caught fire and flames nearly 30 feet high destroyed much of the substructure of a nearby bridge.

In 1969, at a hearing in Dunkirk, NY, Spisiak spoke out against further drilling for oil in Lake Erie.

There was only so much that Spisiak could do. The Buffalo River was declared biologically dead in 1969.

== Aftermath and Legacy ==
Stanley Spisiak is credited for being the savior of Lake Erie and the Buffalo area tributaries. By 1974 smallmouth bass and coho began to reappear in the Buffalo River. By 2018 the River has become a popular destination for kayakers and recreational boaters.

Buffalo Niagara Waterkeeper, an organization dedicated to the protection and restoration of waterways and surrounding ecosystems in Western New York, and an affiliate of Waterkeeper Alliance, named its Legacy Society of major donors in honor of Spisiak.

== Personal life ==
Stanley Spisiak married Emily S. Szynski in 1936. She died in 1995. They had one child, a son, Jon Stanley Spisiak (1937-2020). Stanley and Emily Spisiak are buried in Forest Lawn Cemetery, Buffalo, NY.
