= Horse Hollow (Ripley County, Missouri) =

Valley in Missouri, United States

Horse Hollow is a valley in Ripley County in the U.S. state of Missouri.

The stream headwaters are at 36°44′23″N 90°58′59″W and its confluence with Buffalo Creek is at 36°43′18″N 90°58′11″W.

Horse Hollow most likely was named for horses employed in the local lumber industry.
