= Buffalo Creek (Clear Creek tributary) =

Stream in Johnson County, Iowa, U.S.

Coordinates: 41°42′30″N 91°42′35″W

Buffalo Creek is a stream in Johnson County, Iowa, United States. It is a tributary to Clear Creek.

Buffalo Creek was so named on account of the buffalo (American bison) which once roamed the area.
