= Explore & More Children's Museum =

Coordinates: 42°52′40.4″N 78°52′41.1″W

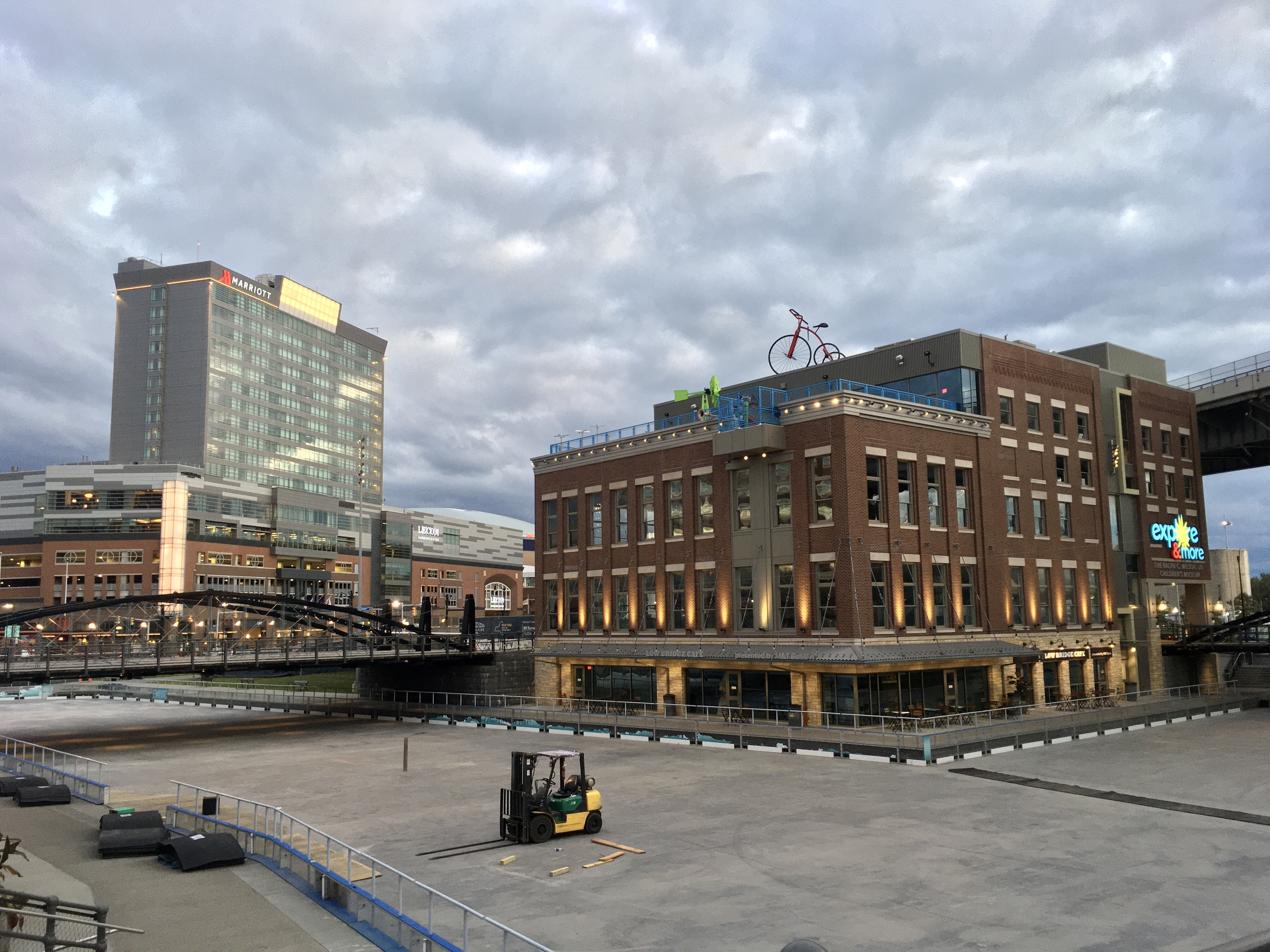
View of the museum

Explore & More - The Ralph C. Wilson, Jr. Children's Museum is a museum in Buffalo, New York. The museum is for and about Buffalo - with seven play zones and three educational studios that are used to tell the unique story of Western New York. Designed for children from toddlers to third grade, these hands-on play zones encourage children to explore their interests through the power of play. It was founded in 1994 in East Aurora, New York. In 2019, the museum moved from East Aurora to the Canalside district of Buffalo. Many of the former exhibits from the East Aurora location were donated to the Children's Activity Corner of Jamestown. On February 14, 2018, the Ralph C. Wilson Jr. Foundation awarded a $6 million grant to the museum and the then-under construction Canalside museum was re-named in honor of Wilson.

The museum is located at 130 Main St. Buffalo, NY 14202.

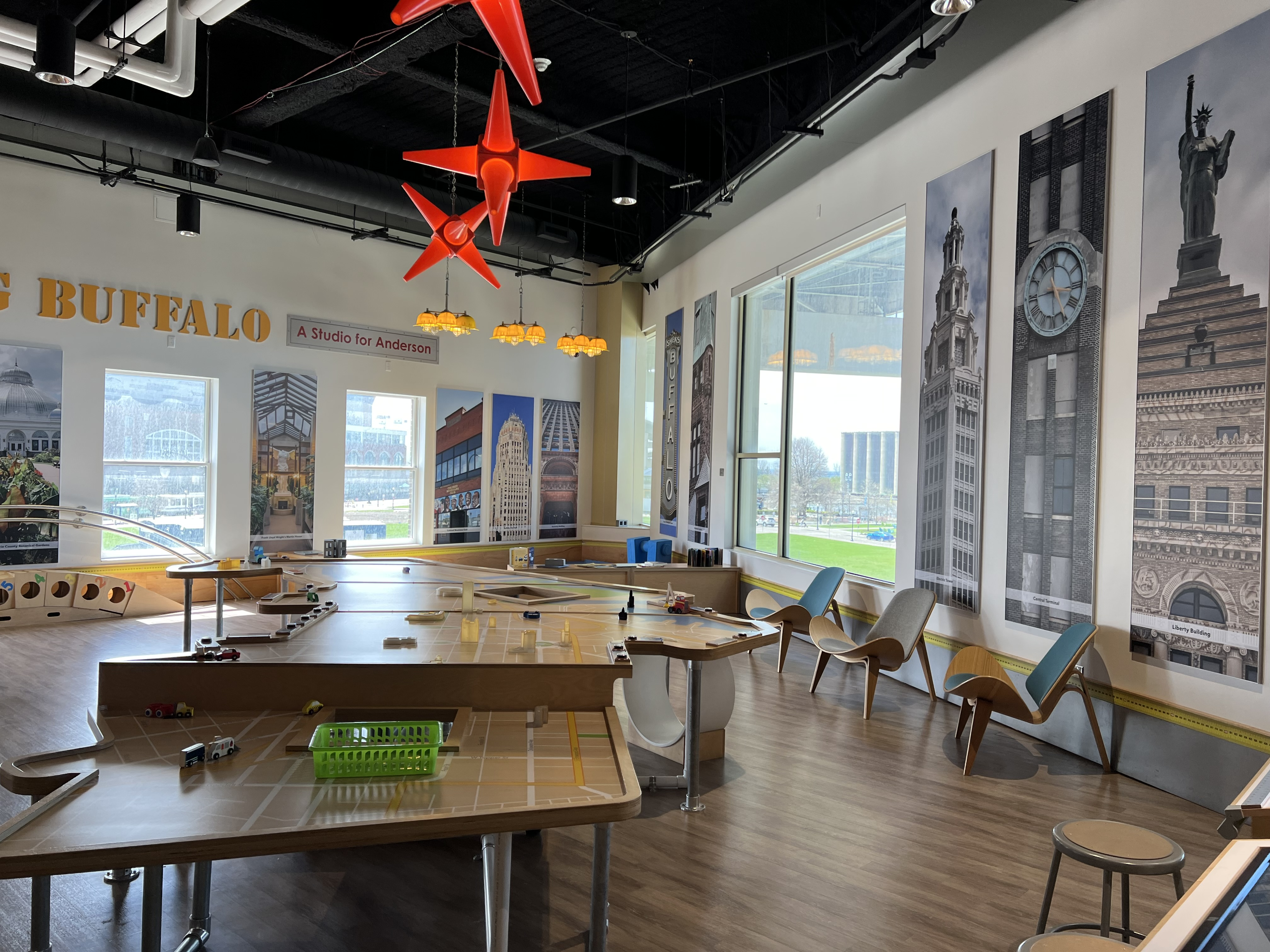
Building Buffalo

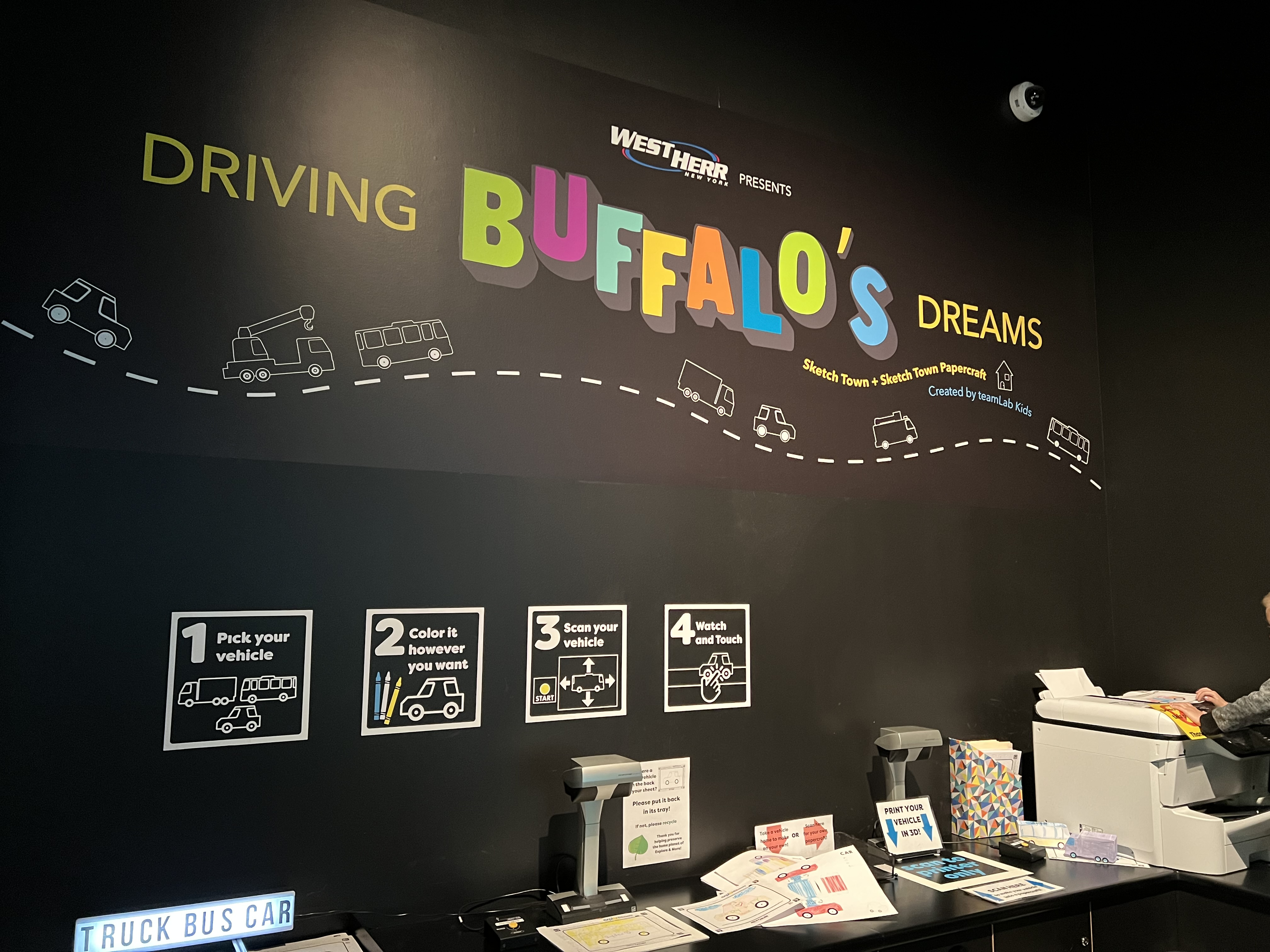
Driving Buffalo's Dreams

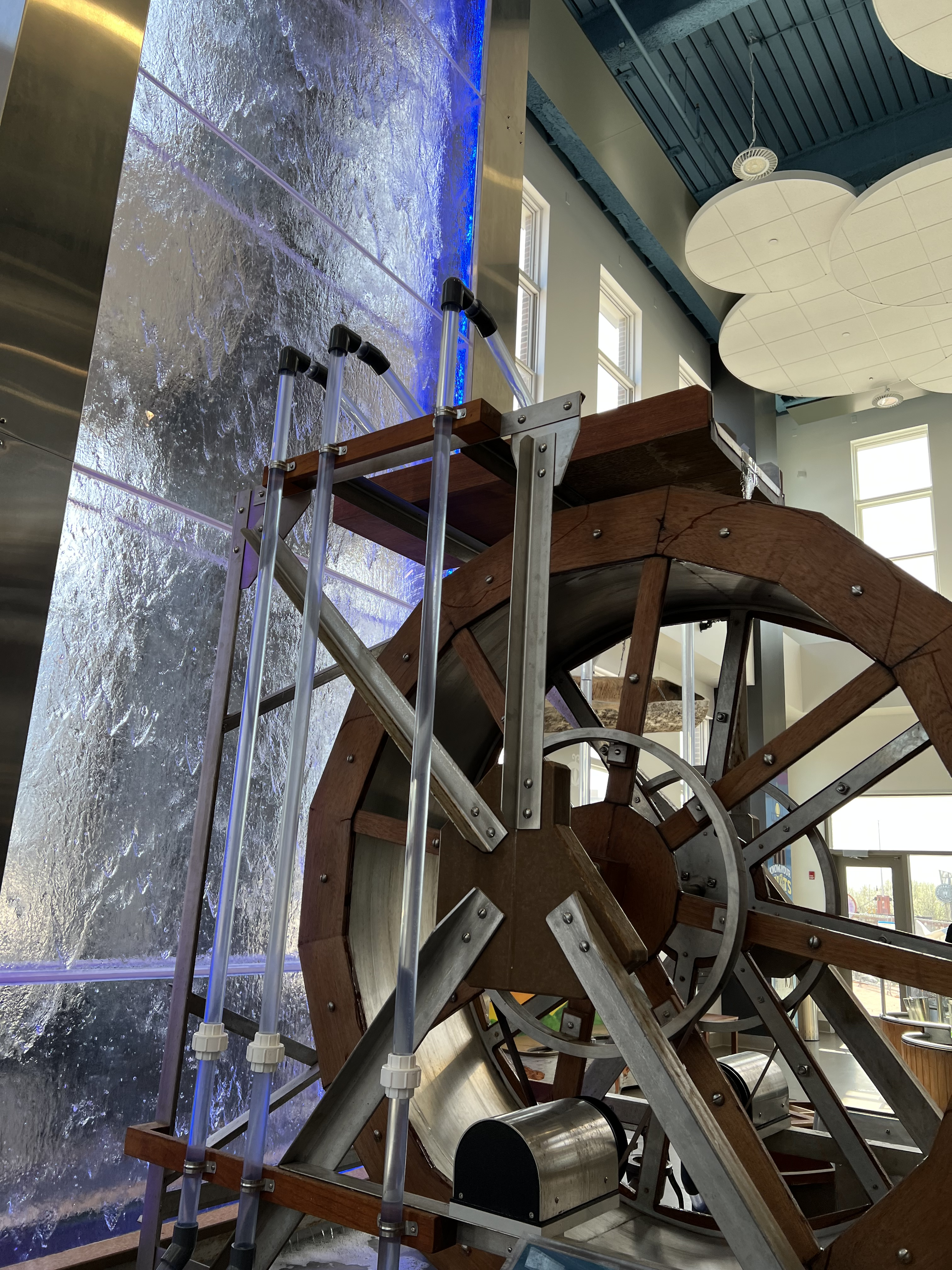
Waterwheel

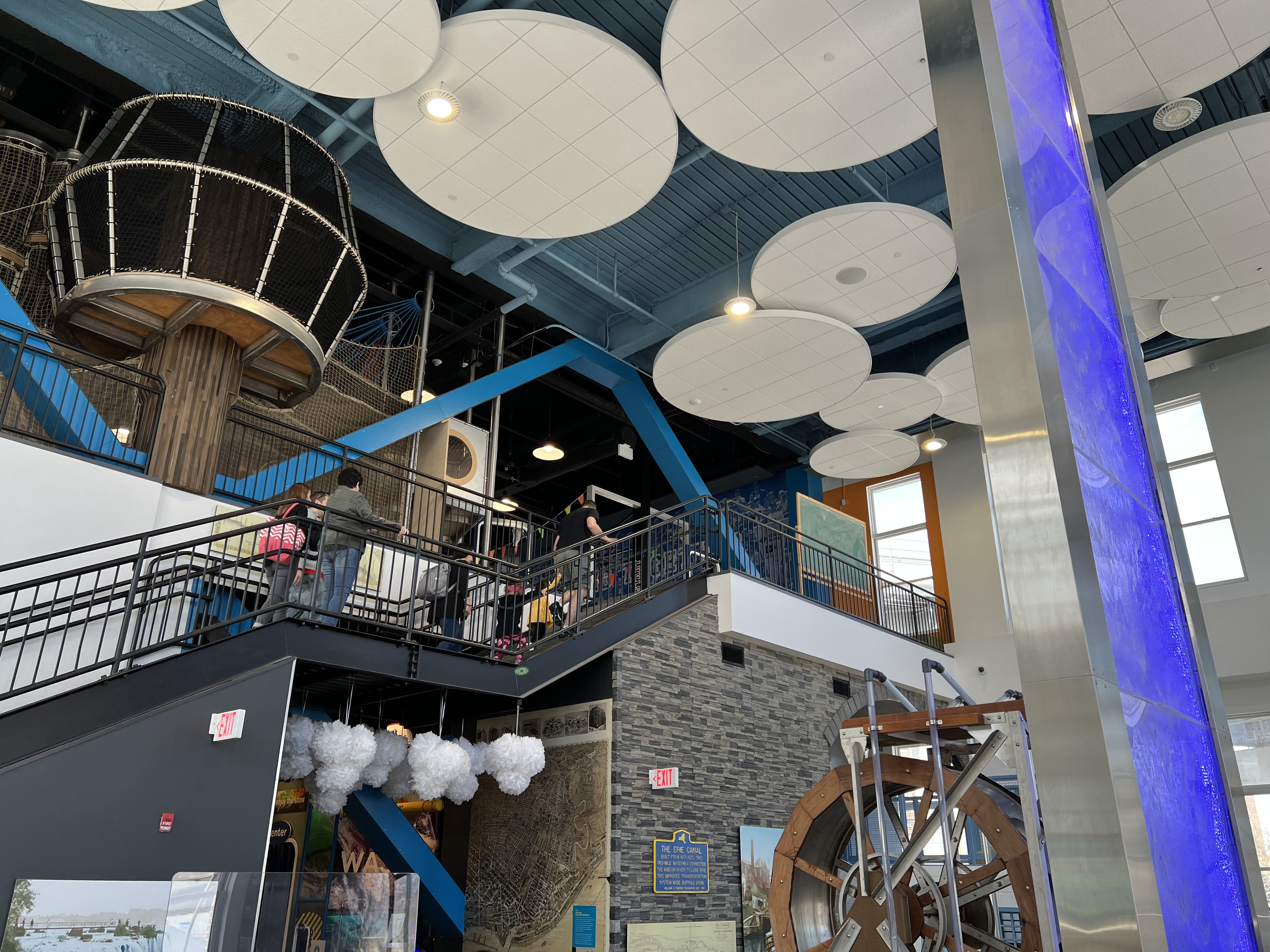
Stairway to third floor

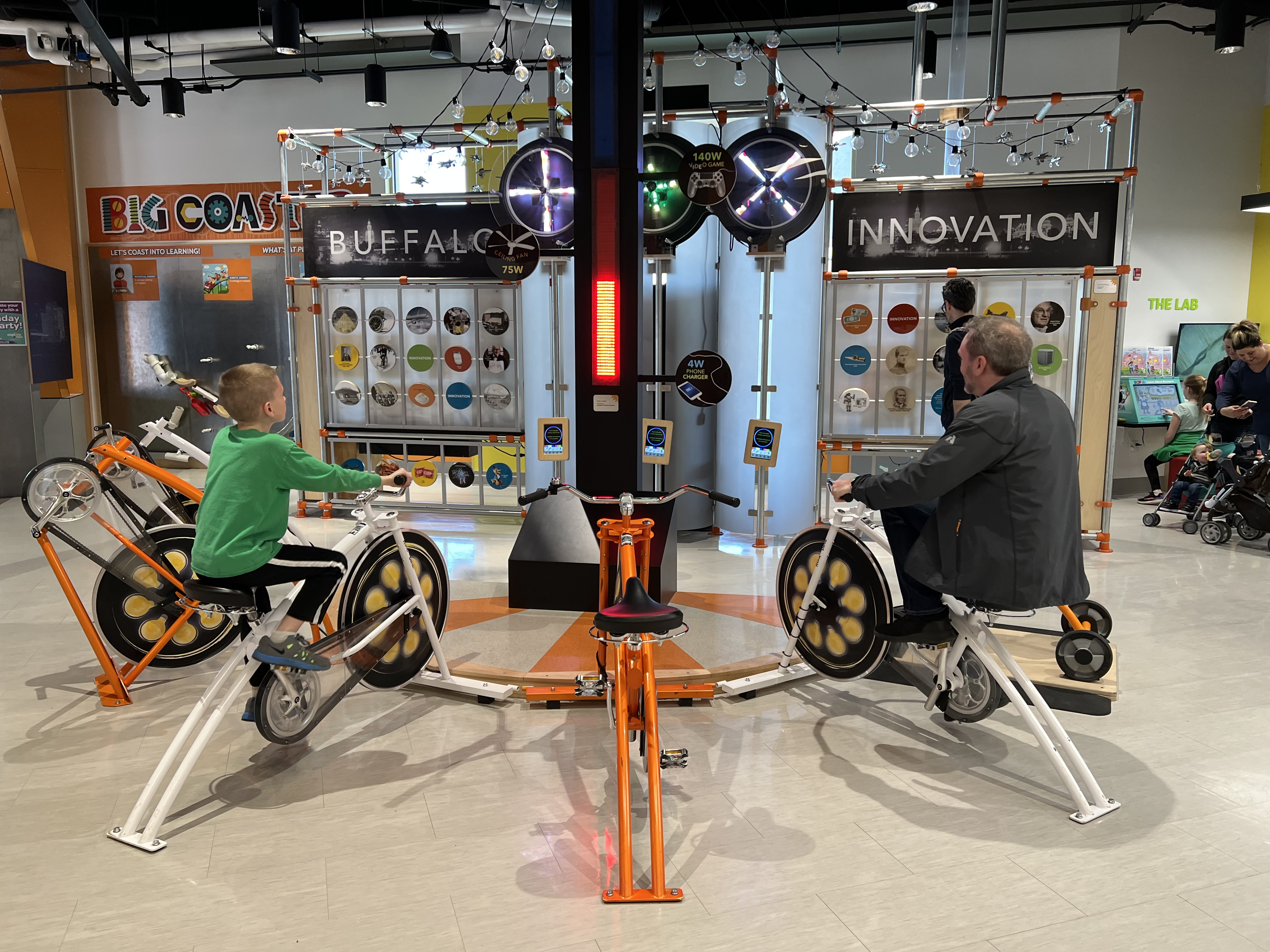
Spinnovation
