= Ickesburg, Pennsylvania =

Unincorporated community in Pennsylvania, US

Ickesburg
- Census-designated place
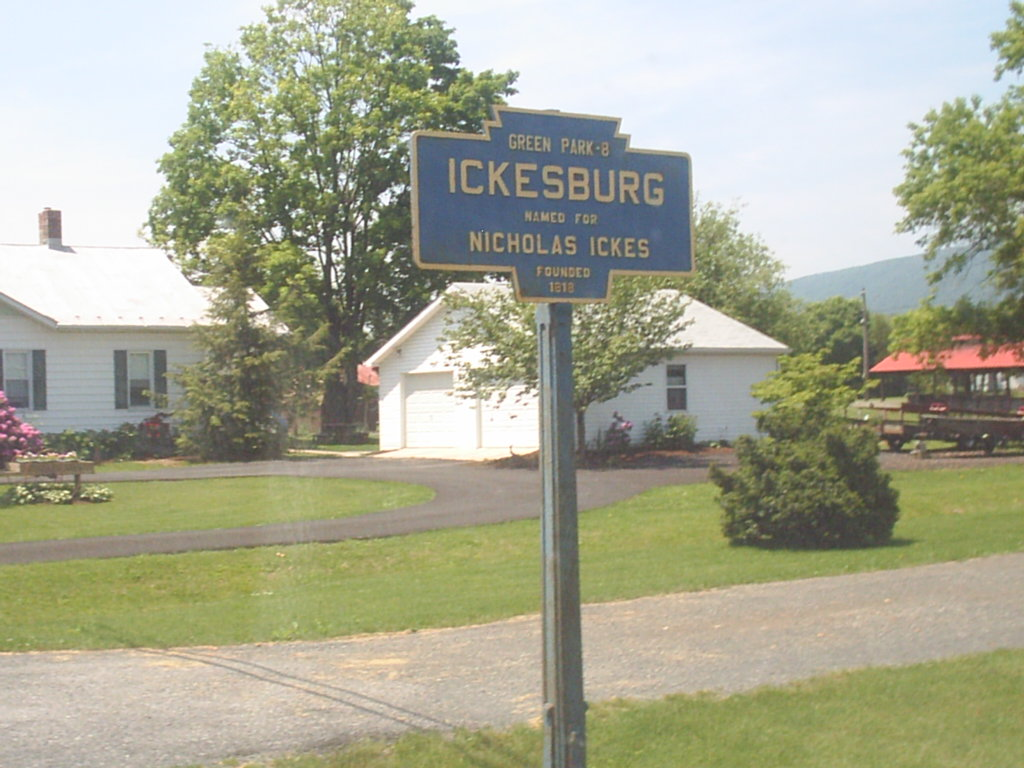
- Keystone Marker

- Location of Ickesburg in Pennsylvania
- Coordinates: 40°27′21.6″N 77°21′7.2″W
- Country: United States
- State: Pennsylvania
- County: Perry
- Township: Saville

Area
  - Total: 0.412 sq mi (1.07 km^{2})
  - Land: 0.409 sq mi (1.06 km^{2})
  - Water: 0.003 sq mi (0.0078 km^{2})
- Elevation: 637 ft (194 m)
- GNIS feature ID: 2830809

Ickesburg is a census-designated place in Saville Township, Perry County, Pennsylvania, United States at the junction of Routes 17 and 74. It is located on the Panther Creek, which flows into the Buffalo Creek, a tributary of the Juniata River. Its ZIP code is 17037 and it is served by area codes 717 and 223.

== Demographics ==
Historical population
Census	Pop.	Note	%±

The United States Census Bureau defined Ickesburg as a census designated place (CDP) in 2023.
