= Buffalo Creek (Crow Wing County, Minnesota) =

Stream in Crow Wing County, Minnesota, U.S.

Coordinates: 46°19′22″N 94°14′48″W

Buffalo Creek is a stream in Crow Wing County, in the U.S. state of Minnesota.

Buffalo Creek was named for the American bison (buffalo) seen there by early settlers.

== See also ==
- List of rivers of Minnesota
