= Whitewater Creek (Flint River tributary) =

Stream in Georgia, U.S.

Coordinates: 32°20′38.56″N 84°2′33.67″W

Whitewater Creek is a stream in the U.S. state of Georgia. It is a tributary to the Flint River.

The name sometimes is spelled out as "White Water Creek". "Whitewater" is an accurate preservation of its native American Indian name Okauhutkee.
