= Rhine Creek (Minnesota) =

- Location of mouth

Location
- Country: United States
- State: Minnesota
- County: Pine

Physical characteristics
- Mouth
  - coordinates: 46°14′54″N 92°59′12″W

Rhine Creek is a stream in the U.S. state of Minnesota.

The name may be a corruption of Ryan Creek, an earlier name appearing on maps.

== See also ==
- List of rivers of Minnesota
