= Buffalo Creek (Dewey County, South Dakota) =

Stream in South Dakota, USA

Coordinates: 45°12′39″N 100°20′31″W

Buffalo Creek is a stream in the U.S. state of South Dakota.

A variant name was Buffalo Skin Creek. The stream's name comes from the Sioux Indians of the area, after the buffalo they hunted.

== See also ==
- List of rivers of South Dakota
