= Buffalo River State Park =

Buffalo River State Park may refer to:

- Buffalo River State Park (Arkansas)
- Buffalo River State Park (Minnesota)
