= Buffalo Creek (Harding County, South Dakota) =

Stream in South Dakota, U.S.

Coordinates: 45°31′39″N 103°27′40″W

Buffalo Creek is a stream in the U.S. state of South Dakota.

Buffalo Creek was named for the fact buffalo meat was dried near it.

== See also ==
- List of rivers of South Dakota
