= Buffalo River (New York) =

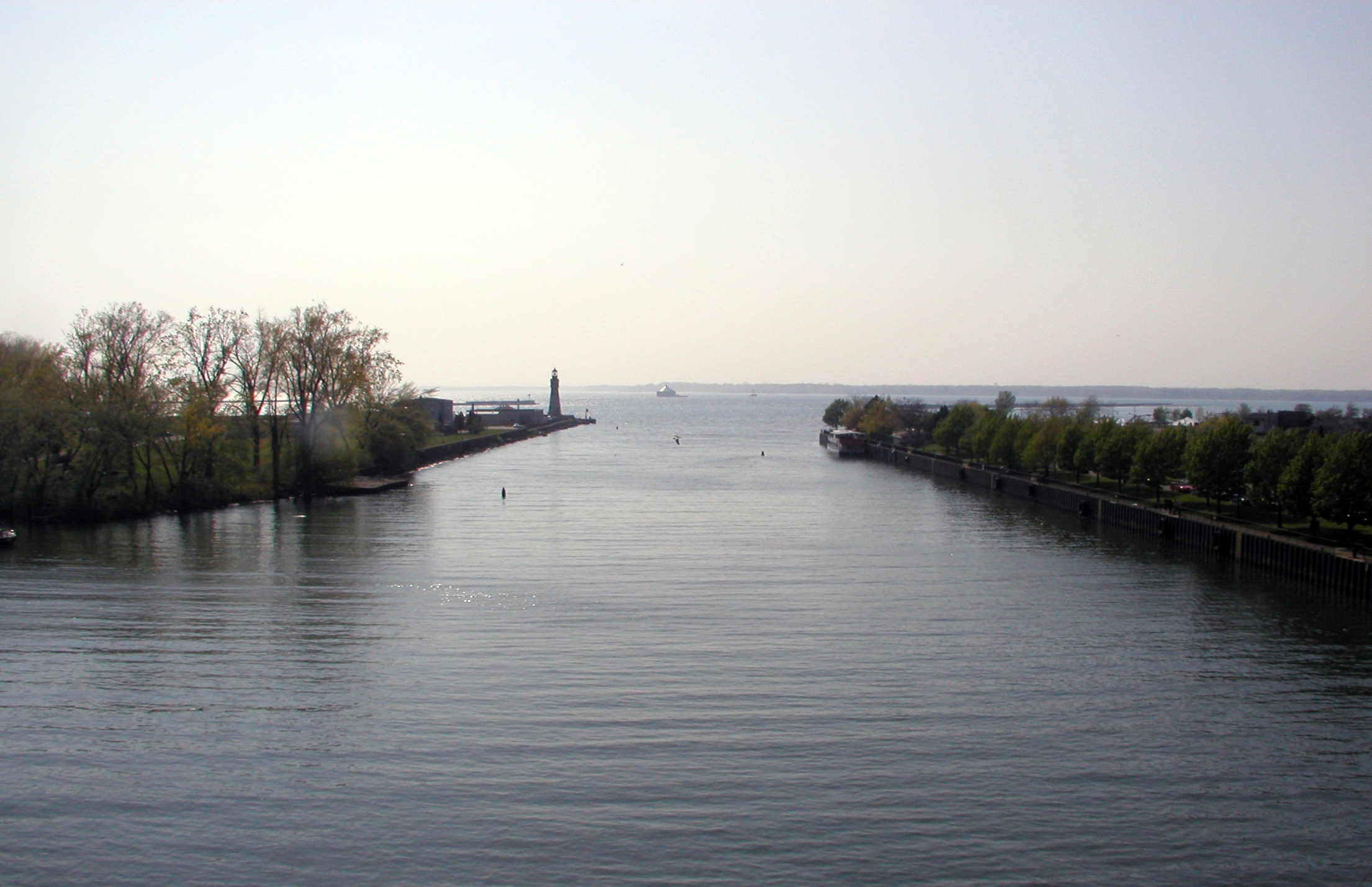
- Buffalo River where it empties into Lake Erie. The lighthouse on the left of the river is the Buffalo Main Light

Location
- Country: United States
- State: New York
- Counties: Erie, Wyoming
- City: Buffalo

Physical characteristics
- Source
  - coordinates: 42°35′38″N 78°28′15″W
  - elevation: 1,450 ft (440 m)
- Mouth: Lake Erie
  - location: Buffalo
  - coordinates: 42°52′42″N 78°53′11″W
  - elevation: 570 ft (170 m)
- Length: 8 mi (13 km) approximately
- Basin size: 447 mi^{2} (1,160 km^{2}) total watershed
- Discharge
  - location: Buffalo, NY

Basin features
- Tributaries
  - left: Cayuga Creek
  - right: Buffalo Creek (New York), Cazenovia Creek

The Buffalo River drains a 447-square-mile (1,160 km^{2}) watershed in Western New York state, emptying into the eastern end of Lake Erie at the City of Buffalo. The river has three tributaries: Cayuga Creek, Buffalo Creek, and Cazenovia Creek.

The Buffalo River has been important to the development of western New York, including as the terminus for the Erie Canal beginning in 1825, and later as an industrial area with uses including grain elevators, steel mills and chemical production. When shipping began to bypass the Erie Canal in the 1950s, and later heavy industry declined, the transportation and industrial uses of the river were greatly reduced. Many adjacent factories and grain mills were abandoned. The river and adjacent sites have been the focus of efforts over several decades to improve water quality and restore habitat, most recently in 2011 with the commencement of the Buffalo River Restoration Project.

== Geography ==
The Buffalo River flows eastward from the point of confluence, passing through residential and heavily industrialized parts of the city. The river includes a 6.2-mile (10.0 km) federal navigation channel maintained by the United States Army Corps of Engineers at a depth of 23 feet (7.0 m) below lake level (along with an additional 1.4 miles [2.3 km] of the City Ship Canal). Because of this designation, bridges in the navigable part of the river are required to allow for passage of high vessels, and many of them are drawbridges. The very low hydraulic gradient of the river, along with the dredging, gives the river an estuarine-like character. Much of the shoreline is hardened by riprap, bulkhead Towns of Arcade, Java, and Sheldon, before flowing into Erie County. The creek flows through Elma and West Seneca, before its confluence with Cayuga Creek in West Seneca.

Cayuga Creek is the northernmost tributary in the watershed. This 40-mile-long (64 km) creek begins in primarily farmland/wooded areas and passes through several residential communities, including Cheektowaga, Lancaster, and Depew, before its confluence with Buffalo Creek.

The East Branch of Cazenovia Creek begins in Sardinia, and the West Branch begins in Concord. The land adjacent to these two branches is primarily agricultural and wooded areas, with the exception of several small residential communities. The two branches meet near East Aurora, after which Cazenovia Creek flows through the towns of Aurora, Elma, and West Seneca, and the city of Buffalo until its confluence with the Buffalo River.

== History ==
The Buffalo Creek area is believed to have been held by the Neutral Nation prior to the 1650s, when the Seneca nation and its Iroquois allies conquered the territory during the Beaver Wars. In the spring of 1780, the British established a village on Buffalo Creek for the mostly Seneca people who had been forced off their lands after fighting for the British during the Sullivan Expedition of 1779. They had fled to Fort Niagara for refuge with the British. After the war, the Buffalo Creek area was developed further as a Seneca settlement.

On July 8, 1788, Oliver Phelps and Nathaniel Gorham met with representatives of the Five Nations of the Iroquois Confederacy (including Mohawk, Oneida, Onondaga, Cayuga, and Seneca) at Buffalo Creek to execute a deed or treaty for rights to their lands in New York State east of the Genesee River (see Phelps and Gorham Purchase). In 1838, the Treaty of Buffalo Creek dealt with the disposition of the remaining land in New York held by the nations of the Iroquois Confederation. The federal government released a total of about 5 million acres for sale.

In 1825, the Buffalo River was the western terminus for the Erie Canal, constructed through the Mohawk River valley in New York state. Entry to the river from the Canal was gained via the mouth of a small tributary, Little Buffalo Creek, which was excavated and stabilized to form the Commercial Slip leading from the Erie Canal. The Buffalo River formed the southwest boundary of the rough pentagon that enclosed the "Five Points" or "Canal Street" district, bounded on the northeast by the Erie Canal. When the Canal was completed in 1825, New York Governor Dewitt Clinton's vessel was towed from the Canal through the Commercial Slip and Buffalo River to Lake Erie. There in a celebration ceremony, he poured Atlantic Ocean water into the Lake, and collected lake water to place in the ocean after his return trip to New York City.

On January 24, 1968, the Buffalo River burst into flames due to its heavy pollution. The river fire helped Stanley Spisiak, a local jeweler and conservationist, to fight for the river cleanup effort.

=== Origin of the name ===
It is believed that the city of Buffalo was named after Buffalo Creek. There are several unsourced theories for the origin of the creek's name. Early French and Moravian explorers reported the abundance of buffalo (or American bison) on the south shore of Lake Erie, but their presence on the banks of Buffalo Creek is still a matter of debate. The origin of the name of the creek is still uncertain. Neither the Seneca name (Te-osah-wa, "Place of the Basswoods") or the French name ("River of Horses") survived, so the current name likely dates to the British occupation, which began with the capture of Fort Niagara in 1759. The British engineer John Montresor mentions the name Buffalo Creek four times in his journal of 1764, indicating that the name was in common use at that time. Numerous other Buffalo Creeks are feature names in the United States, many in eastern states. Scholars believe it is likely most were named after the animal, as was done with numerous Beaver Creeks, Otter Creeks, etc.

== Contamination and remediation ==
The Buffalo River and to a lesser degree its tributaries have been the site of heavy industry, although this has declined in recent decades. This, along with large combined sewer overflows along the river, has resulted in highly contaminated sediments and impaired water quality. In 1987, most of the Buffalo River along with the City Ship Canal was listed as one of 43 Great Lakes Areas of Concern in The Great Lakes Water Quality Agreement between the United States and Canada. For over 60 years Stanley Spisiak, known as Mr. Buffalo River, fought for the cleanup of the Buffalo River. In 2011, the Buffalo River Restoration Project commenced, which includes major dredging to remove contaminated sediment, habitat restoration, and site access projects. According to a statement by the Army Corps of Engineers in the spring of 2012, the project will result in the Buffalo River being removed from the list of Areas of Concern in three to five years.

== Recreation ==
The Buffalo office of the New York State Department of Environmental Conservation established the Buffalo River Urban Canoe Trail and published a guide in the 1990s describing the bridges, factories and other points of interest along the river. In 2011, Buffalo River Fest Park was opened along the river, including docks, a boardwalk, and a band stand.

== See also ==
- List of New York rivers
