= Buffalo Creek (Mountain Fork) =

Stream in the US state of Missouri

Location
- Country: United States
- States: Arkansas, Oklahoma

Basin features
- Tributaries
  - left: Hickory Creek

Buffalo Creek is a stream in southwest Arkansas and southeast Oklahoma in the United States. It is a tributary of Mountain Fork of the Little River. The stream headwaters arise in Polk County, Arkansas at 34°25′43.32″N 94°18′11.88″W approximately four miles northeast of Vandervoort in the southwest corner of the Caney Creek Wilderness. The stream flows west crossing under US Route 71 one mile south of Cove. The stream turns to the south then west to enter Oklahoma approximately three miles southeast of the community of Plunketville. The stream continues to the west and turns southwesterly as it passes the community of Buffalo. It continues to the southwest and enters Mountain Fork Little River at the upper (northern) end of Broken Bow Lake. The confluence is at 34°21′59.38″N 94°41′24.79″W.
