= Buffalo Creek (South Carolina) =

Stream in Cherokee County, South Carolina, U.S.

Coordinates: 34°41′08″N 81°41′06″W

Buffalo Creek is a stream in Union County, South Carolina, in the United States.

Buffalo Creek was named from the fact pioneer settlers saw buffalo there.

== See also ==
- List of rivers of South Carolina
