= Big Buffalo Creek =

Stream in Jackson County, South Dakota, U.S.

Big Buffalo Creek is a stream in Jackson County in the U.S. state of South Dakota.

The stream headwaters are at 43°45′53″N 101°58′41″W and its confluence with Whitewater Creek is at 43°54′20″N 101°51′00″W.

Big Buffalo Creek was named for the buffalo which grazed there.

== See also ==
- List of rivers of South Dakota
