= Buffalo Creek (Lake and Minnehaha counties, South Dakota) =

Stream in the U.S. state of South Dakota

Coordinates: 43°52′41″N 96°53′49″W

Buffalo Creek is a stream in the U.S. state of South Dakota.

Buffalo Creek was named for its source, Buffalo Lake, which in turn was named after the large number of buffalo bones found near it.

== See also ==
- List of rivers of South Dakota
