= Horse Hollow (Shannon County, Missouri) =

Valley in the American state of Missouri

Coordinates: 37.1619931°N 91.4243037°W

Horse Hollow is a valley in Shannon County in the U.S. state of Missouri.

Horse Hollow was named for the fact horses were corralled in the valley to prevent theft.
