= Clear Creek (Iowa River tributary) =

Stream in Johnson and Iowa County, Iowa, U.S.

Coordinates: 41.670016°N 91.562947°W

Clear Creek is a stream in Johnson and Iowa counties, Iowa, in the United States. It is a tributary of Iowa River.

The name of Clear Creek originally referred to the clarity of its waters, which have since become muddied with the advent of intensive agriculture in the area.

== See also ==
- List of rivers of Iowa
