= Buffalo Creek (Mississippi River tributary) =

Stream in the US state of Missouri

Coordinates: 39.431713°N 91.0193022°W

Buffalo Creek is a stream in Pike County in the U.S. state of Missouri. It is a tributary of the Mississippi River.

Buffalo Creek was so named on account of buffalo in the area.

== See also ==
- List of rivers of Missouri
