= Whitewater Creek (South Dakota) =

Stream in South Dakota, U.S.

Coordinates: 43°54′20″N 101°51′00″W

Whitewater Creek is a stream in the U.S. state of South Dakota.

The name stems from the water's white-gray color, a function of sediment carried by the river from its source near the Badlands.

== See also ==
- List of rivers of South Dakota
