= Buffalo Creek (Current River tributary) =

Stream in the U.S. state of Missouri

Coordinates: 36°43′13″N 90°55′14″W

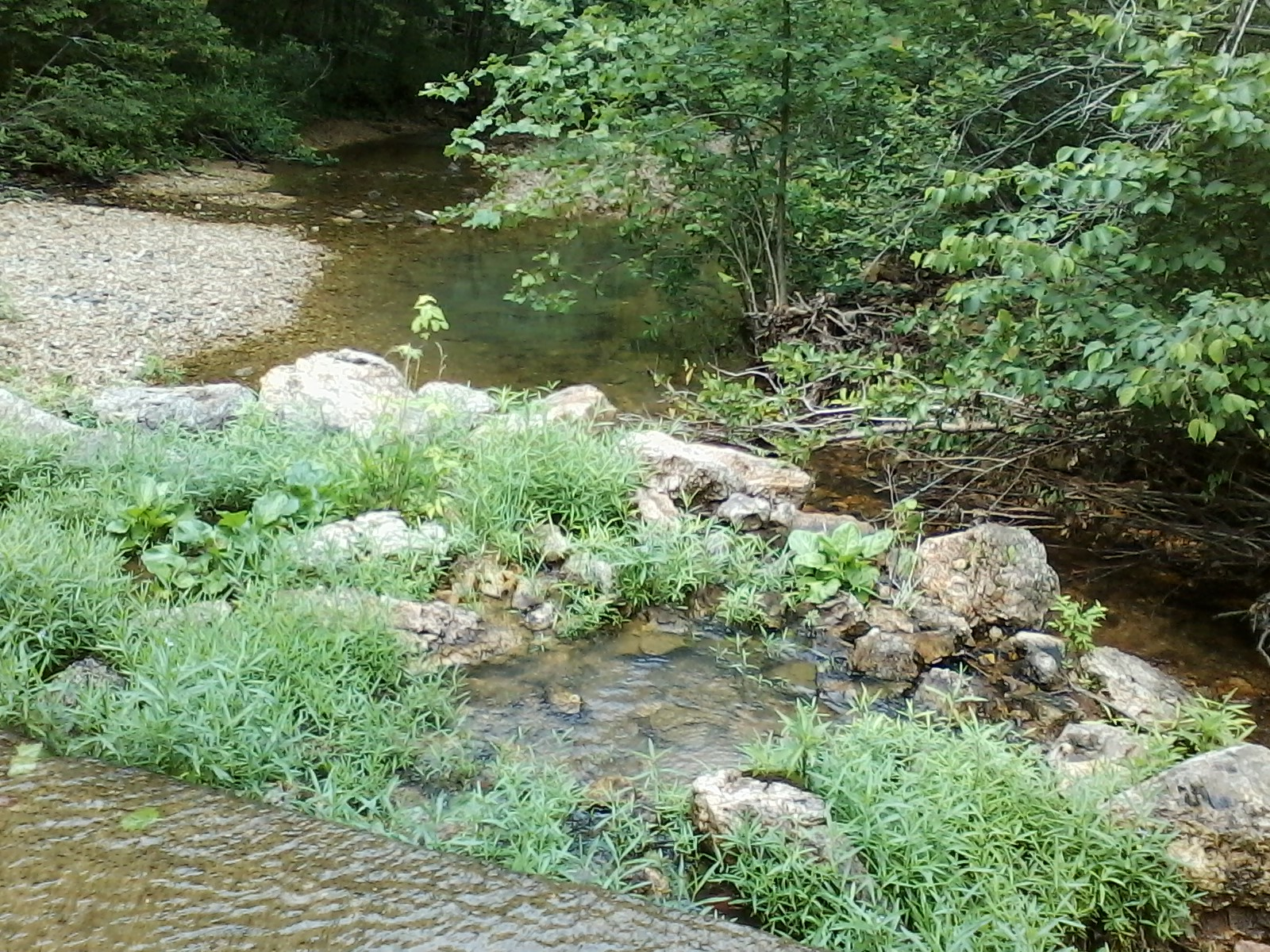
Buffalo Creek

Buffalo Creek is a stream in northeastern Ripley County in southeastern Missouri. It is a tributary of the Current River.

The stream begins at the confluence of the North and South Fork of the Buffalo at and its confluence with the Current is at adjacent to Buffalo Club.

The stream was named for either buffalo in the area or the buffalo fish in the creek.

== See also ==
- List of rivers of Missouri
