= North Park, Buffalo =

Neighborhood in Buffalo, New York

Coordinates: 42.9477166°N 78.85586°W

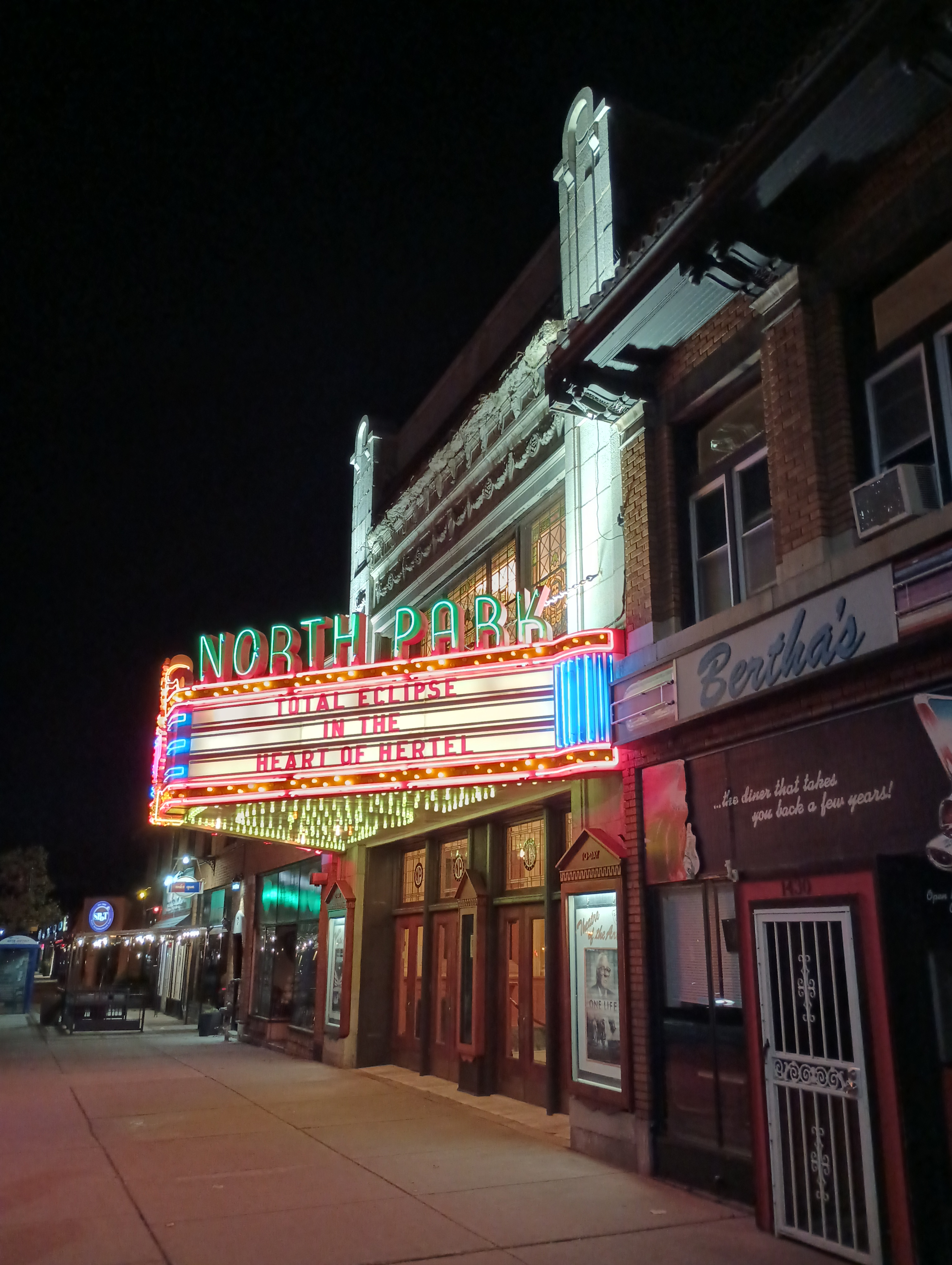
North Park Theatre in 2024

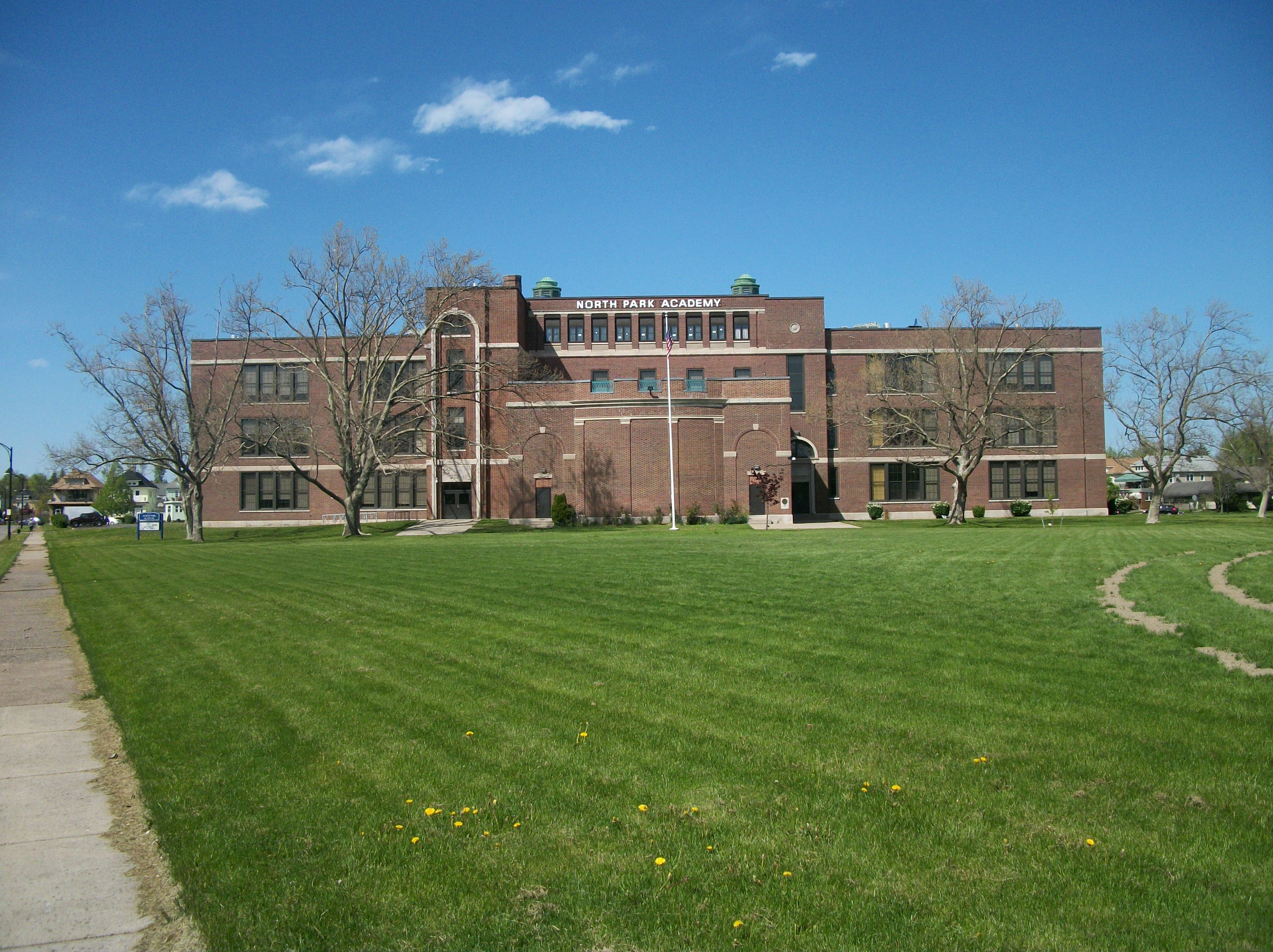
North Park Academy

North Park is a neighborhood within the City of Buffalo in New York State. It is one of several neighborhoods that constitute the larger community of North Buffalo. The neighborhood's borders are roughly Delaware Avenue to the west, The former DL&W railroad to the north and east, and the Beltline Railroad and the Central Park neighborhood to the South.

== Notable businesses and institutions ==
These businesses and institutions utilizing the North Park name:

1. North Park Community School (Public School 50) - Formerly known as North Park Academy (Public School 66)
2. North Park Theatre
3. North Park Branch of the Buffalo & Erie County Public Library system.
4. North Park Lutheran Church
5. North Park Branch - Bank of America
6. North Park Florists
7. North Park Community Preschool
8. Hertel North Park Youth Baseball
9. North Park Station (former Beltline railroad station)

== See also ==
- Neighborhoods of Buffalo, New York
