= North Buffalo, Buffalo =

Coordinates: 42.9367°N 78.8718°W

North Buffalo
- Neighborhood
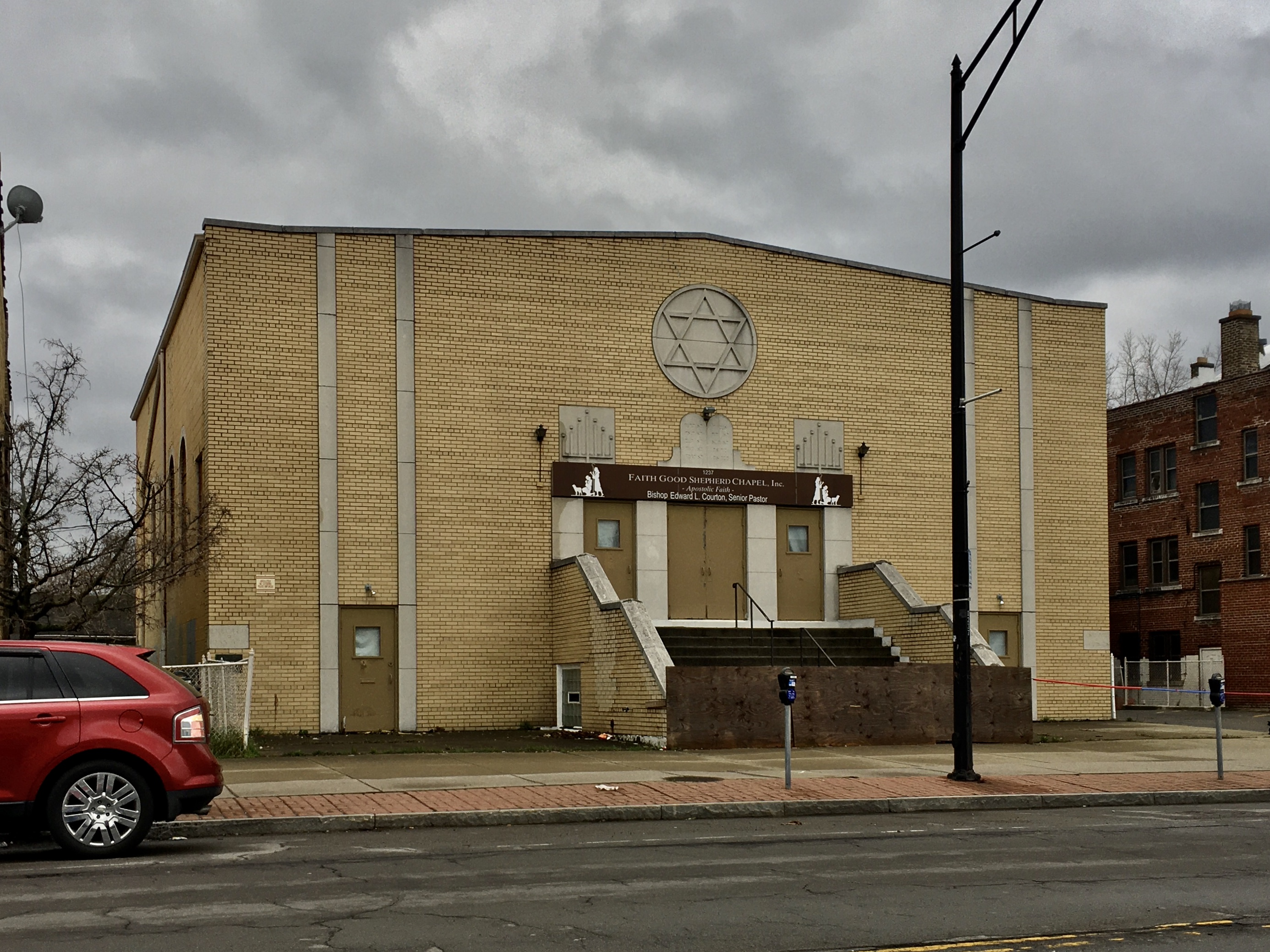
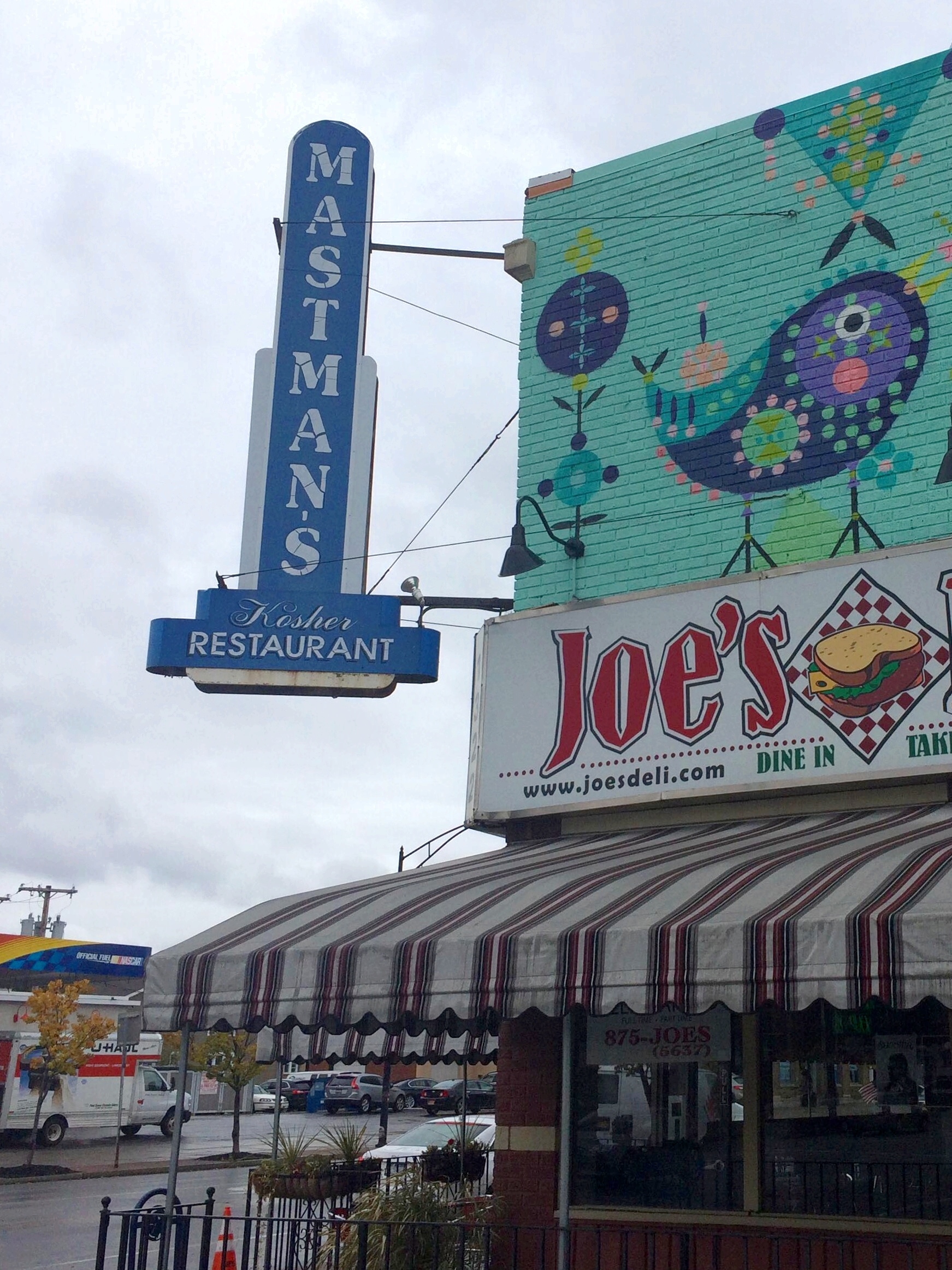
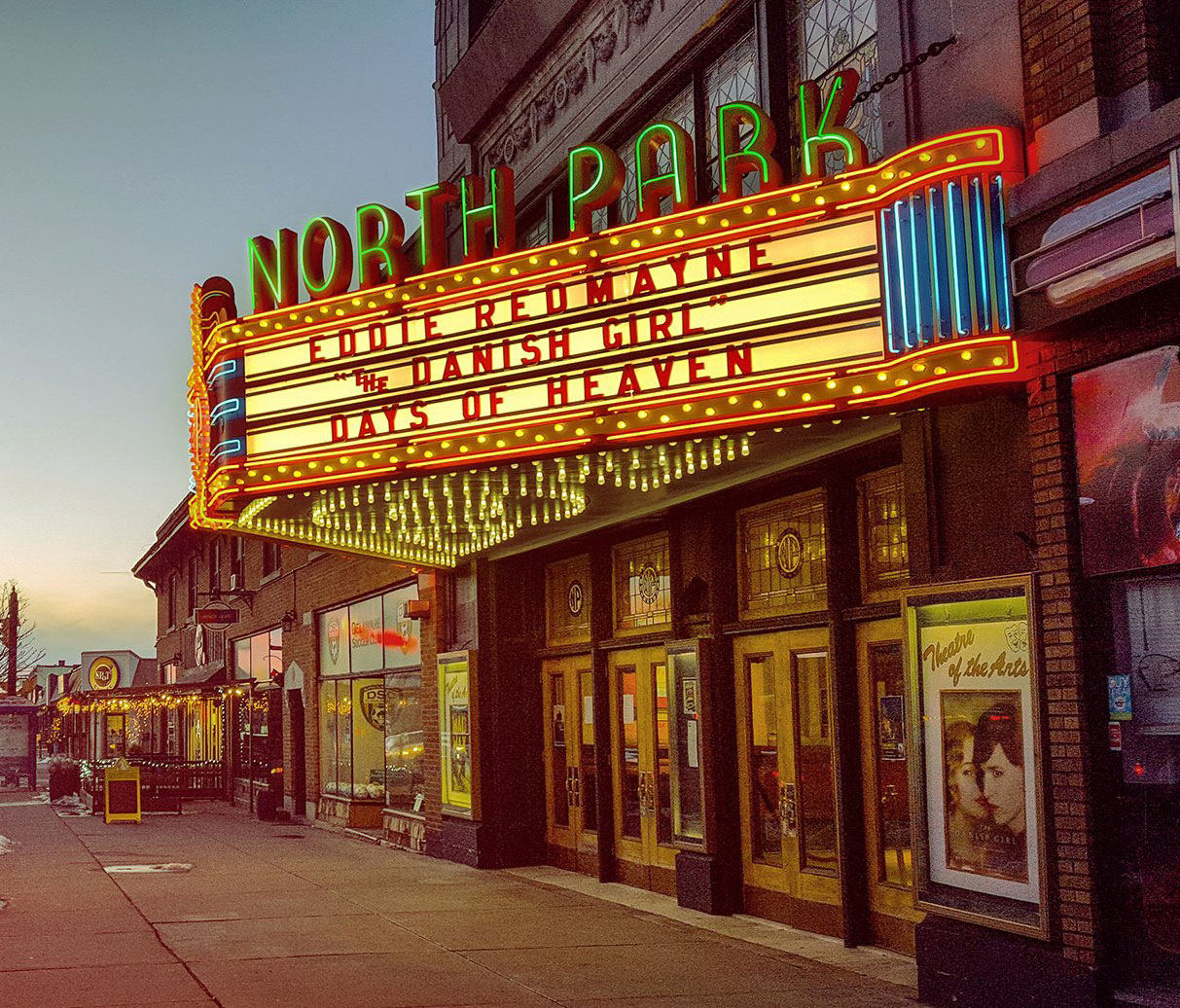
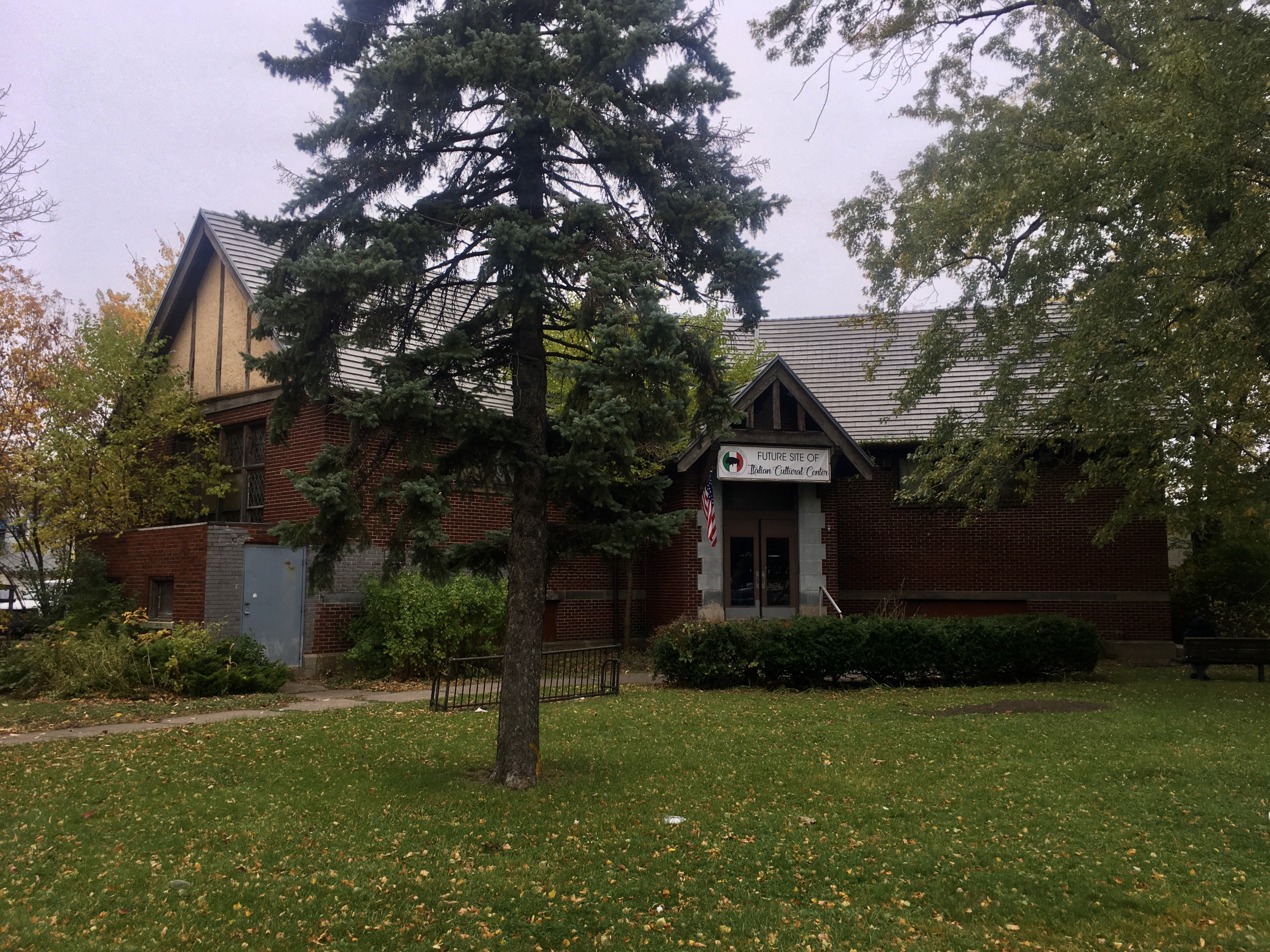
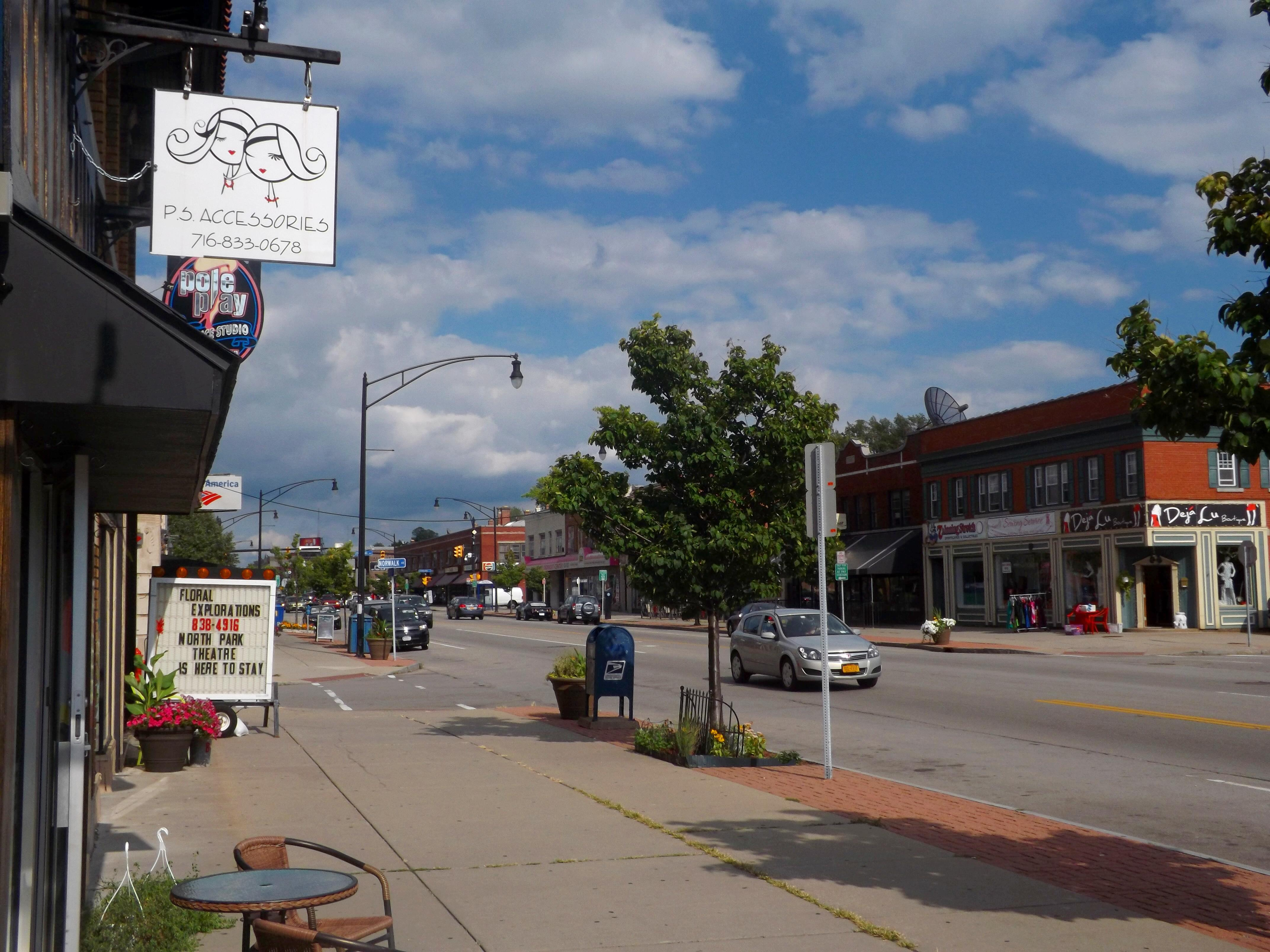
- Left to right from top: former B'rith Israel Anshe Ames Synagogue, Joe's Deli, North Park Theatre, Italian Cultural Center, Hertel Avenue business district
- Nickname: Little Italy
- Interactive map of North Buffalo
- Country: United States
- State: New York
- City: Buffalo, New York

Government
  - Council Member: Joel Feroleto (D)

North Buffalo, is a collection of neighborhoods in the city of Buffalo, New York.

== Geography ==
North Buffalo is one of Buffalo's 5 main areas (North Buffalo, South Buffalo, East Side, West Side, Central Business District) and contains several of Buffalo's 35 neighborhoods including

- Central Park
- North Park
- Parkside
- Park Meadow
- University Heights

North Buffalo stretches from the city's border with Kenmore, New York to several neighborhoods to the south with Delaware Park forming the southern border. At its western boundary is Elmwood Avenue. The eastern border is Main Street. The topography of North Buffalo is flat. Cornelius Creek once flowed through North Buffalo, along a path roughly following Hertel Avenue. Cornelius Creek is now one of the many buried creeks in Buffalo, and is incorporated into the city's storm sewer system.

The area is serviced by the NFTA's Metro Rail LaSalle Station and Amherst Street Station as well as by the NFTA's buses on Delaware Avenue (No. 25), Colvin Avenue (No. 11), Hertel Avenue (No. 23), Elmwood Avenue (No. 20), Main Street (No. 8), Kenmore Avenue (No.5), and Amherst Street (No. 32).

== Culture ==
North Buffalo is heavily populated with Italian-Americans, as evidenced by the Hertel Avenue strip which has many Italian restaurants, bakeries, and stores. This area along Hertel Avenue is now locally known as Little Italy. Many Italians in North Buffalo migrated from the West Side in the 1970s and 1980s, when Puerto Ricans first began to settle in traditionally Italian-American neighborhoods west of Richmond Avenue. The Italian Village Festival, now called the Italian Heritage Festival, moved from Connecticut Street on the West Side to Hertel Avenue in North Buffalo in 1988.

From the 1950s until the late 1970s, North Buffalo was the historic center of Buffalo's Jewish community. Jews first settled in North Buffalo in the 1920s, with Jewish developers building a sizable number of single-family houses and two-flats in the North Park/Hertel Avenue area. The growth of the neighborhood's Jewish population rapidly accelerated in the 1950s, when urban renewal in the Lower East Side, and racial transition exacerbated by blockbusting in the Hamlin Park neighborhood, displaced the formerly large Jewish population of those communities. Although the majority of Jews in the Buffalo area now live in suburban Amherst and Williamsville, many remain in North Buffalo; particularly secular and Orthodox Jews. The neighborhood is home to several Orthodox synagogues and schools, and institutions such as the Schvitz.

Because of its pedestrian-oriented environment; proximity to downtown Buffalo, the University at Buffalo, and suburban office parks; and high-quality 1920s-era housing stock, North Buffalo is experiencing an influx of young professional homebuyers.

== Notable events ==
For many years, North Buffalo held the annual Italian Heritage and Food Festival along Hertel Avenue. Traditionally held in July, it was held August 1–4 in 2013. It is considered to be among the five largest street festivals in the United States.

== Notable places ==
- Delaware Park forms part of its southern border.
- North Park Theater
- Buffalo Zoo

== See also ==
- Neighborhoods of Buffalo, New York
