= University Heights, Buffalo =

Neighborhood in New York

Coordinates: 42°57′19.4112″N 78°49′39.48″W

The University Heights District is a neighborhood in Buffalo, New York.

== Geography ==
The University Heights neighborhood is in the northern corner of Buffalo. Main Street (NY 5) bisects University Heights. Main Street in University Heights has an assortment of restaurants, bars, retail stores, and places of worship, many catering to the students of the University at Buffalo.

The University Heights neighborhood is bounded on the west and south by the former Erie-Lackawanna Railroad right-of-way, across which is the North Buffalo, Buffalo, New York neighborhood. Kenmore Avenue, which forms the boundary between the City of Buffalo and the towns of Amherst and Tonawanda, forms the northern edge of the neighborhood. The Kenilworth neighborhood in Tonawanda and the Eggertsville neighborhood in Amherst lie across Kenmore Avenue. The Eastern Boundary is Main Street and the University at Buffalo.

== Gallery ==
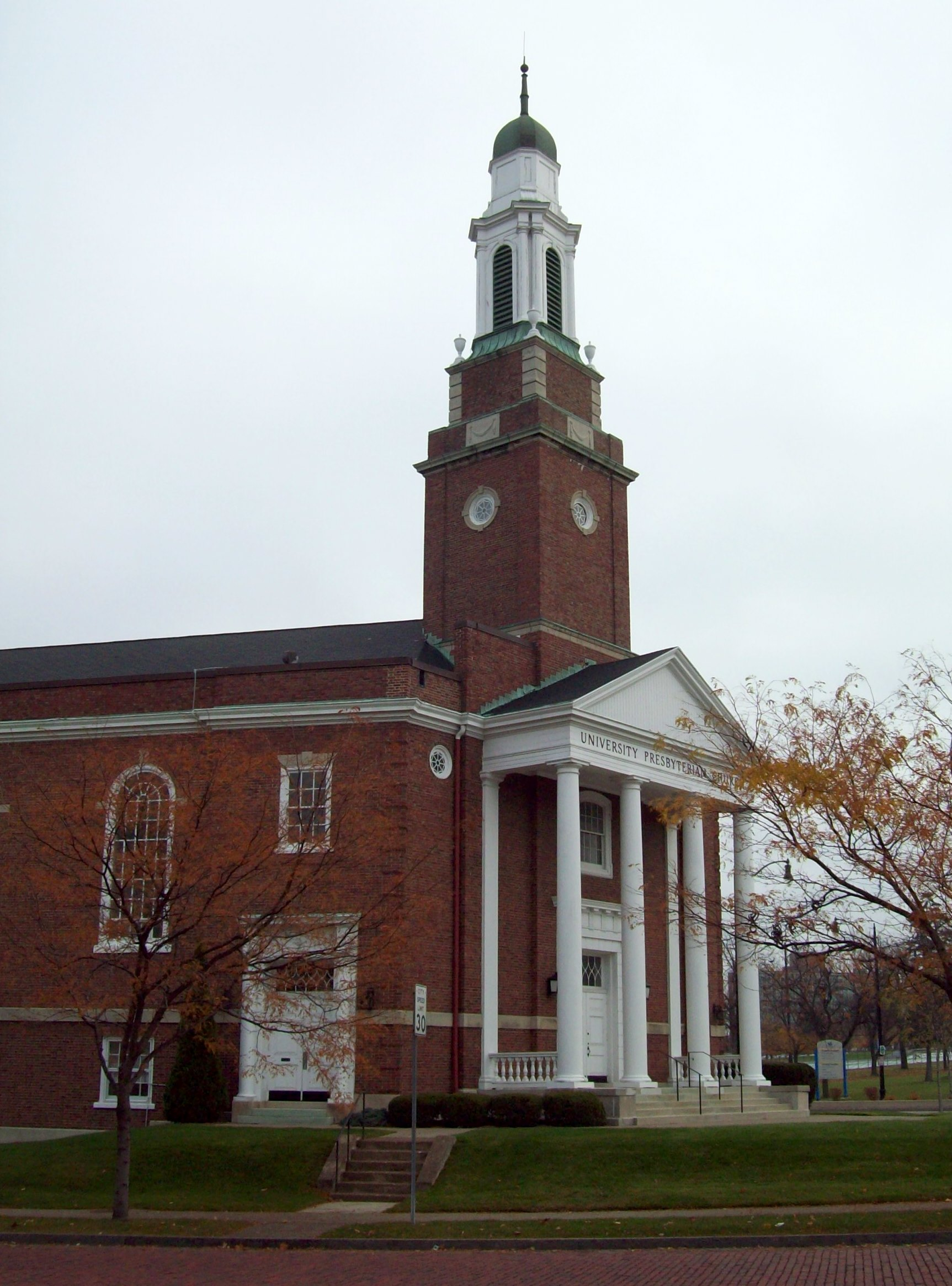
University Presbyterian Church, University Heights.

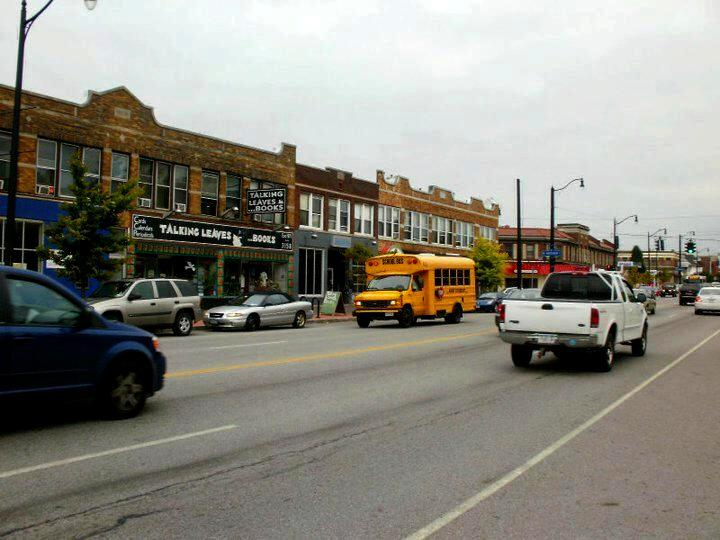
A view of Main Street in the University Heights business district.

== See also ==
- Neighborhoods of Buffalo, New York
