= Ghost light =

Ghost light or ghostlight may refer to:

- Ghost light (theatre), a light left lit overnight in a theater
- Atmospheric ghost lights, lights (or fires) that appear in the atmosphere without an obvious cause

== Books ==
- Ghost Light, or Will O' the Wisp, a 1931 novel by the French writer Pierre Drieu La Rochelle
- Ghost Light, a 1993 novel by Rick Hautala
- Ghost Light, a 2010 novel by Joseph O'Connor
- Ghost Light, a 2016 novel by Stan Jones
- Ghost Lights (novel), a 2011 novel by Lydia Millet
- Ghostlight, a 1995 novel by Marion Zimmer Bradley
- Silver Surfer: Ghost Light, a 2023 comic book series in the Silver Surfer series
- The Ghost Light, a 1984 short story collection by Fritz Lieber

== Film and television ==
- Ghost Light (Doctor Who), a 1989 serial from the British TV series
- Ghost Light (2018 film), an American horror film
- Ghostlight (2024 film), an American drama film

== Music ==
- Ghost Light (band), a jam band from Philadelphia, Pennsylvania
- Ghostlight (album), a 2022 album by Finnish rock band Poets of the Fall
- Ghostlights, a 2016 album by German metal supergroup Avantasia
- "Ghost Light", a 2022 single by TheFatRat and Everglow

== Other uses ==
- Ghostlight Theatre, a theater company in North Tonawanda, New York
- Ghost Light (play)
