= Ghostlight Theatre =

Coordinates: 43.031265°N 78.874194°W

- Frieden Church of North Tonawanda
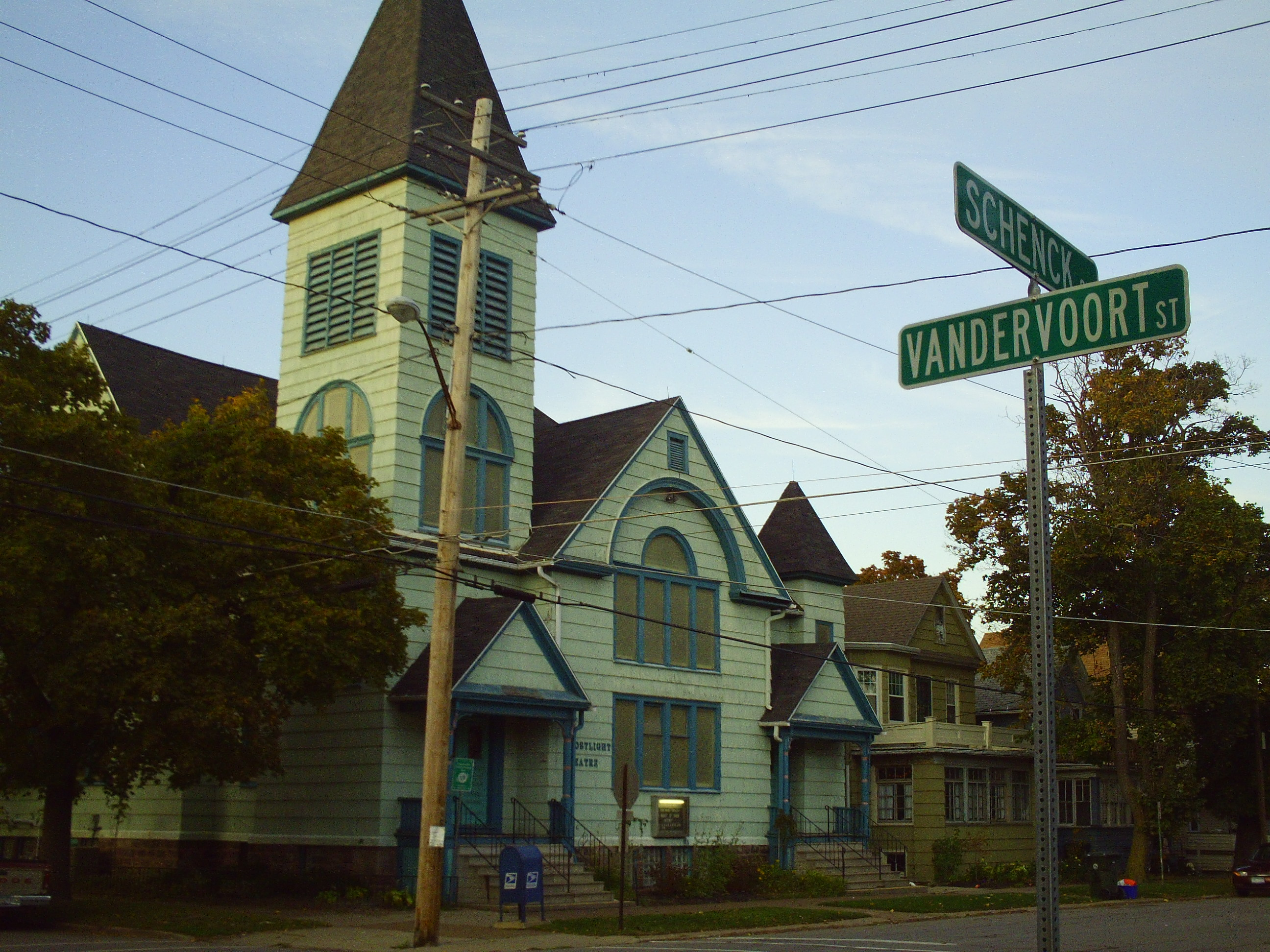
- Ghostlight Theatre
- Interactive map of Ghostlight Theatre
- Address: 170 Schenck St. North Tonawanda, New York; United States
- Owner: L. Don Swartz
- Capacity: 214
- Current use: Live Theatre

Construction
- Opened: 2001
- Years active: 2001–present
- Architects: George Fischer of the Gombert & Thompson Company

Website
- www.starrynighttheatre.com

Ghostlight Theatre (also known as Starry Night Theatre) is a theater company located in North Tonawanda, New York. The building was originally a UCC Church, known as Deutsche Vereinigte Evangelische Friedens Gemeinde (German United Evangelical Peace Congregation) of North Tonawanda.

== History ==
Construction started in 1889 to serve as a church for the German Immigrants who were separated from the rest of the immigrant population. This was caused by the construction of the Erie Canal, which in effect segregated the residents of Tonwanda and North Tonawanda.

The request to separate was rejected by the Synod at the time, and congregational members decided to splinter off and form a church that had no affiliation, thereby becoming a Frieden Church, or Free Church.

It served that role until June 2000, when it moved to its new location in Amherst, New York. In January 2001, the building was then purchased by Starry Night Theatre, Inc., and the name was changed to The Ghostlight Theatre.

== Current events ==
The building currently seats 214 people, and runs its shows throughout the year. Each season includes a fall thriller, a holiday classic, a winter drama, a spring comedy and a summer musical. Past shows include A Christmas Carol, by Charles Dickens, and Little Women.

The Starry Night Theatre group is run by L. Don Swartz, who writes many of the plays that are performed at the Ghostlight Theatre, such as All Through the Night, The Birds That Stay, and A Night of Dark Intent.

The building has also had some reports of paranormal activity, with at least four paranormal investigation groups, such as Western New York Paranormal, Erie County Paranormal Association, Soul Seekers United and Buffalo Paranormal Society.

Many of these groups have purportedly experienced ghost sightings and recorded instances of electronic voice phenomena.

== See also ==
- Riviera Theatre (North Tonawanda, New York)
- Shea's Performing Arts Center
- North Park Theatre
