= North Buffalo =

North Buffalo may refer to:

- North Buffalo Township, Pennsylvania, a township in Pennsylvania
- North Buffalo, Buffalo, a neighbourhood in Buffalo, New York
