= Buffalo Criterion =

American Newspaper

Buffalo Criterion is a historic African-American newspaper published in Buffalo, New York from 1925 until 1973 and from 1978 until the present. Frank E. Merriweather and his wife Camilla Merriweather were its founders and he was its publisher. It is still published by the Merriweather family and is the oldest African-American newspaper in Western New York.

The Frank E. Merriweather, Jr. Branch of the Buffalo & Erie County Public Library is named after one of the Merriweathers. The paper's offices are located at 623 William Street in Buffalo. Frank Gist is a columnist and hosts a radio program.

The Buffalo Urban League was founded the same year as the paper. It is a weekly newspaper. It is one of several African American newspapers that has served Buffalo.

== History ==
The paper was based out of the Savoy Theater on William Street designed by Henry Spann.
