= Henry Spann =

American theater architect

Henry L. Spann (February 13, 1879 – October 3, 1946) was a church and theater architect in Buffalo, New York. He is credited with designing about a dozen of the city's theaters as well as ones in surrounding areas including Niagara, New York. He built theaters for various owners. He worked with his much younger brother William T. Spann who was also an architect. Spann also designed buildings for Catholic institutions in the area.

Spann's theater designs for Michael Shea incorporated commercial space.

The North Park Theatre he designed remains in existence and efforts were underway to preserve the Sattler Theater on Broadway. Shea's Seneca commercial building section remains and was being proposed for National Register of Historic Places consideration in 2018.

== Work ==
- Sattler Theater (1914) for retail tycoon John G. Sattler 512 - 516 Broadway in Buffalo It became the Broadway Theater had a pipe organ installed and eventually served as a mosque and church. It is terra cotta clad.
- Savoy Theater on William Street in Buffalo, former home to the Buffalo Criterion newspaper
- North Park Theatre on Hertel Avenue in Buffalo (open)
- Abott Theatre in Buffalo (closed)
- Bailey Theatre in Buffalo (closed)
- Broadway Theatre in Buffalo (closed)
- Genesee Theatre in Buffalo (closed)
- Maxine Theater in Buffalo (closed)
- Olympic Theater in Buffalo (closed)
- Roxy Theatre in Buffalo (closed)
- Shea's Kensington Theater in Buffalo (closed)
- Shea's Niagara Theater in Buffalo (closed)
- Shea's Roosevelt Theater in Buffalo (closed)
- Shea's Seneca on Seneca and Cazenovia streets in downtown South Buffalo Has been adapted to various uses over the years.
- Strand Theatre in Niagara Falls, New York (closed)
- Theater in Batavia, New York
- South Park Theater (1919) in Buffalo
- Majestic Theater (1910) at William and Sherman St
- Mother of Mercy Hospital 1922 brick, stone, and steel and a power house for the Mother House of the Sisters of Charity
- St. Mary's Roman Catholic Church school in Dunkirk, New York
- House in Parkside
- 309 Beard Ave built in 1914 for Charles Manzel(l) Source : American Contractor Vol 35, 1914
- 168 Woodbridge Ave built in 1915 for Joseph Zenger Source: American Contractor 1915
- 272 Woodbridge Ave built in 1920 , advertised as a fireproof house as it is made of cement blocks Source: The National Builder vol 63 1920
