= Shea's Performing Arts Center =

Theater in Buffalo, New York

Coordinates: 42°53′29″N 78°52′25″W

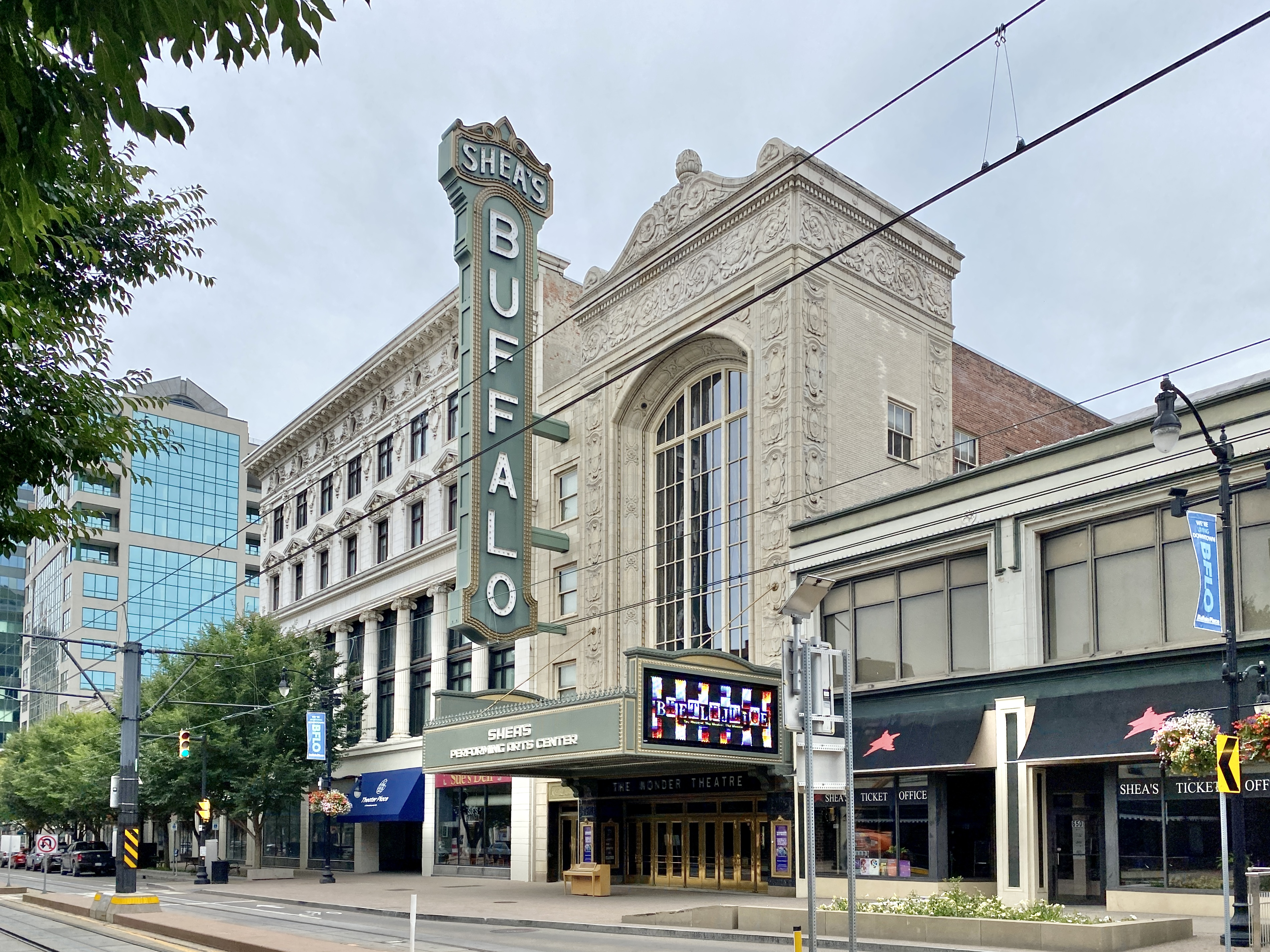
- Interactive map of Shea's Performing Arts Center
- Former names: Shea's Buffalo (1926–48; 1976–93); Loew's Buffalo Theater (1948–75)
- Address: 646 Main St; Buffalo, NY 14202-1906
- Owner: City of Buffalo
- Operator: Shea's O'Connell Preservation Guild Ltd.
- Capacity: 3,019

Construction
- Groundbreaking: January 15, 1925
- Opened: January 16, 1926
- Closed: June 30, 1975
- Reopened: February 25, 1976
- Cost: $1.8 million ($33.4 million in 2025 dollars)
- Architect: Rapp Brothers
- Structural engineer: McClintic-Marshall
- General contractors: John Gill & Sons
- Main contractor: Bass Construction

Website
- Venue website
- Shea's Buffalo Theatre
- U.S. National Register of Historic Places
- New York State Register of Historic Places
- NRHP reference No.: 75001186
- NYSRHP No.: 02940.002871

Significant dates
- Added to NRHP: May 6, 1975
- Designated NYSRHP: June 23, 1980

Shea's Performing Arts Center is a theater for touring Broadway musicals and special events in Buffalo, New York. Originally called Shea's Buffalo, it was opened in 1926 to show silent movies. It took one year to build the entire theatre. Shea's boasts one of the few theater organs in the US that is still in operation in the theater for which it was designed.

== History ==
=== Design and early years ===
Shea's Buffalo, the flagship of the theater chain, was designed by the architecture firm Rapp and Rapp of Chicago. Modeled in a combination of Spanish and French Baroque and Rococo styles, the theatre was designed to resemble opera houses and palaces of Europe of the 17th and 18th centuries. Originally, the seating accommodated nearly 4,000 people, but several hundred seats were removed in the 1930s to make more comfortable accommodations in the orchestra area; there are now 3,019 seats at Shea's.

The interior was designed by designer and artist Louis Comfort Tiffany, with most of the elements still in place today. Many of the furnishings and fixtures were supplied by Marshall Field's in Chicago and included immense, high-quality Czechoslovak crystal chandeliers. The interior contained over 1-acre (4,000 m^{2}) of seating.

The cost of construction and outfitting of the theater in 1926 was just over $1.9 million. This was at a time when a new house could be purchased for $3,000 and a new Model A Ford was $1,000. The theater opened on January 16, 1926, with the film The King on Main Street, starring Adolphe Menjou.

When Michael Shea retired in 1930, Vincent R. McFaul, who had worked with Mr. Shea from 1900, was the general manager of the Shea's chain. He owned and managed several dozen Shea's Theaters, per Mike Shea's and Vincent's plan, until his death in 1955. Loew's Theatres took over the chain's interests in 1948.

=== Disrepair and later years ===
The theatre had a not-so-unusual history of falling into some disrepair in the 1960s and 1970s when downtown Buffalo was in decline. It was operated at that time by Loew's Corporation, primarily as a showcase for "Blacksploitation" films such as the Super Fly series. The theatre was owned at that time by Leon Lawrence Sidell, who was failing to pay his taxes.

A small group of folks, led by Curt Mangel, and including Steve LaManna, Ben Hiltz, Dan Harter and 9 others known as the original "Friends of the Buffalo" theatre, began doing work on the organ, and Mr. Mangel became the engineer of the building. Mangel, and at times others as well, lived in the building in the upper floors of the dressing rooms for almost a year, while working on various needs of the theatre.

When it became apparent that the theatre would default to the city on back taxes owed by Leon Lawrence Sidell, Loew's was preparing to leave and strip the theatre of its contents. The Friends went through the theatre and inventoried every item. In a landmark court decision, a judge blocked Loew's from removing the contents, including chandeliers, furniture, the organ, and projection equipment. The claim was that Loew's owned these items, while a legal counter-argument stated that the items were an integral part of the theatre. The judge actually toured the theatre, including the organ chambers, and ruled for the Friends and the City.

The building, which could be considered a very high-profile political football, came under the supervision of then-Comptroller George O'Connell, for whom the theatre was later surnamed. Under his watch, and the Friends, the theatre was able to keep its utilities running, and repairs began. The Friends of the Buffalo were then given operating privileges of the building and undertook massive restoration through government grants, and developed a performance series in the late 1970s.

Broadway Theatre manager and producer (Mummenschanz) Robert B. D'Angelo were brought in as CEO in the late 1970s. In his short span at the helm, he booked multi-week engagements of several major Broadway national tours, including A Chorus Line, Chicago, Annie and Les Misérables, helping to reestablish Buffalo as an important stop on the Broadway tour circuit.

A grand re-opening was mounted to a sold-out audience in the late 1970s with Cab Calloway and George Burns. Calloway had performed at the theatre at its original opening week in 1926, and Burns had performed there in the late 1940s.

The volunteer Friends of the Buffalo group was replaced by a professional management team. The Friends continued to enlarge its volunteer base, which worked on various restoration projects, including the Wurlitzer Organ.

The theatre has been a hugely successful performance center, having undergone a large expansion of its stage facilities to accommodate larger touring productions. Additionally, it is used as a host site for area events, such as the 43North entrepreneurship competition.

Performers at Shea's from New York and southern Ontario have included:

The Ink Spots in 1939; Frank Sinatra for six nights in 1941; Ella Fitzgerald in 1945; Foreigner in 1977; Toronto in 1980; Blue Öyster Cult in 1984; INXS in 1985; 10,000 Maniacs in 1988; Eddie Money in 1988; Liza Minnelli in 1992; Peter, Paul and Mary in 1993; Toronto's Barenaked Ladies in 1994; Buffalo's Goo Goo Dolls in 1995, 1999, and 2018; Toronto's Our Lady Peace in 1998; Ontario's Gordon Lightfoot in 2008; composer Andrew Lloyd Webber in 2009; Rob Base and DJ E-Z Rock with Kurtis Blow and Salt N Pepa in 2011; Public Enemy in 2012; Jerry Seinfeld in 2013; comedian Bill Maher in 2015; Mary J. Blige in 2015; and Steely Dan in 2017.

Performers at Shea's also include Impractical Jokers in 2018, Mariah Carey in 2019, Chris Rock in 2022, and Adam Sandler in 2023.

== Organ ==
The theater's "Mighty Wurlitzer" was a custom design organ built by the Wurlitzer Company and was one of only 5 in the world that had tonal finishing, provided directly from the Wurlitzer factory, after it had been installed in the theater. The organ was used as a demonstrator by the Wurlitzer Factory, in nearby North Tonawanda, whenever a visiting customer wanted to hear an example of a four manual (keyboard) organ installed in a theater. (The demonstrator for a three manual (keyboard) organ was the Riviera Theatre in North Tonawanda, New York.)

Built originally to provide silent film accompaniment, like many of the thousands of instruments like it, the organ fell into disrepair, rarely being heard in the 1940s and 1950s. It was made operational by the American Theatre Organ Enthusiasts (now the American Theatre Organ Society or ATOS) for a series of concerts. Around that time, a valuable set of brass trumpets, special pipework of a theatre organ, was stolen.

It then sat virtually silent until the late 1970s, when it was made playable again by the Friends of the Buffalo for the Grand Re-opening of the theatre. The Wurlitzer underwent a huge restoration, provided by monetary grants from various arts organizations, including complete replacement of the relay (switching) system that controlled the organ, as well as restoration of windchests, missing pipe replacements, wiring, and organ console work.

The revitalized organ was premiered to the public with a sold-out concert by noted theatre organist Lyn Larsen. Since that time it has been used for solo concerts, silent films, and background music prior to and after events in the theatre.

Within the last two years, the theatre has engaged another restoration of the instrument, as it will have been another 40 years since the last one.

In 2006, to commemorate the theater's 80th birthday, the Buffalo Philharmonic Orchestra under the direction of conductor JoAnn Falletta played a concert there, with Anthony Newman playing the organ. Highlights of the program included Camille Saint-Saëns "Organ" Symphony 3 in C minor, selections from The Phantom of the Opera, Bach's Toccata and Fugue in D minor, and Louis Vierne's Carillon de Westminster.

== See also ==
- Ghostlight Theatre
- North Park Theatre
- Riviera Theatre
- National Register of Historic Places listings in Buffalo, New York
