= Riviera Theatre (North Tonawanda, New York) =

Music venue and movie theater in New York, US

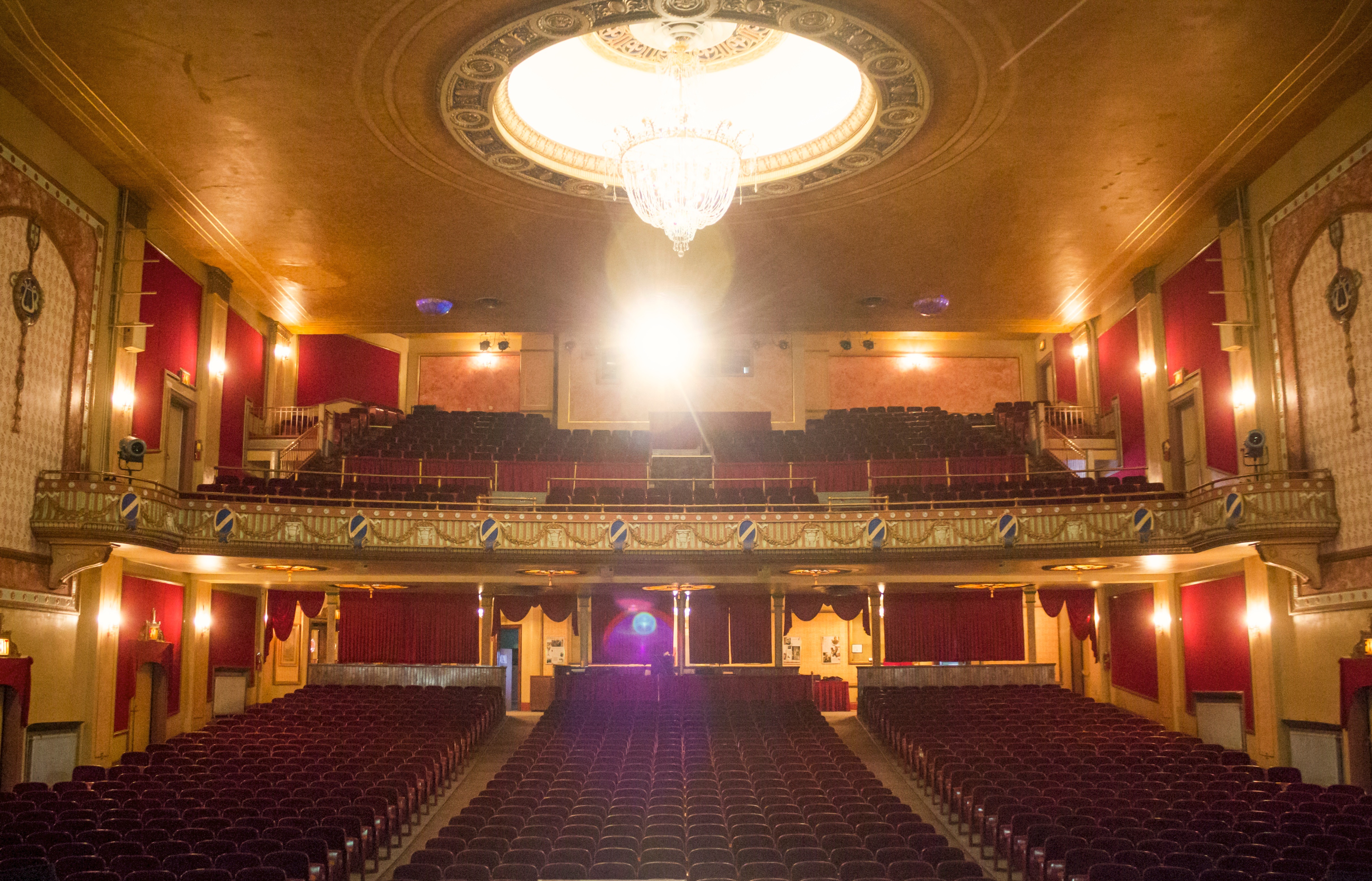
- Riviera Theatre Auditorium
- Interactive map of Riviera Theatre
- Address: 67 Webster St. North Tonawanda, New York; United States
- Owner: Rivera Theatre and Organ Preservation Society, Inc.
- Capacity: 1,140
- Type: Movie Palace
- Screen: 1
- Current use: Performing Arts Center
- Parking: Street/Lot

Construction
- Opened: December 30, 1926
- Years active: 90
- Architects: Leon H. Lempart and Son
- Builder: Yellen Family

Website
- www.rivieratheatre.org
- Riviera Theatre
- U.S. National Register of Historic Places
- Location within New York Location within the United States
- Coordinates: 43°1′26″N 78°52′38″W
- Area: 0.5 acres (0.20 ha)
- Built: 1926
- Architect: Lambert, Leon H.,& Sons
- NRHP reference No.: 80002731
- Added to NRHP: March 20, 1980

The Riviera Theatre is a 1,140-seat entertainment venue in North Tonawanda, New York. The theatre hosts live concerts, theatre, dance shows, and movies. The Riviera's “Mighty Wurlitzer” theatre organ has been restored, is maintained by volunteers, and is famed as being one of two original Wurlitzer demonstrator organs, which the company would use to show off to potential clients in the height of the silent film era.

The Riviera Theatre is listed on the New York State Register of Historic Places and the National Register of Historic Places.

== History ==
A local landmark and movie house, the theatre was constructed in 1926 to much fanfare, and was originally named "The New Rivera." The first films shown were Upstage starring Norma Shearer and The Mona Lisa. The Wurlitzer Theatre organ installed in the theatre: Opus 1524 was shipped from the nearby (4 mi) Wurlitzer Organ Factory on November 19, 1926. Listed as a Model 235 Special, the organ differed from a standard 3 manual 11 rank Model 235, by substituting an Oboe Horn rank of pipes from the standard Salicional pipes usually found on this model. Other differences included the omission of the standard remote Piano, and a 5 H.P. blower instead of the 7-1/2 H.P. The console was painted and decorated to harmonize with the theatre's interior, by Wurlitzer's Band Organ Artist. The theatre was also a popular vaudeville venue. During the Depression, the theatre was purchased by the Shea's Theater company. At the end of the silent movie era in the 1930s, the Wurlitzer Theatre organ went into disuse and disrepair and was not heard again until 1944, when it was refurbished. The Riviera was sold to Dipson Theatres and then to MDA Associates. The theatre changed hands many more times since then.

In the early 1970s, The Niagara Frontier Theater Organ Society (NFTOS) made an offer to purchase the Wurlitzer organ for a substantial amount, along with the provision the instrument must remain in the theatre. This offer was eventually accepted, the NFTOS owned the organ and assured its future. The club enhanced the theatre itself with the purchase of a huge crystal chandelier that formerly graced the Genesee Theatre in Buffalo. Installed in the Riviera's main dome in January 1974, the chandelier measured 10 feet in diameter, 14 feet high, contained 15,000 French crystals and had 3 circuits of 35 bulbs each. A smaller chandelier that came from the Park Lane Restaurant of Buffalo was installed in the Riviera's outer lobby at the same time. Also, added to the stage equipment was a scenic backdrop donated from a Bradford (PA) Theatre. A historic grand piano was also acquired from the same theatre at the same time. The building was added to the National Register of Historic Places in April 1980. Changing economics threatened to shutter or destroy the theatre on numerous occasions, but it is now a great source of community pride for residents of the Tonawandas.

In 1988, the theatre was purchased by the NFTOS, now named the Riviera Theatre and Organ Preservation Society, Inc. (RTOPS), a 501(c)3 non-profit volunteer organization. The theatre was restored by volunteers and has been continuously operated by RTOPS since then under the direction of different managers.

The Riviera is most notable for its Mighty Wurlitzer Theatre organ, which was produced in North Tonawanda, once the home of the Rudolph Wurlitzer Company. In 2008, the organ was re-voiced and restored to nearly original condition, providing a new symphonic sound for concerts and events. The Riviera's Mighty Wurlitzer has provided more entertainment consistently in its original setting than most other Theatre organs, nationwide.

In 2014, the theatre's marquee was fully restored and modernized by Flexlume Sign Corp., and Wagner Signs. This included restoring the original paint colors, neon, and flashing lights. In place of the plexiglass letter board, two LED video screens now display upcoming events, the content of which was specifically created by the Riviera's design specialist, to imitate the grid and original metal lettering on the board.

In 2015, the Riviera upgrades to a Digital Cinema system to continue to play films, as 35mm films were phased out. This was made possible by grants and community donations.

Plans are underway for a capital campaign (Set The Stage), and 23,000 square feet (2,100 m^{2}). expansion of the theatre to include new production and patron spaces, new larger bathroom facilities, an elevator to the balcony level, as well as expanded lobby, bar, and concession facilities. The $6.1M expansion will also include a meeting space, rehearsal and black box theatre performance space to incubate arts groups from around the area.

== Leadership and staff ==
The Riviera Theatre is owned and operated by the Riviera Theatre & Organ Preservation Society, a 501c3 not-for-profit organization. It is led by a Board of Directors who consist of local community leaders and theatre volunteers.

The current professional staff consists of:

- David Fillenwarth - Executive Director
- Lindsay Pasquantino - Artist Relations & House Manager
- Christopher Mahiques - Controller & Human Resources
- Chuck Antolina - Technical Director
- Derek Heckler - Design Specialist (Marketing/Graphics/Lighting)
- Neal Brodfuehrer - Production Manager

== Gallery ==
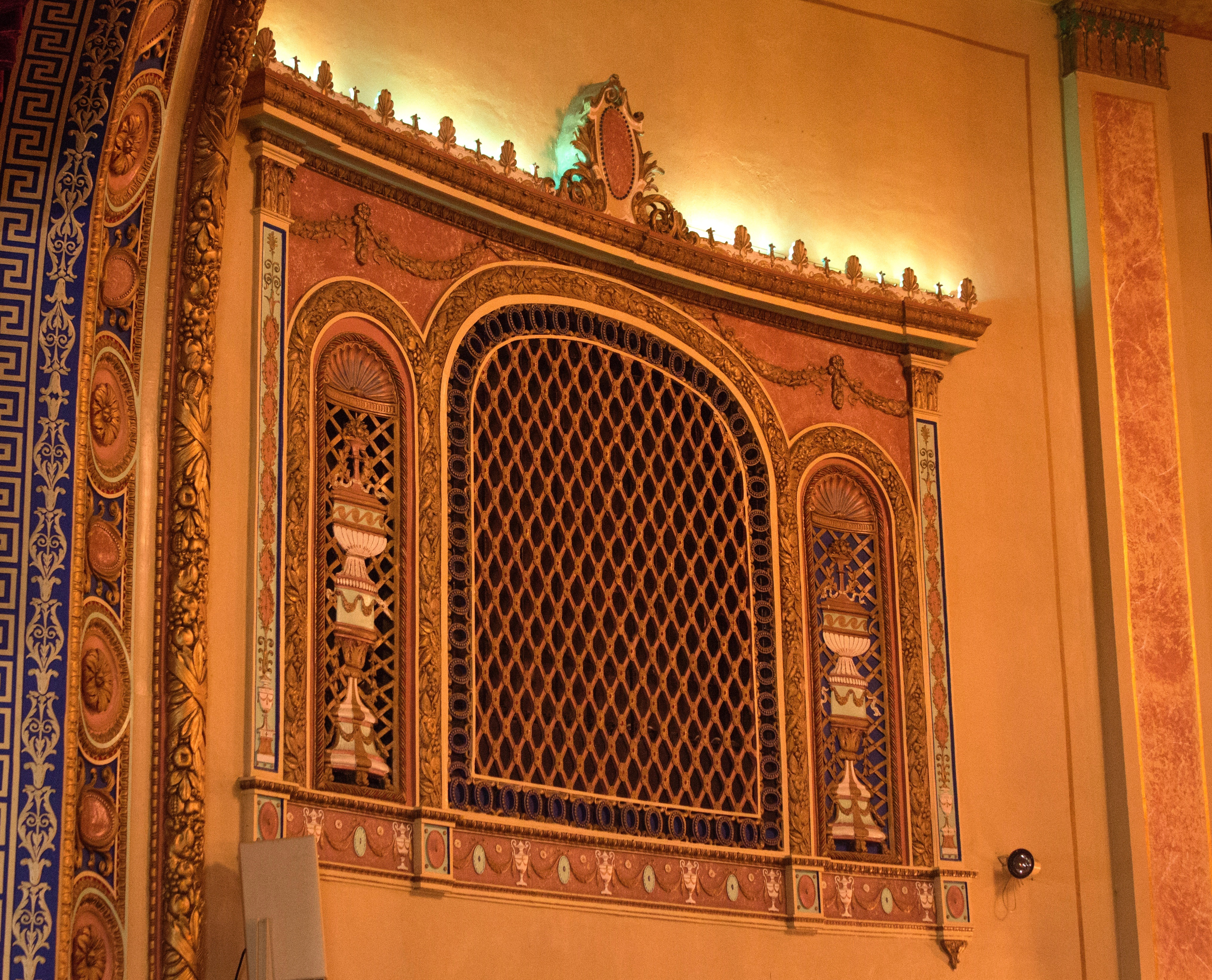
One of the two organ chambers for the Riviera's Mighty Wurlitzer.

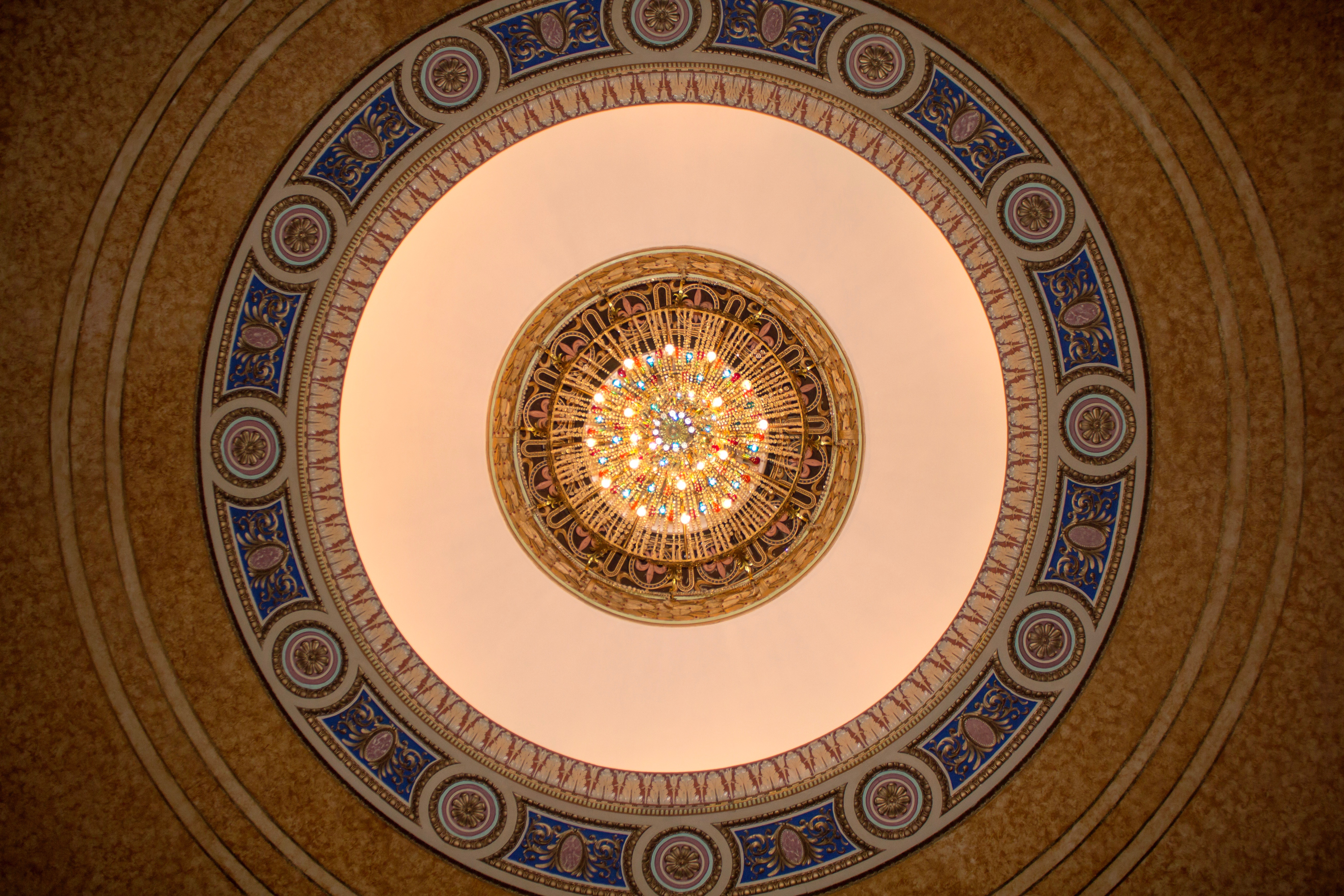
A shot of the Riviera's chandelier from underneath.

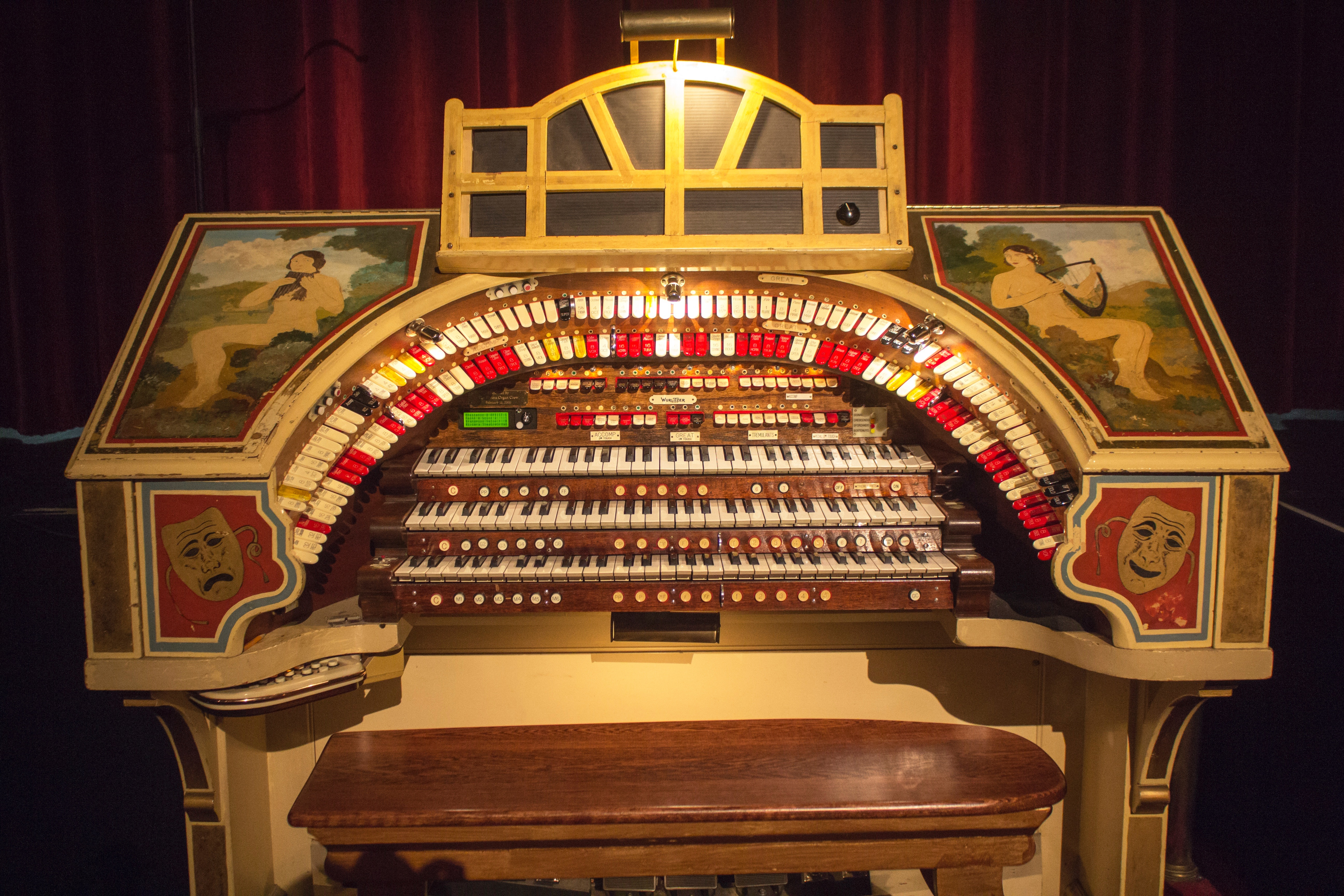
The Riviera's Mighty Wurlitzer theatre organ console. Original to the theatre and built in 1926.

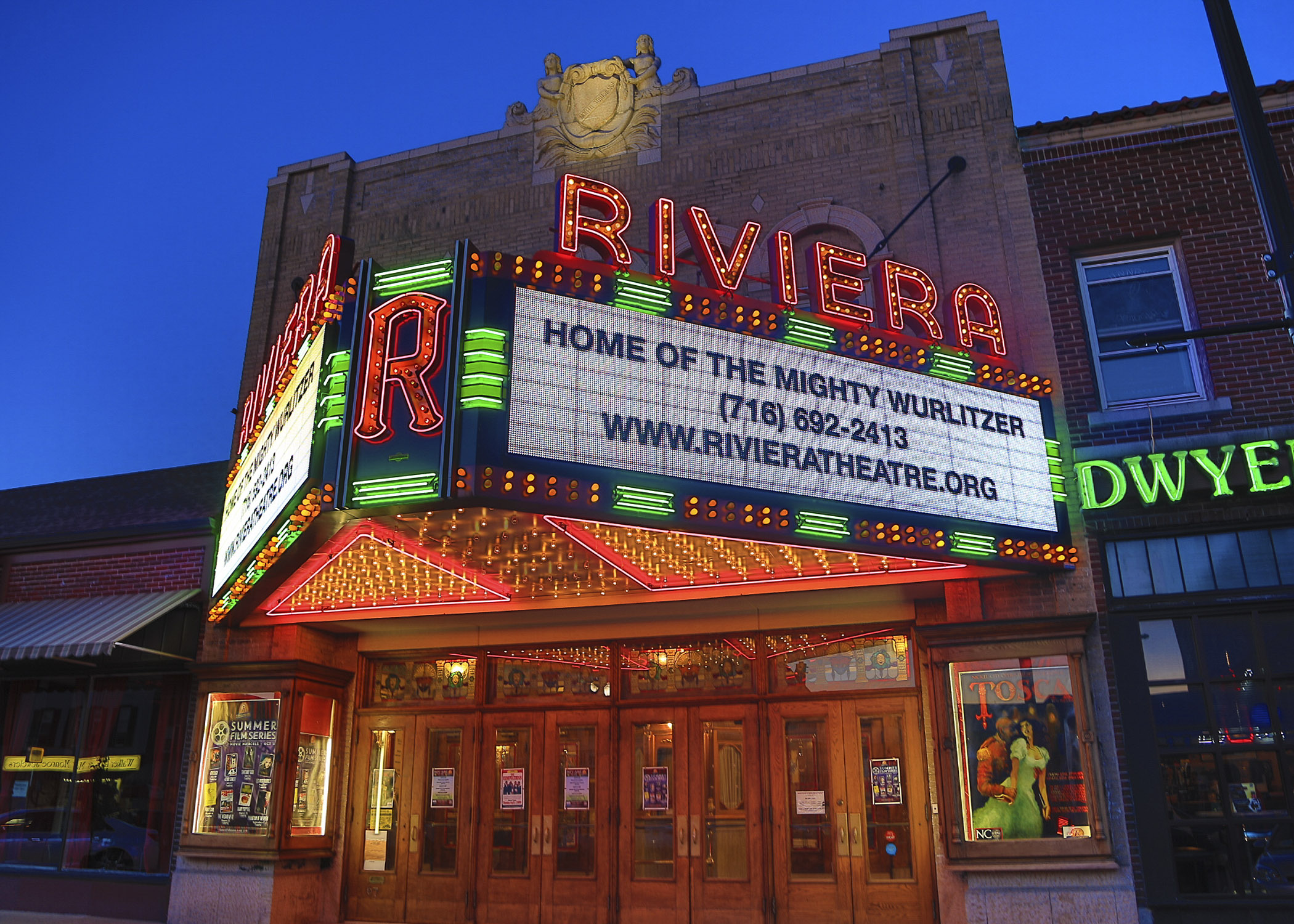
Fully restored and updated marquee.

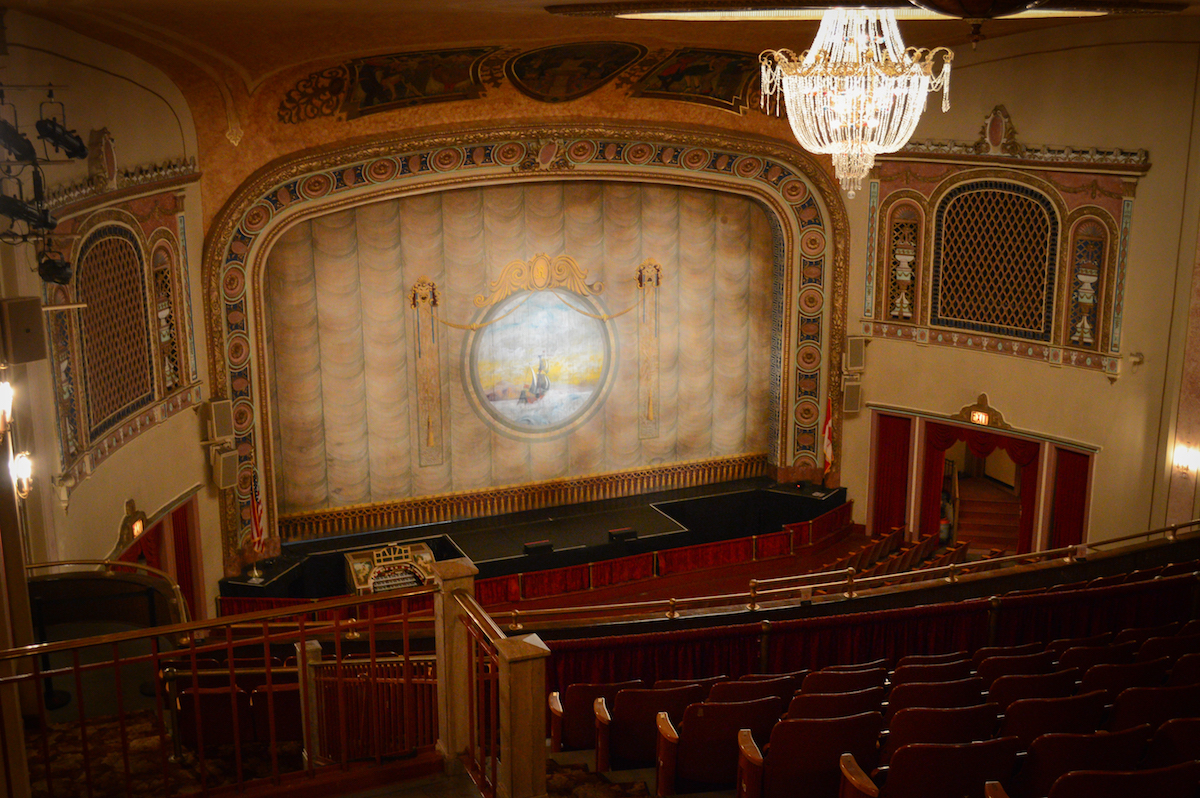
The Riviera's painted fire curtain.

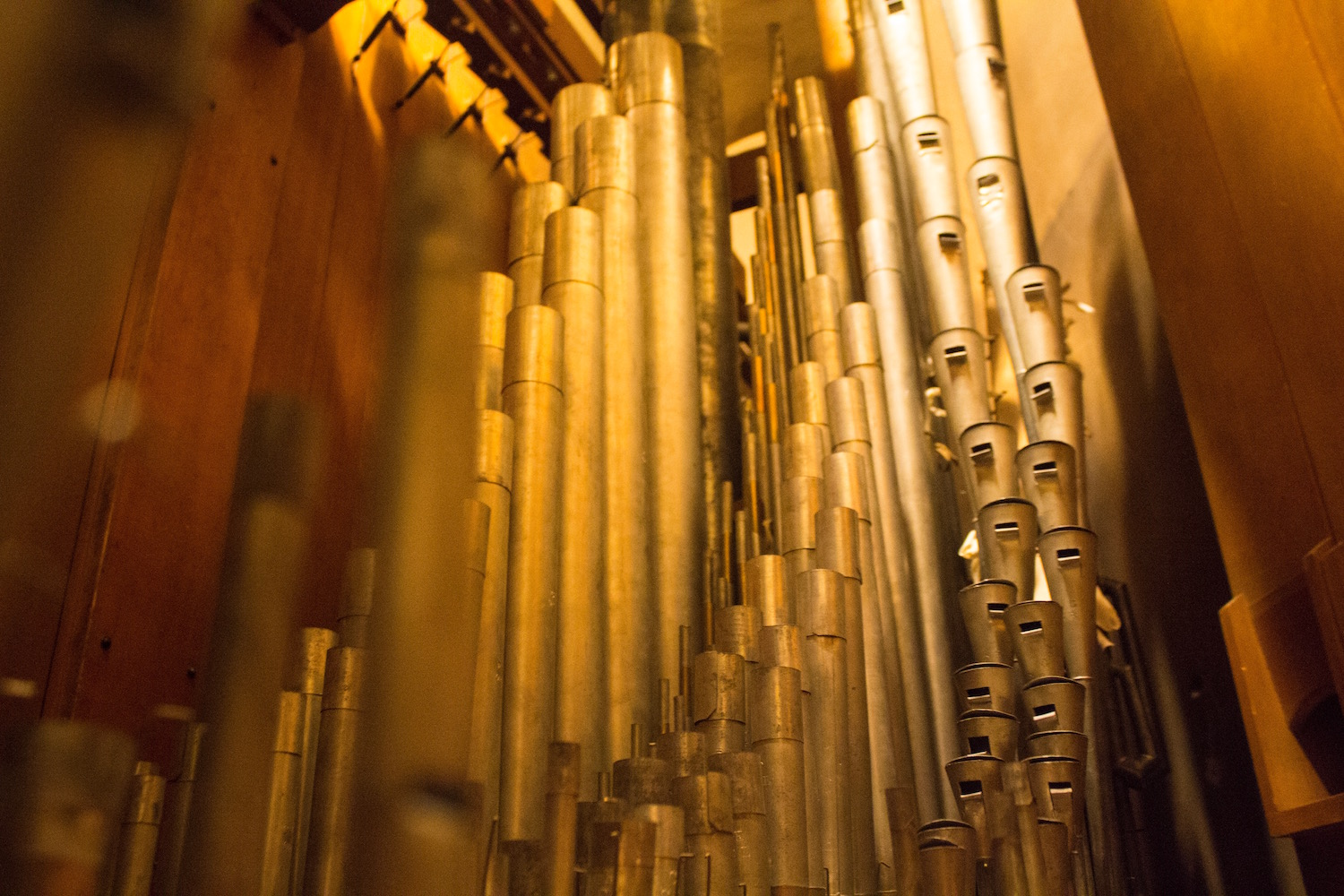
A detail view of one of the Mighty Wurlitzer pipe chambers.

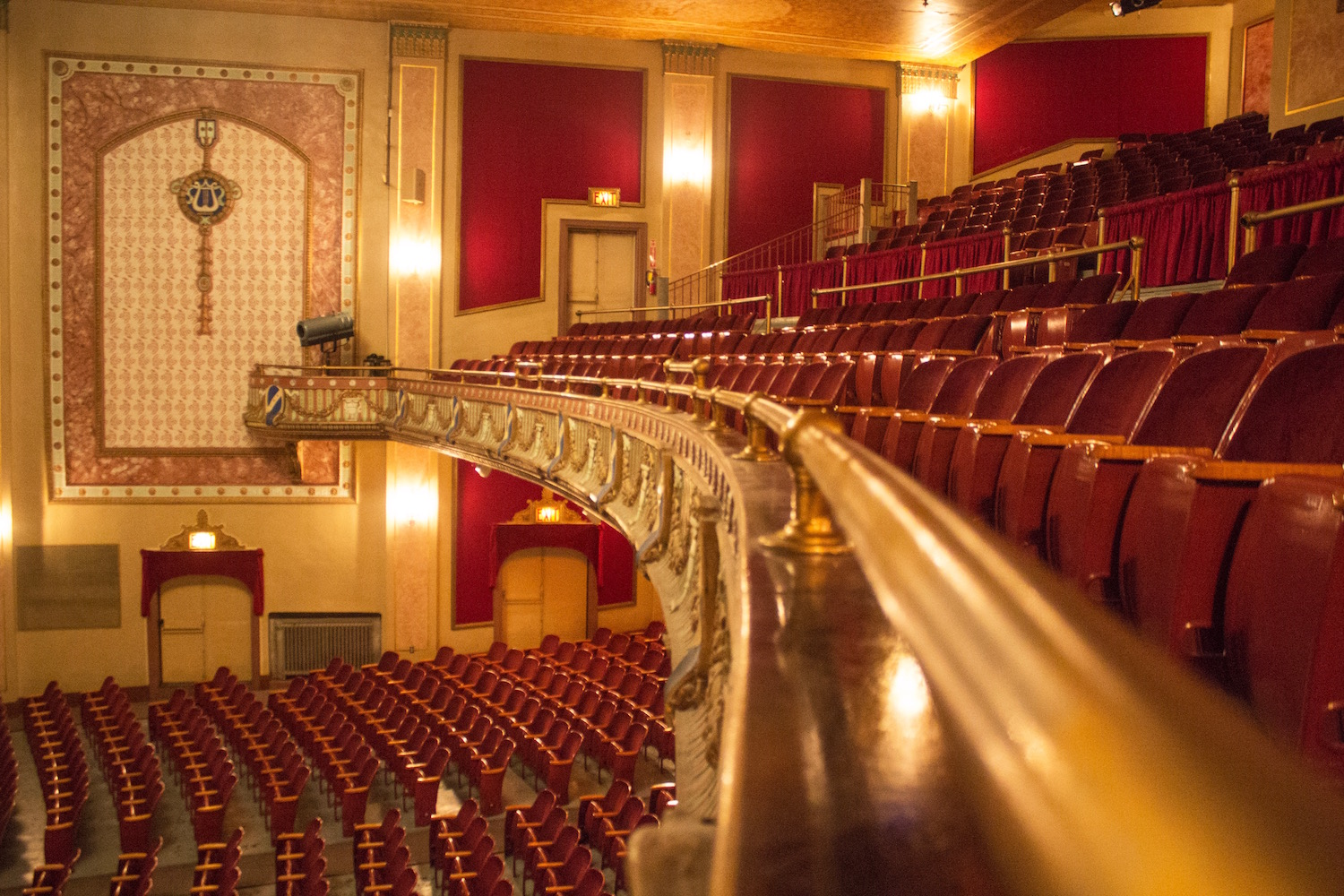
Looking down the loge level of the balcony.

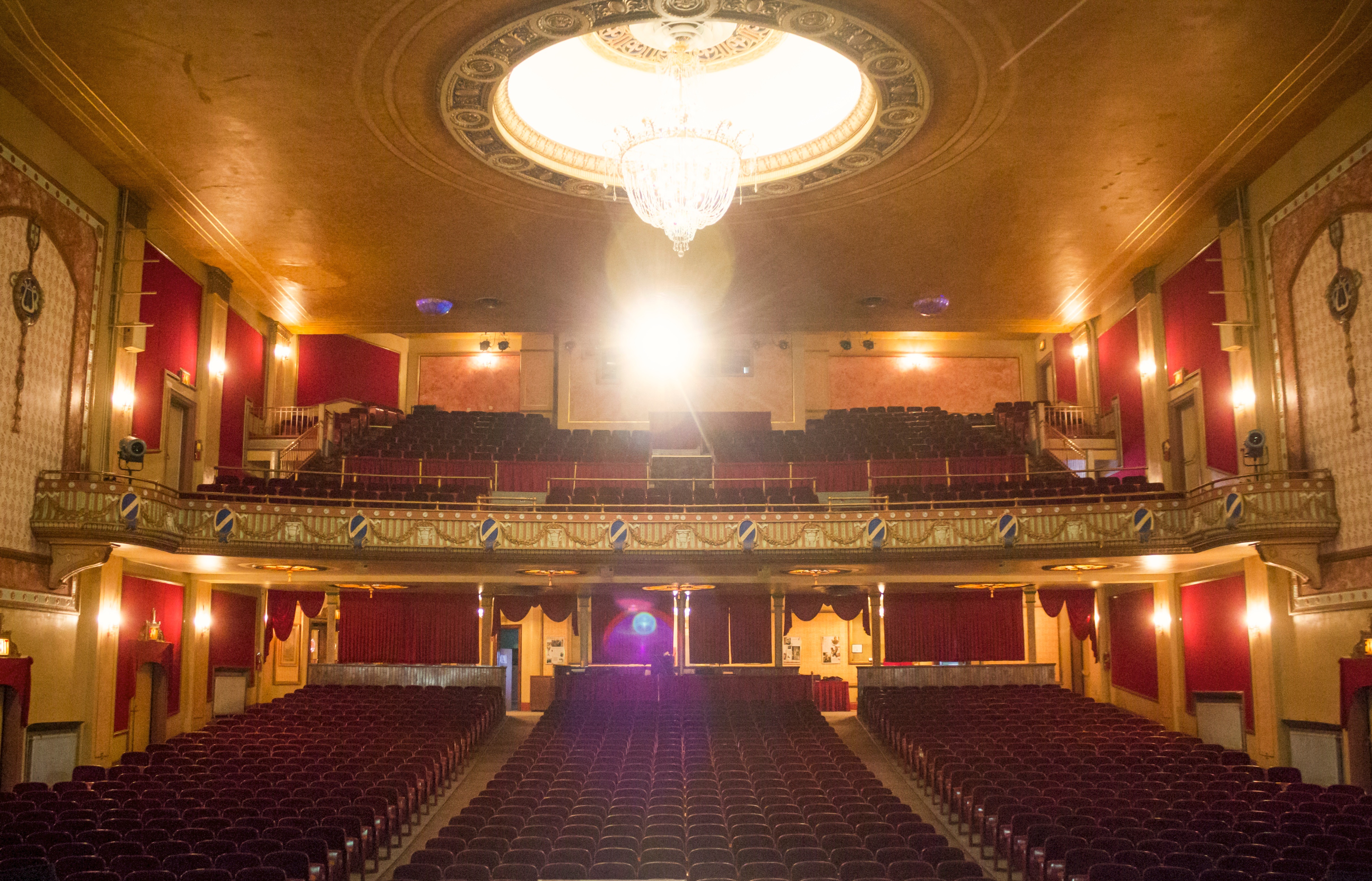
A view of the Riviera's house from the stage.

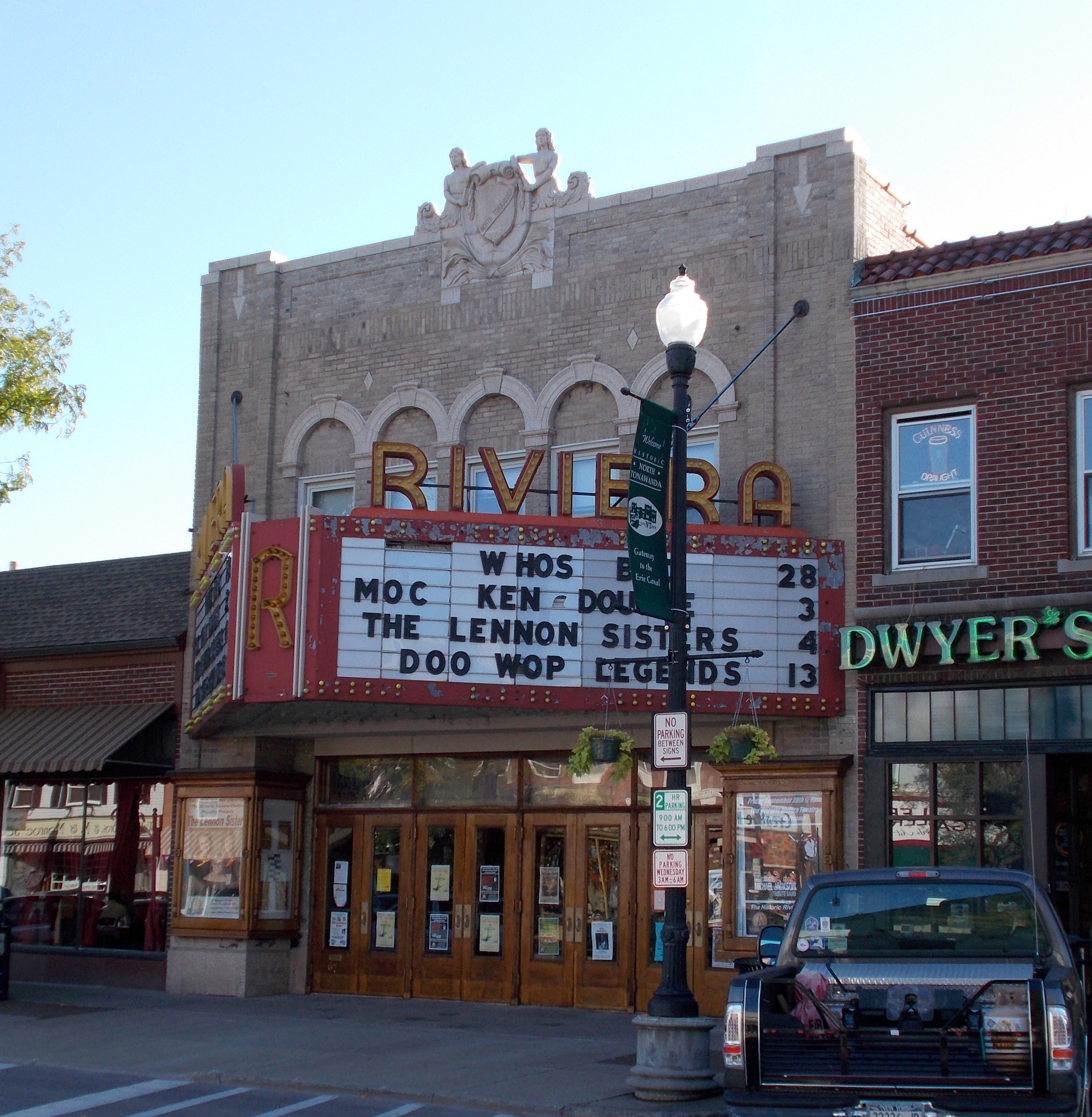
Exterior, September 2012

== See also ==
- Shea's Buffalo
- North Park Theatre
- National Register of Historic Places listings in Niagara County, New York
