= North Park Theatre =

Cinema in Buffalo, New York

- Shea's North Park
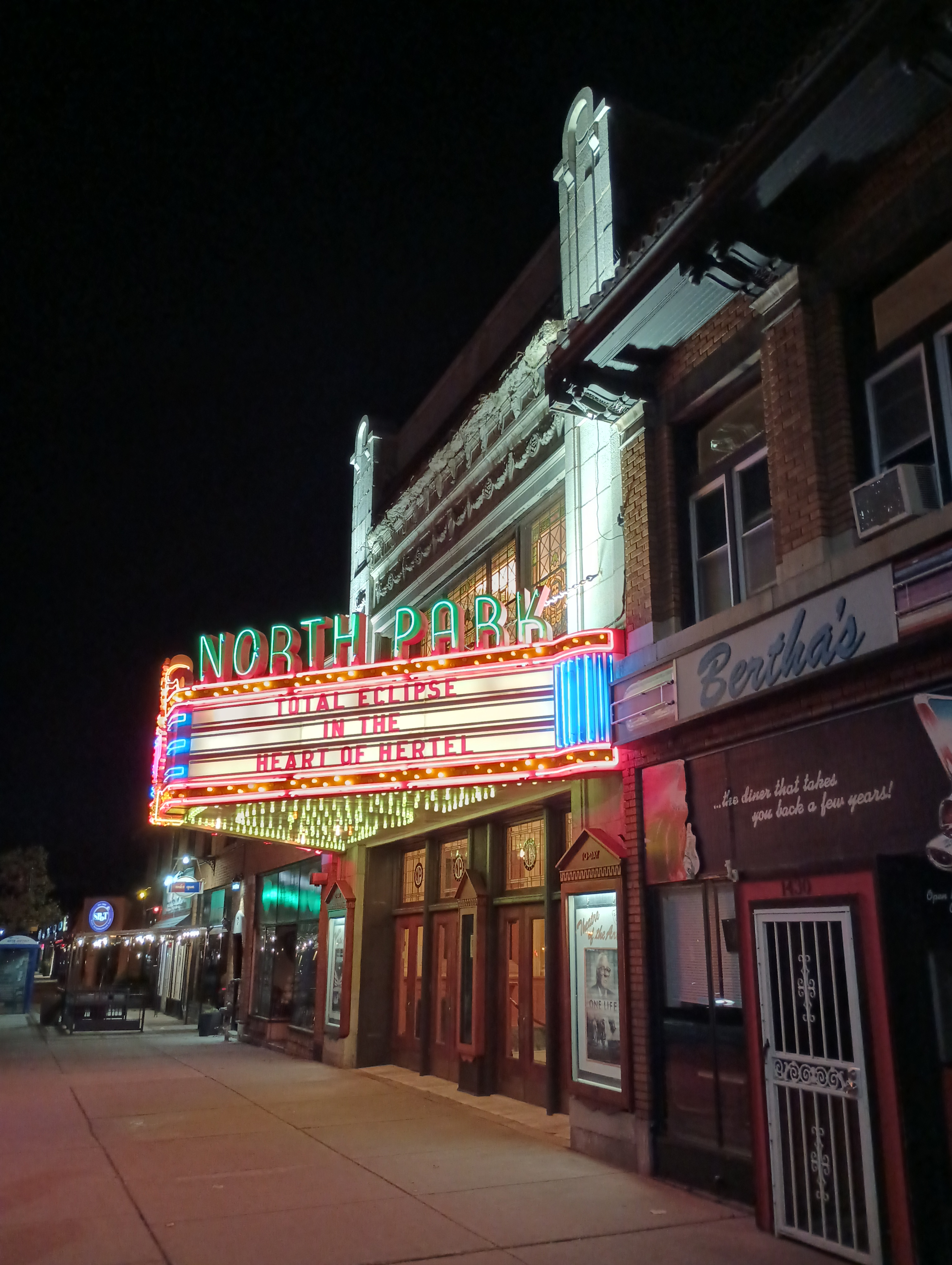
- The North Park Theatre in 2024
- Interactive map of North Park Theatre
- Address: 1428 Hertel Avenue; Buffalo, New York
- Coordinates: 42.94795°N 78.85529°W
- Owner: Thomas Eoannou
- Capacity: 850
- Public transit: NFTA Metro Rail (Amherst Street station)

Construction
- Opened: 1920
- Architect: Henry L. Spann

Website
- https://www.northparktheatre.org

The North Park Theatre is a historic single screen movie theatre in the North Park neighborhood of Buffalo, New York, United States. It has functioned as a cinema since it opened on November 21, 1920.

== History ==
Originally called Shea's North Park, the theatre, along with Shea's Performing Arts Center, serves as the remaining remnant of the now defunct Shea's theatre chain, once owned by early twentieth century businessman Michael Shea. Its design by Henry Spann was influenced by the neoclassical movement. The auditorium features a proscenium above the screen and a 5-paneled recessed dome arched into the ceiling, both decorated with murals by Raphael Beck.

The theatre was operated by Shea's until 1948, when Loew's Theatres took over the remaining assets of the company. It operated under the Loew's branding until 1963, when Western New York based theatre chain Dipson Theatres began operating the location for the longest period of time in the theater's existence, as it operated as a location under their management. The theater would operate under Dipson until June 2013, as Dipson announced it would not renew its lease.

Quickly after Dipson announced it would not renew its lease, a new ownership group formed by Buffalo defense attorney Tom Eoannou and local restaurant owner Mike Christiano announced plans to purchase the building. After their purchase, the theater closed for an eight-month restoration that included returning ornamental features such as the plaster dome and proscenium in the auditorium to their former glory, and a restored stained-glass window above the marquee that had long been hidden behind a concrete panel. The theater reopened on March 7, 2014, and to this day screens a mixture of first-run, specialty, and foreign films.

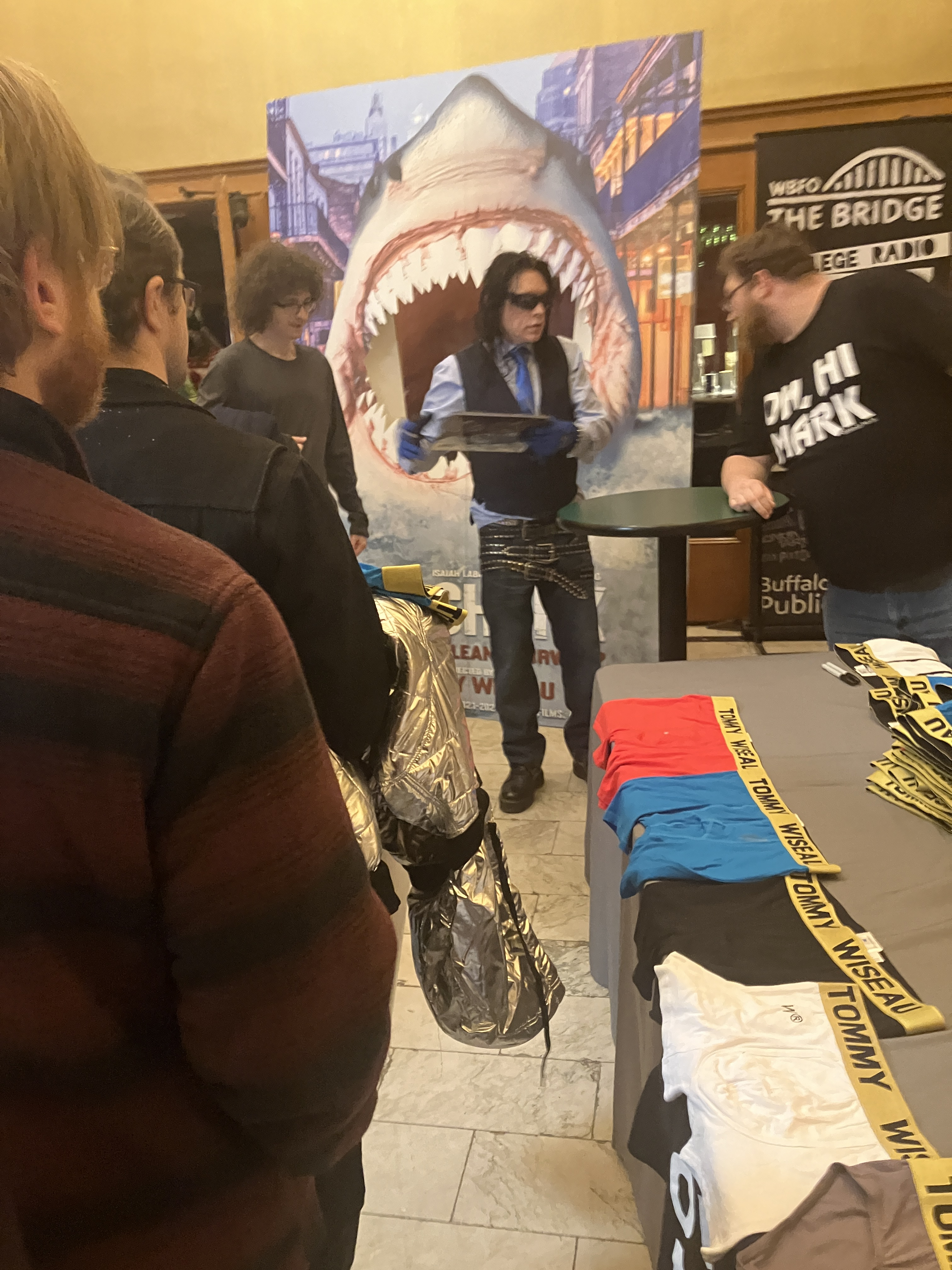
Tommy Wiseau at a screening of Big Shark and The Room at the theatre in 2024.

In March 2024, a crowdfunding campaign was started on GoFundMe for the theatre to obtain a new 4K laser projector and a new screen. The campaign was a success, and the new projector and screen were installed and put into use starting in May 2025.

== Movie Premieres ==
In June 1998, the North Park held the world premiere of Buffalo '66. This marked the first major film to premiere in Buffalo since The Natural opened in 1984. In attendance were Vincent Gallo, Christina Ricci, and Asia Argento.

The First Purge, which was filmed in 2017 in Buffalo, made its world premiere at the North Park in July, 2018, one day before its worldwide release, with the outside marquee stating the film's star was “The City of Buffalo”.

The theater hosted the Buffalo International Film Festival in October 2025 and the premiere for the documentary Baristas vs. Billionaires, produced by Alec Baldwin and Mark Mori, who were both in attendance.

== See also ==
- North Buffalo - neighborhood
- Riviera Theatre - historic theatre
