= Central Park, Buffalo =

Coordinates: 42.9441°N 78.8419°W

Central Park is a residential neighborhood in Buffalo, New York, United States. Its boundaries are Main Street to the east, Parkside Avenue to the west, Woodbridge Avenue to the north, and Amherst Street to the south, with its southwestern limit running along the railroad lining Linden Avenue. Amherst Street Station sits at Central Park's southeastern corner.

The neighborhood originated from a development conceived by cement magnate Lewis Jackson Bennett (1833–1925) on his Buffalo Cement Company property. His Central Park home was designed by Buffalo architect Milton Earl Beebe.

== Early development ==
Bennett bought land in North Buffalo for a limestone source needed to establish a cement factory. Starting in 1875 he also acquired land on the east and west sides of Main Street where there were cement deposits. In 1877 he established the Buffalo Cement Company, operating a quarry and manufacturing stone and cement. Ten years later he planned a residential subdivision on the company's lands with his son, Leslie Jay Bennett, and William Pierce, a co-owner of Buffalo Cement. They decided to call the area Central Park because of its geographic location near Delaware Park.

== Later developments ==
Central Park was in close proximity to the Beltline Railroad and a station was built in Central Park (at Starin and Amherst). Known as the Central Park Station, it was owned by Buffalo Cement and leased by New York Central Railroad and Hudson River Railroad.

The Otowega Club's clubhouse was located in the area at the corner of Linden and Starin. It was later used by the Art Institute of Buffalo before being demolished after World War II. Burke's Green initially was an unnamed parcel of park land deeded to the city by Bennett, with a beehive-style pile of rocks and a water pipe up that drizzled water over the rocks. Eventually this fountain was dismantled and an evergreen was placed in the center. Then, in the 1960s, the park was dedicated to the memory of F. Brendan Burke, and renamed Burke's Green. Bennett's house at 354 Depew Avenue was constructed in the area. It included 24 rooms and sat on 3 acres of land. It was demolished in 1935 and 12 building lots created.

Bennett donated the land on Main Street to the City for Bennett High School and All-High Stadium. Bennett led a fight that helped bring about a change from the "rate bill system" to a free public school system paid for by taxes, considered to be the first district to adopt that system. He was a life member of the Buffalo Society of Natural Sciences and Buffalo Historical Society, a member of the National Society of the Sons of the American Revolution, and a member of the Buffalo Chamber of Commerce. He named streets after his family and friends, including Morris Avenue for the family of Lewis Bennett's brother-in-law, John Vedder Morris, and the man's father, Abram Vrooman Morris. John Morris married Mr. Bennett's younger sister Maria Lydia Bennett in 1875. Depew Avenue was named in honor of Chauncey M. Depew, a US Senator, New York State Secretary of State, and President of the New York Central Railroad.

== See also ==
- Neighborhoods of Buffalo, New York

== Additional sources ==
- James Arnone Central Park, Buffalo, New York: A Neighborhood of History and Tradition. 2010.
- William Richard Cutter Genealogical and Family History of New York, Vol. 11, 1912
- The Village of Depew is Unique to the Area in that it Straddles Two Townships Depew Bee, July 14, 1994.
- Carol Wagner Bassett House: A History The Junior League of Buffalo, 1985.
