= Parkside West Historic District =

Historic district in New York, United States

- U.S. National Register of Historic Places
- U.S. Historic district
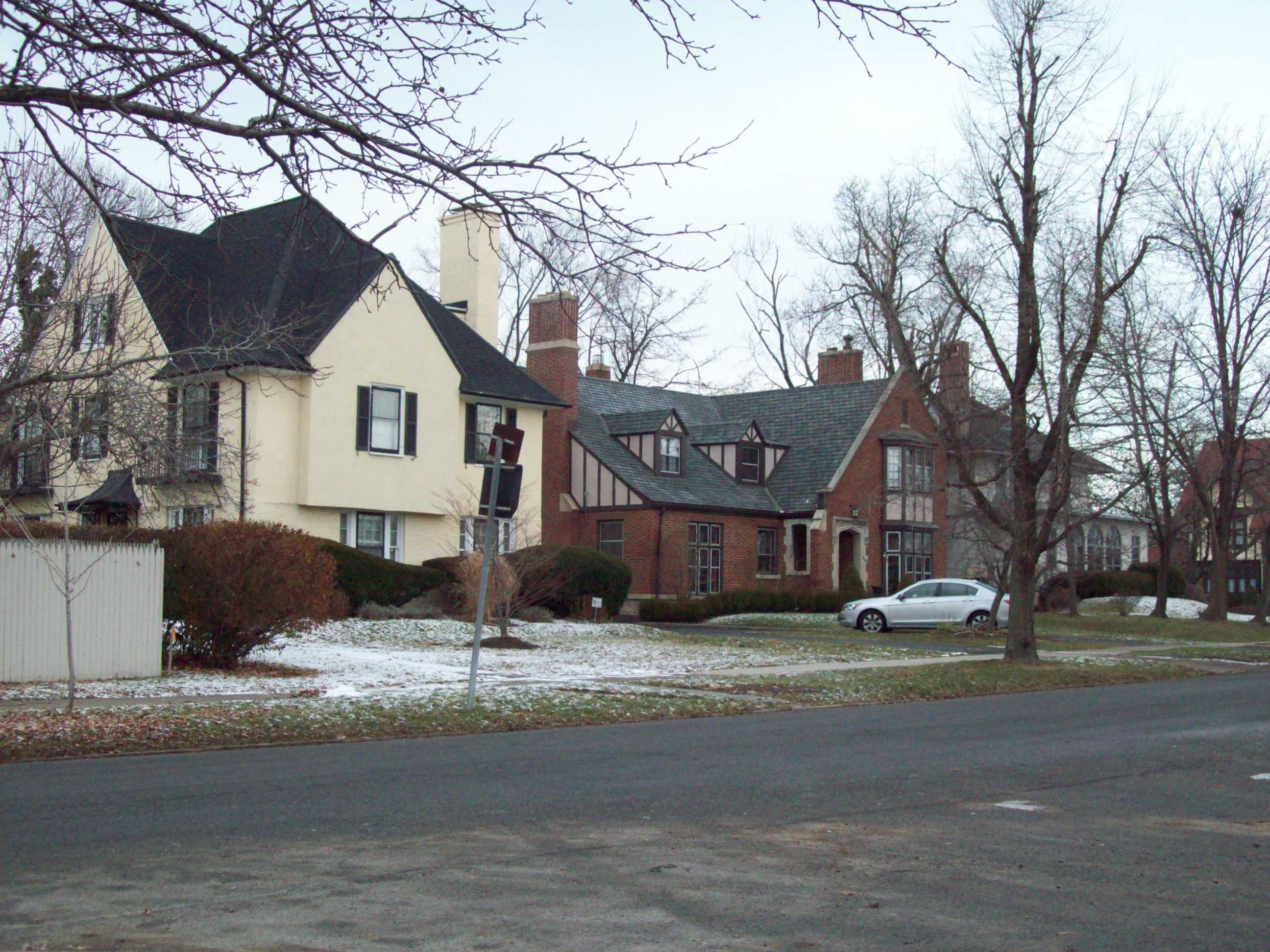
- Streetscape in Parkside West Historic District, December 2009

- Location within New York Location within the United States
- Location: Roughly bounded by Amherst St., Nottingham Terr., and Elmwood Ave. Buffalo, New York
- Coordinates: 42°56′15″N 78°52′1″W
- Area: 53 acres (21 ha)
- Built: 1876
- Architect: Olmsted, Frederick Law
- Architectural style: Colonial Revival, Tudor Revival, French Chateau
- MPS: Olmsted Parks and Parkways TR
- NRHP reference No.: 86003372
- Added to NRHP: December 10, 1986

Parkside West Historic District is a national historic district located at Buffalo in Erie County, New York. The district is architecturally and historically significant for its association with the 1876 Parks and Parkways Plan for the city of Buffalo developed by Frederick Law Olmsted in 1876. It consists of 137 contributing structures (82 principal buildings, 51 outbuildings) developed primarily from 1923 to 1940, as a middle class residential neighborhood. The district largely contains single-family dwellings, built in a variety of popular architectural styles, and located along the irregular and curvilinear street pattern developed by Olmsted. They include homes along Nottingham Terrace and Middlesex Road, and segments of Meadow Road, Lincoln Parkway, Delaware Avenue, and Amherst Street. The district is located to the north of Buffalo's Delaware Park.

It was listed on the National Register of Historic Places in 1986.
