= List of neighborhoods in Buffalo, New York =

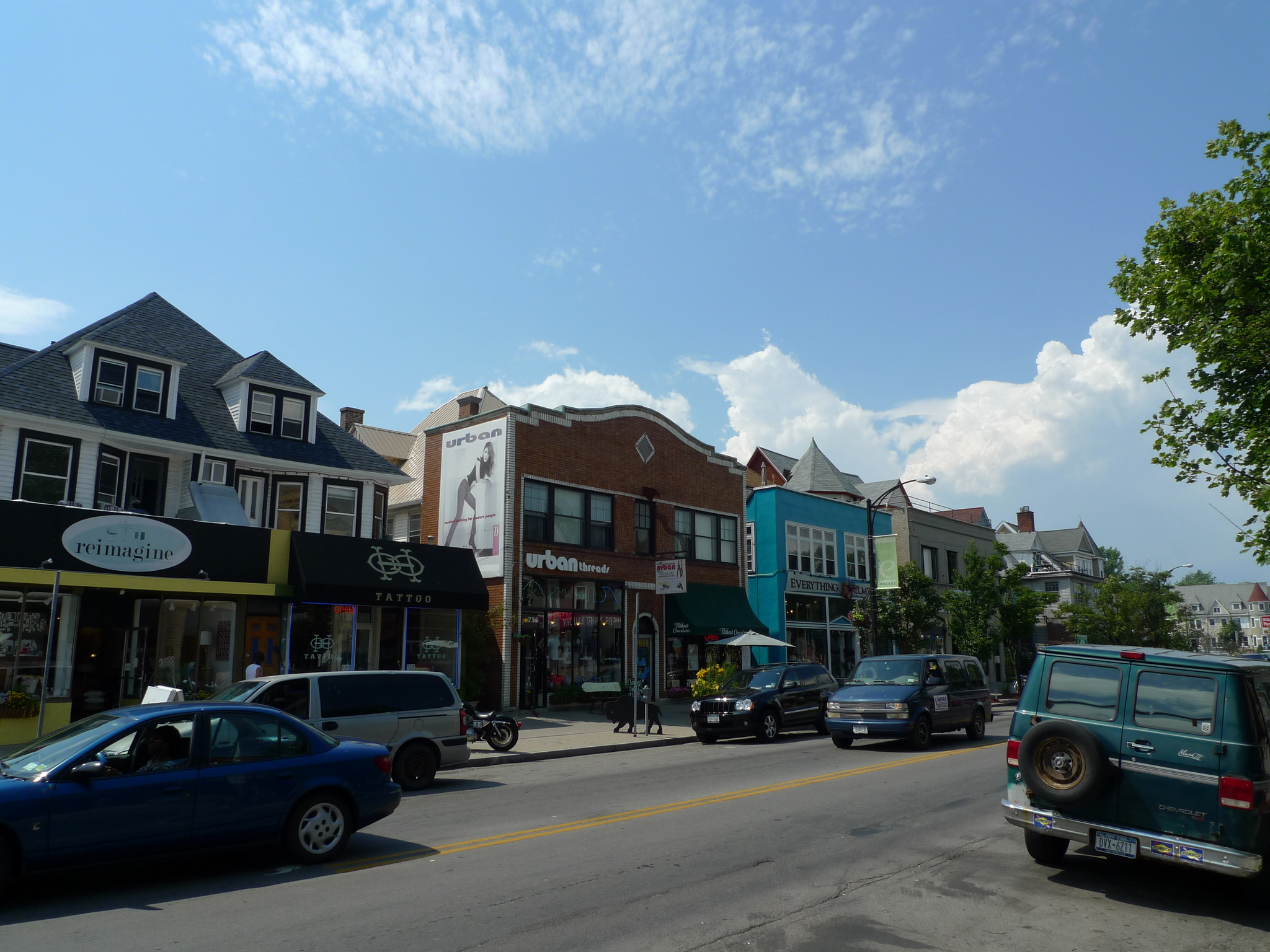
Elmwood Village

The city of Buffalo, New York, consists of five sectors of thirty-five different neighborhoods, over an area of fifty-two square miles.

== Background ==
The boundaries of Buffalo's neighborhoods have changed over time. The city is officially divided into five areas with each containing several neighborhoods; in total, there are 35 of them in the city.

Some neighborhoods in Buffalo have seen increased investment since the 1990s, beginning with the Elmwood Village. The redevelopment of the Larkin Terminal Warehouse in 2002 led to the creation of the Larkin District, home to several mixed-use projects and anchored by corporate offices. Downtown Buffalo and the central business district (CBD) saw a 10.6% increase in residents from 2010–2017 as over 1,061 units of housing came online, continuing into 2020 with the redevelopment of the Seneca One Tower. Other revitalized areas include Chandler Street in the Grant-Amherst neighborhood and Hertel Avenue in the North Park neighborhood.

In 2017, the Buffalo Common Council adopted its Green Code, which was the first overhaul of the city's zoning code since 1953. Its emphasis on regulations which promote pedestrian safety and mixed usage of land earned an award at the Congress for New Urbanism conference in 2019.

== Central ==
The Central sector contains Buffalo's Central Business District (locally known as "Downtown") as well as portions of the Outer Harbor.

== East ==
=== Hamlin Park ===
The Hamlin Park Historic District was listed on the National Register of Historic Places in 2013.

== North ==
=== Parkside ===
See Parkside East Historic District

=== Park Meadow ===
See Parkside West Historic District.

== South ==
South Buffalo, which was split by the construction of Interstate 190 during the 1950s, is troubled by the presence of a concrete crushing facility which is grandfathered in as a pre-existing use, while dust and truck traffic from the facility strongly affect residences in the neighborhood.

== West ==
=== Elmwood-Bryant (Elmwood Village) ===
The American Planning Association named the Elmwood Village neighborhood in Buffalo one of ten Great Neighborhoods in 2007. Elmwood Village is a pedestrian-oriented, mixed use neighborhood with hundreds of small, locally owned boutiques, shops, restaurants, and cafes. The neighborhood is located to the south of Buffalo State University.

=== Linwood Historic District ===
Runs along the entirety of Linwood Avenue from North Street in the south to West Delavan Avenue in the north.

=== Lower West Side ===
See West Village Historic District and Fargo Estate Historic District.
