= William Winthrop Kent =

American architect (1854–1912)

- Born: February 26, 1860; Bangor, Maine
- Died: November 6, 1955 (aged 101); Hyannis, Massachusetts
- Education: Harvard University
- Occupation: Architect
- Spouse: Jessie Adams (m. 1887; died 1950)
- Children: 5
- Relatives: Edward Austin Kent (brother)
- Buildings: Cathedral of St. John the Divine

William Winthrop Kent (February 23, 1860 – November 6, 1955) was an American architect who studied under H. H. Richardson and was one of the designers of Cathedral of St. John the Divine in New York City.

== Early life ==
Kent was born in Bangor, Maine on February 23, 1860. He was a son of Harriet Ann (née Farnham) Kent (1830–1908) and Henry Mellen Kent (1823–1894). Kent moved with his family to Buffalo after the American Civil War, where his father, Henry, opened a successful department store, Flint & Kent. Among his siblings was fellow architect Edward Austin Kent, who died aboard the Titanic in 1912, and Charles Farnham Kent, who died aged 22 in Denver, Colorado.

He graduated from Phillips Exeter Academy in 1878 and Harvard University in 1882. At Harvard, he was friends William Roscoe Thayer and Owen Wister. He was a moving spirit in the establishment of The Harvard Lampoon, undergraduate comic magazine, and a member of the Hasty Pudding Club

== Career ==
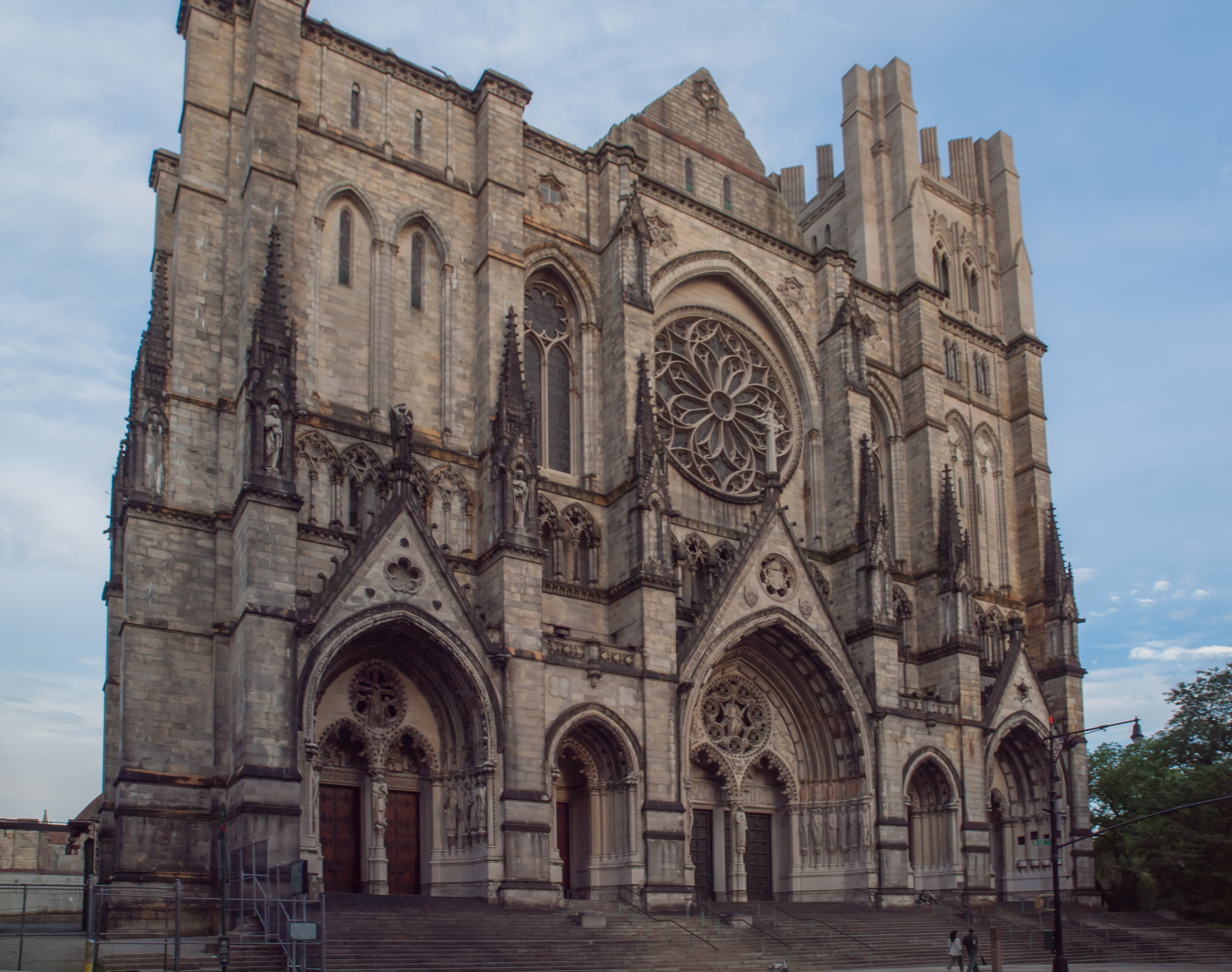
Cathedral of St. John the Divine

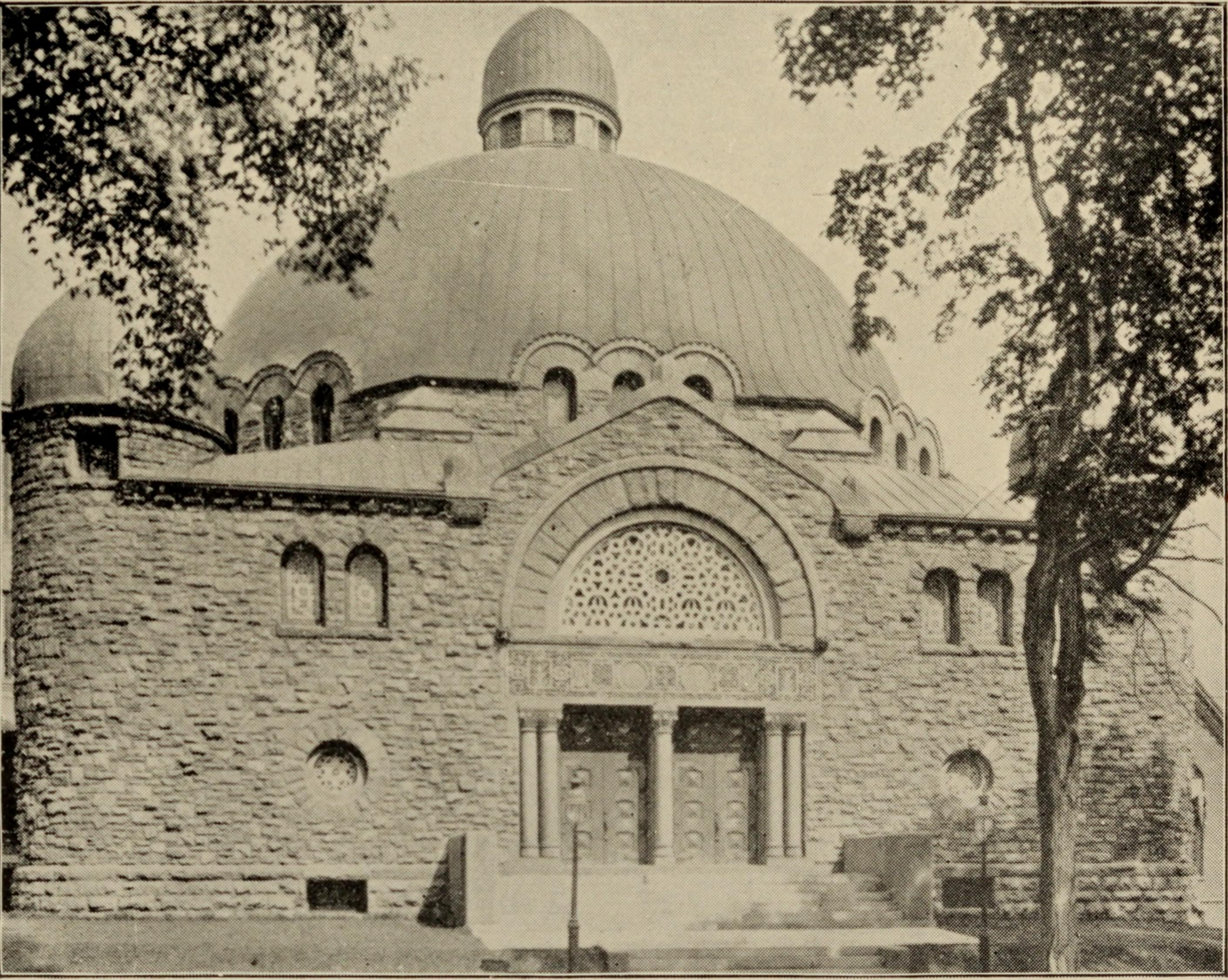
Temple Beth Zion, 1896

Architectural Wrought Iron

Kent was a student of H. H. Richardson in Boston, Massachusetts. Kent supervised the construction of the residence of historian Henry Adams at 1603 H Street in Washington, D.C., next door to the mansion of John Hay. He was one of the designers, along with George Lewis Heins and Christopher Grant LaFarge, of the design for Cathedral of St. John the Divine in New York City. To Kent's consternation, he was initially not recognized as a co-collaborator, and would not be acknowledged as such until the following year.

In Buffalo, he was affiliated with his brother Edward and designed Temple Beth Zion, as well as the Unitarian Church of Our Father. He was affiliated with David and John Jardine in the firm Jardine, Kent & Jardine, who built many office buildings and private residences throughout New York. They also designed a number of Carnegie libraries in Minnesota, New Jersey, Pennsylvania and Washington. In 1909 John and Kent were joined by Clinton Murdock Hill, an architect who had previously been a partner in the Boston firms of Bacon & Hill and Hill & James. In 1911 the firm was renamed Jardine, Kent & Hill to reflect Hill's partnership. That firm was active in the rebuilding of downtown Bangor, Kent's hometown, after its Great Fire. Kent retired from practice in 1912.

Kent traveled to Europe regularly and authored a number of articles for magazines including on research into Italian works of the Renaissance, including about Baldassare Peruzzi. He was the author of Architectural Wrought Iron with Henry R. Towne, the Handbook of Hardware for Architects and the Schools of Ornament. He was a member of the American Institute of Architects, as well as the N.Y. Chapter, the Architectural League of New York, the Delta Kappa Epsilon fraternity, Hasty Pudding Club.

=== Notable works ===
- Cathedral of St. John the Divine (built 1892)
- Temple Beth Zion (built 1890; destroyed 1961) – erected in the Byzantine style at 599 Delaware Avenue in Buffalo, as a copper-domed synagogue. Destroyed on October 4, 1961, when a fire, fueled by flammable liquids being used to refinish the pews, destroyed the building.
- Unitarian Universalist Church of Buffalo (built 1906) – erected in the English Gothic style at 695 Elmwood Avenue in Buffalo and listed on the National Register of Historic Places on June 30, 2015.
- Bronxville Village Hall (built 1906), was designed by Kent and William A. Bates.

== Personal life ==
On December 8, 1887 in Buffalo, Kent was married to Jessie Adams (1862–1950), the youngest daughter of James Adams. Together, they were the parents of:

- Agnes Mellen Kent (1888–1975), who married Umberto Olivieri. They divorced and she married actor Hans Schumm in 1931.
- Winthrop Kent (1891–1981), who married Margaret H. Higgins, a daughter of Harvey A. Higgins, general manager of the Standard Tool Company of Cleveland, in 1920.
- Katherine Kent (b. 1894), who married Charles Billings Gleason, a son of Dr. W. Stanton Gleason, President of the New York State Medical Society, in 1916.
- Charlotte Austin Kent (1897–1998), who never married.
- Frances Adams Kent (1899–1975), an artist and actress; she married Robert Patterson Lamont Jr., son of Robert P. Lamont, the U.S. Secretary of Commerce.

He was a resident of Lawrence Park in Bronxville, New York and served as a trustee of village of Bronxville for a number of years. He lived at 26 Prescott Avenue, a Victorian Tudor home, was built in 1896 out of stone and wood that was later the home of artist William T. Smedley. His summer home was at Orleans on Cape Cod for fifty-five years until shortly before his death when he began spending winters in Bermuda. Their home was in an area now known as Kent's Point that "sits between Pleasant Bay and Frost Fish Cove." Although he never held office, he was an Independent Republican and a member of the Unitarian Church.

His wife died in Boston, Massachusetts on August 4, 1950. Kent died at Cape Cod Hospital in Hyannis, Massachusetts on November 6, 1955.
