= Bruce Beyer =

American war resister

Bruce Lindsay Beyer
- Bruce Beyer being arrested, 1968
- Born: Earl Bruce Lazarus; August 21, 1948; Wilkes-Barre, Pennsylvania
- Died: April 15, 2019 (aged 70); Cheektowaga, New York
- Education: Bennett High School (Buffalo, New York), Paul Smith's College
- Occupation: Carpenter
- Organization: Veterans for Peace
- Known for: Opposition to United States involvement in the Vietnam War
- Movement: Buffalo Nine
- Criminal charges: Assault
- Criminal penalty: 30 days jail
- Spouse(s): Heather Elizabeth Nelson (m. 1970), Mary Biggie Beyer (1990s-2019)
- Parent(s): Joe Tipton (biological father), Robert Beyer (adoptive father), Pamela Lazarus (biological mother), Elizabeth Beyer (adoptive mother)

Bruce Lindsay Beyer (21 August 1948 – 15 April 2019) was an American anti-Vietnam War activist and draft resister known for his involvement in the Buffalo Nine, a group of anti-war protesters arrested at the Unitarian Universalist Church of Buffalo in August 1968.

Beyer was convicted of assaulting federal officers during his arrest and sentenced to three years in prison. His conviction sparked student protests at the University at Buffalo.

While appealing his conviction, Beyer fled the United States, receiving asylum in Sweden before settling in Canada, where he lived near Bancroft, Ontario, from 1972 to 1977. He returned to the United States in October 1977, accompanied by former U.S. Attorney General Ramsey Clark and other supporters. His original prison sentence was subsequently reduced to 30 days.

== Early life and education ==
Bruce Beyer was born as Earl Bruce Lazarus on 21 August 1948 in Wilkes-Barre, Pennsylvania, to 18-year old Pamela Lazarus and baseball player Joe Tipton. He was an descendant of the 18th century military leader Benedict Arnold.

Biological father, Joe Tipton, 1951, Japan.

He was adopted by Elizabeth Beyer (née Joline) and Robert Beyer and given the name Bruce Lindsay Beyer. Both adoptive parents were United States Armed Forces veterans. Robert Beyer served as Japanese-language codebreaker during the World War II. Elizabeth Beyer served for 30-years in the U.S. Army. Robert Beyer was a Republican and a conservative.

Bruce Beyer was christened in Unitarian Universalist Church of Buffalo in 1948 (although he was not religious as an adult). Robert Beyer was church elder at same church.

Bruce Beyer, six foot three inches tall, graduated from Bennett High School in 1966. He studied forestry at Paul Smith's College but didn't finish, as he was drawn to anti-war activism. He was thrown out of Manlius Military School.

== Adult life ==
Beyer worked as a night clerk at the Imperial 400 Hotel in Buffalo, New York. During the "long, hot summer of 1967", journalists and activists based themselves at the hotel, where Beyer made friends with jazz musician Jimmy Smith. He told The Public newspaper about his time working on Buffalo's East Side:

"I drew parallels between the [Vietnam] war and racial injustice".

In October 1967, Beyer set up an underground railroad, which helped 30 to 40 Americans draft dodgers flee to Canada. Beyer became the leader of the Buffalo Draft Resistance Union, and gave speeches at the University at Buffalo, although he was not enrolled there.

=== War draft refusal (1967 – 1970) ===
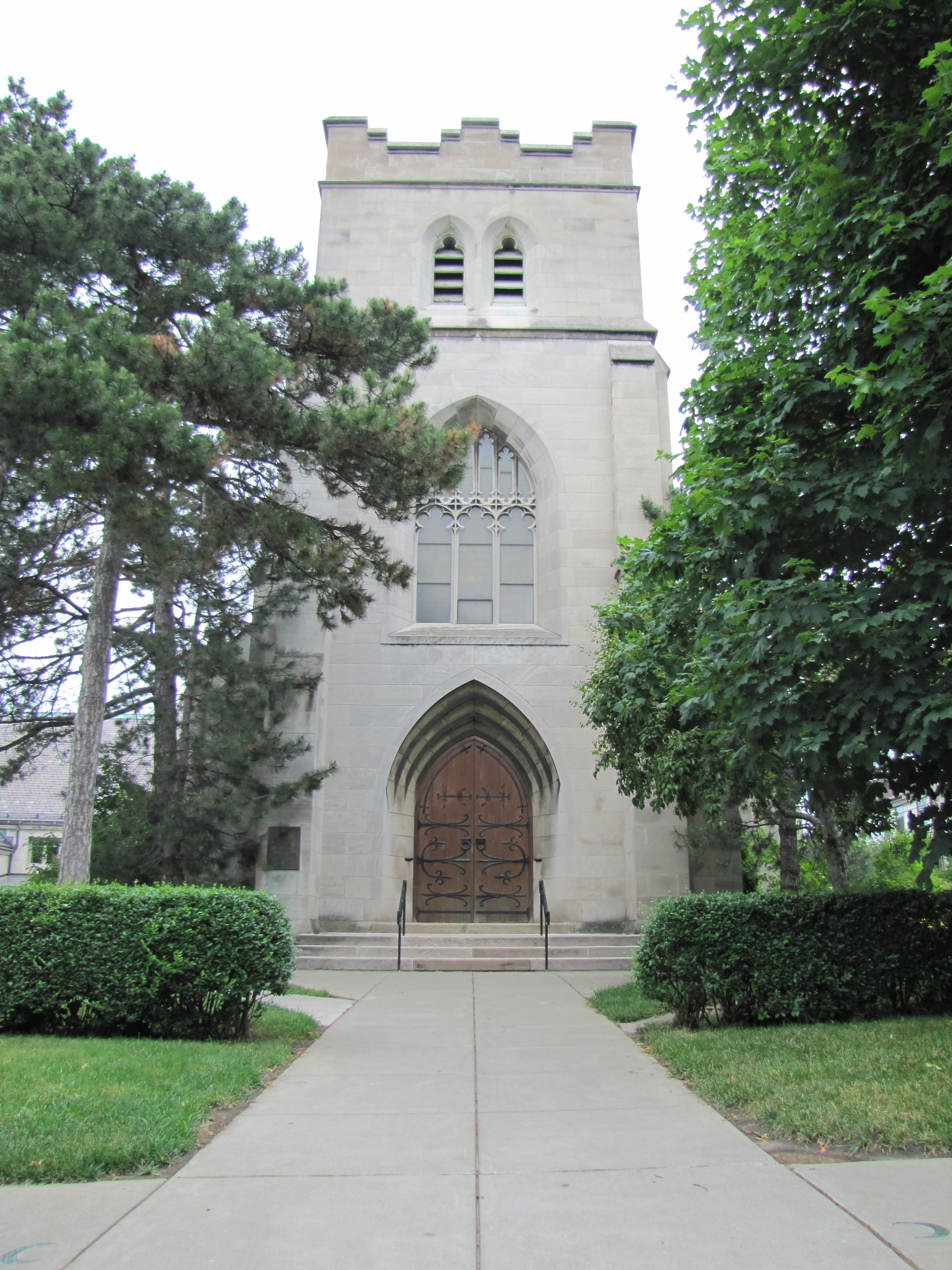
Unitarian Universalist Church of Buffalo, 2011

As the United States government conscripted people for the Vietnam War, the draft board classified Beyer as 1-A (available for unrestricted military service). On October 20, 1967, Beyer refused to enlist and was one of 994 people who dropped their draft papers on the steps of the Justice Department (which was then led by Ramsey Clark).

Beyer subsequently received three more draft orders to report to join the military and symbolically burnt draft papers on 7 August 1968 on the steps of the Unitarian Universalist Church of Buffalo, where he and his friend, Bruce Cline, then sought sanctuary from police arrest. Beyer and his family had attended the church for years, and the congregation voted to offer him the sanctuary. During his time in the church, the Federal Bureau of Investigation surveilled the church and identified Beyer as group leader.

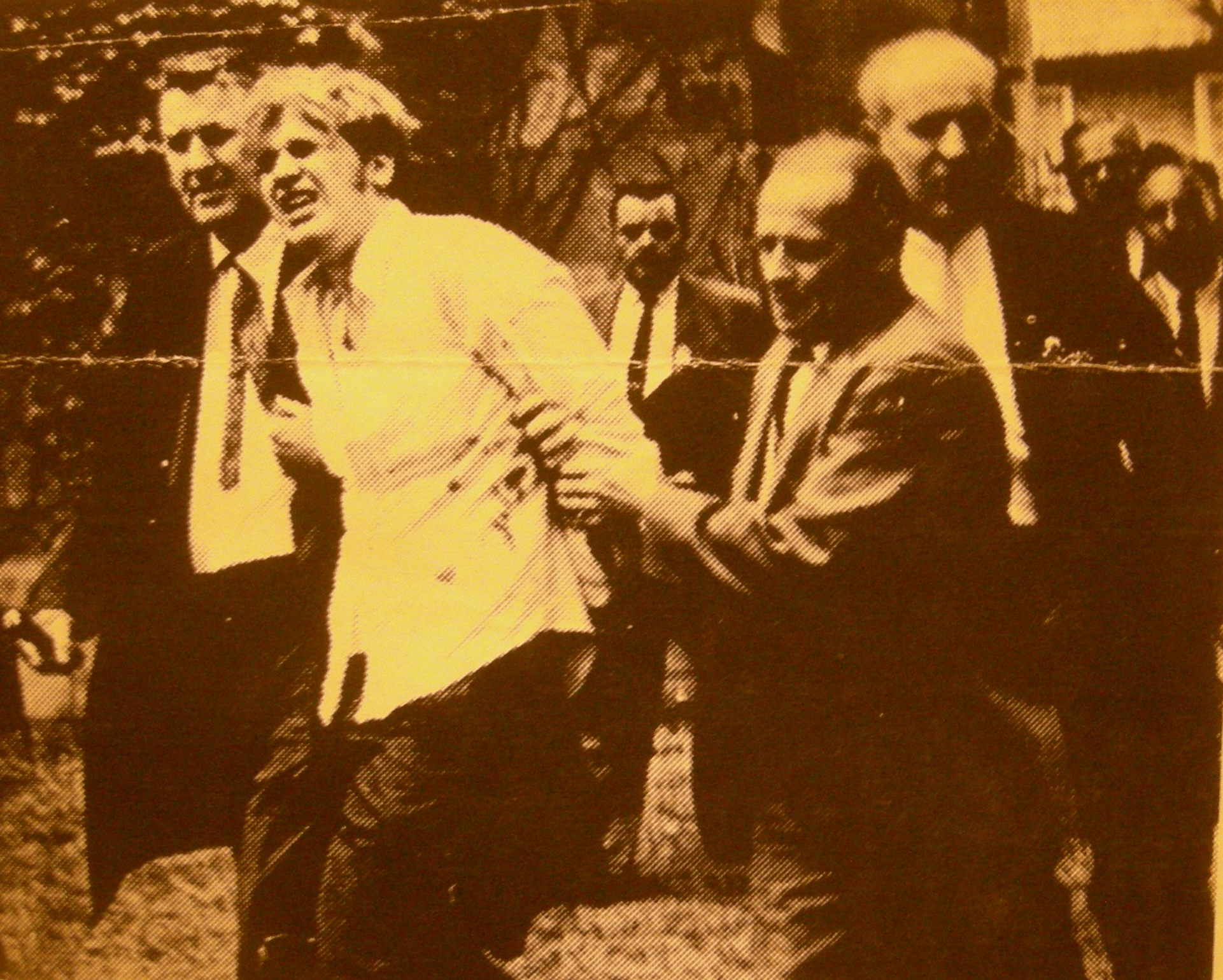
Beyer's 1968 arrest

Beyer was indicted for selective service violation on 14 August 1968. After failing to appear at court on August 19, a warrant for his arrest was issued. The warrant was enforced the same day. While hundreds of supporters were encamped around the church, 32 federal marshals and FBI agents, backed up by a hundred Buffalo police officers, stormed the church, and arrested Beyer and others. Fellow arrestees were Gerald J. Gross, Raymond D. Malak Jr., Carl Kronberg, and four others. The nine anti-war activists became known as the Buffalo Nine, and included four military veterans. During his arrest, Beyer was struck on the head with a baton, had a broken nose from being punched, and his finger was broken. Blood was visible on the back of his head, while he was being led out of the church by authorities. While being apprehended, Beyer punched one officer and bit the thumb of another.

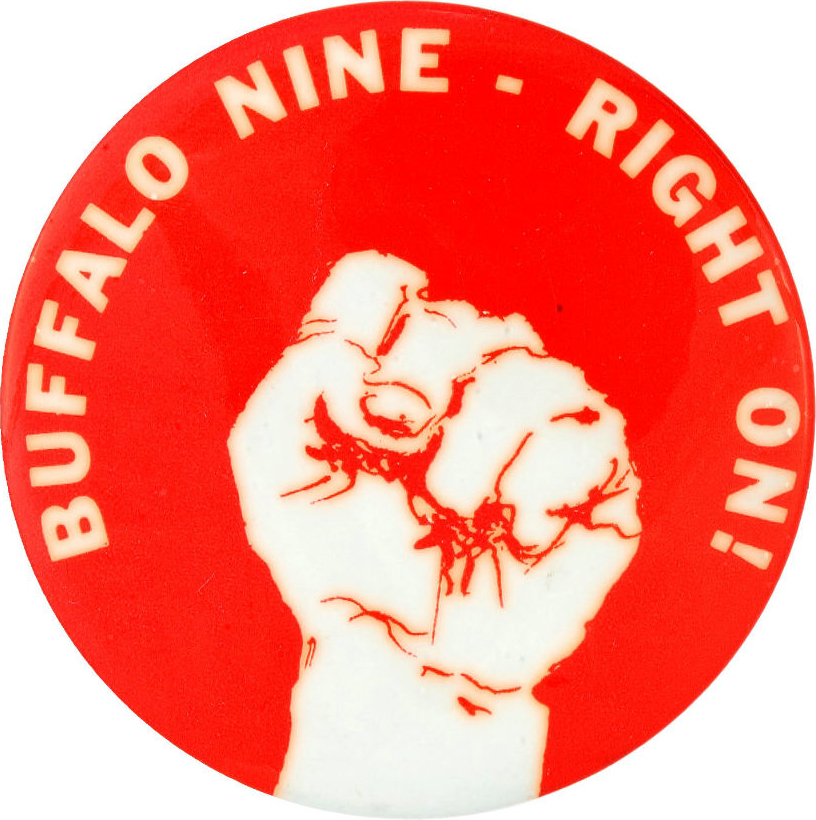
Buffalo Nine pin, 1960s

Beyer was indicted a second time by a federal grand jury on 19 August 1968, and accused again of draft evasion and also assaulting police officers.

Beyer and three other members of the Buffalo Nine faced trial in 1969. Juries were selected on 17 February 1969. Edgar C. NeMoyer prosecuted the case, Michael John Kennedy and Gerald B. Lefcourt defended Beyer. As a nonreligious person, Beyer was unable to satisfy the requirements of being a conscientious objector to the war. Judge Alois Mazur released Beyer on bail of $100.

On 19 March 1969, Beyer was tried and found guilty of assault. Judge John T. Curtin sentenced him for 3 years and released him on a $5,000 bail, to allow for an appeal. Protests to the verdict occurred the same day. Buffalo University student protesters occupied Hayes Hall, which then housed the university's senior administrators and president. Chants from the crowd included "Free Bruce Beyer". Seven people from the crowd of more than 250 protesters were arrested.

=== Sweden and Canada (1970 – September 1977) ===
On 6 March 1970, Beyer fled from Buffalo to Montreal, Canada, but could not complete his planned his onward journey to Sweden, without a passport. Stuck in Canada, Beyer stayed with his girlfriend, a America-Canadian woman named Heather Elizabeth Nelson. Beyer then fraudulently obtained a Canadian passport, using the alias Stephen Brandon.

Stockholm City Hall

In August 1970, Beyer left Canada for Sweden, where he was the first Vietnam draft dodger to receive political asylum for crime (assault) other than draft evasion. His adopted father forfeited his $5,000 bail bond.

In Sweden, the Beyers lived at the YMCA and worked odd jobs and was a counsellor for the Buffalo Draft Resistance Union. In Sweden, Beyer married Heather Elizabeth Nelson in Stockholm's City Hall, and he got a Swedish passport.

In the spring of 1972, the United States Court of Appeals for the Second Circuit upheld Beyer's three-year sentence. The same Spring, the Beyers returned to Canada, initially living in Toronto, Ontario.

While in Toronto, the couple lived at the National Casket Company's former factory on Niagara Street. In Toronto, Bruce worked with the Committee of Young Canadians and did social work for youth at Opportunity House on Broadview Avenue. In 1972, Heather started having lesbian relationships.

In 1972, the Beyers bought a 100-acre farm near Bancroft, Ontario where Bruce lived with Mary Sherwood. Bruce Beyer lives there from 1972 until 1977, and he described himself as being part of the back-to-the-land movement. In Bancroft, Bruce Beyer worked as a carpenter. Beyer stated in 2017, that a freedom of information request informed him that the Royal Canadian Mounted Police were reporting his Beyer's employment history to the FBI.

In 1974, Beyer attended the second conference of American exiles, organized by the Union of American Exiles (AMEX) organization in Toronto.

Later, in 1978, Heather sold her ownership share in the farm having spent travelling time with a girlfriend. Heather moved to Seattle to work as a tattoo artist and changed her name, to Lamar Van Dyke.

=== Return to United States (October 1977 – 1978) ===
As Beyer considered his return from Canada to the United States, he was provided by legal support by Ramsey Clark. Clark was the U.S. attorney general when Beyer refused the draft, and had visited Vietnam after his term ended and had become opposed to the Vietnam War.

Beyer returned to Buffalo, New York on 20 October 1977. He crossed from Canada to the U.S. across the Peace Bridge, walking in a group with Marine Corps veteran Colonel Edward J. Miller, his lawyer Ramsey Clark, author Gloria Emerson, Patricia Simon of American Gold Star Mothers, and his adopted father. At his press conference, the same day, he expressed "thanks to the people of Sweden and Canada for letting thousand of war resisters in their country".

Beyer expected to be jailed, but Judge John T. Curtin chose not to jail him. Beyer quoted Judge Curtin as saying:

"Mr. Beyer, I’m going to let you go home. I’m not going to require you to post bail and I expect you will present yourself in court when required to do so."

In 1977, Beyer was described a "Buffalo's most publicized draft dodger" by columnist Bob Curran in The Buffalo News. WKBW-TV described him as "the most celebrated draft dodger."

In 1978 year later, Judge Curtin later vacated Beyer's three-year sentence and imposed thirty days of jail. Having served 19 days in 1970, Beyer spent 11 more in Erie County Correctional Facility.

=== Aftermath and later life (1979 – 2019) ===
Buffalo Nine Reunion Statement, 1988

Beyer continued to advocate against war in his adult life, became Christian, and was a member of Veterans for Peace. He expressed remorse for his use of violence during his arrest and that he did not fight the draft dodging charges.

Back in Buffalo, Beyer joined the International Alliance of Theatrical Stage Employees union. He worked as stagehand, and continued his carpentry. running the Wood-butcher's Shop on Clinton Street and got into home renovations.

In the early 1980's, Beyer bought a warehouse in the early 1980s and lived with his aging adopted parents.

Around 1991, Beyer married his second wife, Mary Biggie Beyer, and they lived in Lackawanna. Beyer Mary had daughters, Amy Rodriguez and Bridget Baumer, and a son named Brian. The Beyers also raised Bruce's daughter from his earlier marriage, Liz (Elizabeth) Beyer Partin. From his children, Bruce Beyer had seven grandchildren, including Elizabeth's daughter, Emslie and a grandchild called Bruce Beyer.

Jerry Gross, William Berry, Bruce Beyer, Carl Kroneberg (2013)

In 2015, Beyer took DNA test, done amidst cardiac health issues. Results of the test led to Beyer reconnecting with his extended family and learning that his father was the baseball player Joe Tipton. Beyer already possessed a copy of his birth certificate, but it lacked his father's name, and indicated only his mother, Pamela Lazarus Thomas, who died in 2012. Beyer learned details about his mother, only after her death. She gave birth to him at the age of 18, and was from Wilkes-Barre, Pennsylvania. Beyer's biological father, Joe Tipton, died in 1994.

In 2017, Beyer returned to the same steps of the Justice Department to commemorate his original rejection of the draft.

== Death ==
Bruce Beyer died on 15 April 2019 at Hospice Buffalo, Cheektowaga, New York. He died from complications of congestive heart failure.

== See also ==
- List of peace activists
- Vietnam War resisters in Canada
