= Brunswick Four =

Women arrested in Canada in 1974

The Brunswick Four were four lesbians involved in a historic incident in Toronto, Ontario in 1974. The four were evicted from the Brunswick House, a working-class beer hall on Bloor Street, and subsequently arrested, and three were later tried in Ontario Court for obstruction of justice. Two of those three women were acquitted in May 1974, but one, Adrienne Potts, served three months probation.

== Importance of the incident ==
Gay historian Tom Warner believes that the arrest and its consequences was a key incident ushering in a more militant gay and lesbian liberation movement in Canada, much as the Stonewall Inn riot politicized gays and lesbians in the United States. Warner also notes that this was one of the first occasions that a gay or lesbian topic received extensive press coverage in Canada.

== In the tavern ==
On January 5, 1974, Adrienne Potts (now Adrienne Rosen), Pat Murphy, Sue Wells and Heather (Beyer) Elizabeth performed a song at amateur night at the Brunswick Tavern. Their chosen song, "I Enjoy Being A Dyke" (a parody of "I Enjoy Being a Girl", a song by Rodgers and Hammerstein from the musical play Flower Drum Song) drew the attention of the bar's owner. Their version of the song challenged the unwanted male attention they were receiving at the bar that night, exemplified in this verse: “When I see a man who’s sexist and does something that I don’t like, I just tell him that he can Fuck Off, I enjoy being a Dyke!”

The four were asked by the owner to leave the premises. They refused to leave, and were arrested by 8 uniformed police officers. The lesbians alleged verbal and physical police harassment as a result of the incident.

== Arrest and trial ==
Although they were not charged with a crime, to protest their arrest they refused to leave the police station. The police forcibly ejected the Four from the police station, punching Potts in the back of the head and throwing her to the ground. According to historian Kelly Phipps, "They returned to the Brunswick House hoping to find witnesses, but were met by two uniformed police officers, two bouncers, and two plainclothes detectives. Again, they were tossed in an unmarked car and taken back to the station. During the five hours of processing their paperwork, police officers amused themselves with remarks such as, “I bet you drive a tug boat” and “Did you ever put your finger in a Dyke?” The arrest and subsequent trial received coverage in The Globe and Mail, the Toronto Star, and a number of smaller community papers and magazines. The three women, Pat Murphy, Adrienne Potts (now Rosen) and Heather Elizabeth were represented by lawyer Judy LaMarsh, who was a former Liberal cabinet minister. LaMarsh represented them pro bono because she was outraged by the treatment they endured at the hands of the police.

== Community response ==
Warner describes the "anger and concern" of the Toronto gay community, and notes that a public meeting was called at which the "Brunswick Four minus One Defense Fund" (named so because only three people were arrested; Susan Wells was not) launched.

Three of the Brunswick Four were charged, and two of the women were acquitted in May 1974. One of the four; Adrienne Potts, served three months probation.

== Toronto Police Officers Charged with Assault ==
After the trial, Potts, Murphy and Elizabeth charged the arresting officers with assault. The charges were laid by the Crown after the three women produced evidence in the form of doctor's notes and photographs of extensive bruising.

Unbeknownst to the women, the police officers had exchanged their hats and the badge numbers that established their identities were confused. At trial, because of this trick, the women couldn't accurately identify the officers.

Murphy, Potts and Elizabeth refused to participate in the trial, calling it a scam and miscarriage of justice.

When the court clerk ordered everyone to rise for a recess the women refused to rise. The clerk ordered the court to rise a second time. They refused. They were then charged with criminal contempt of court and led to the cells at Old City Hall.

Potts and Elizabeth returned to court hours later to apologize but Murphy refused earning 30 days in jail.

The officers were acquitted. Later, The Royal Commission on Toronto Police Practices ordered the three to appear and Murphy and Elizabeth gave testimony. Potts (now Rosen) moved to Vancouver and refused to participate.Pat Murphy died in 2003. Heather Elizabeth (Lamar Van Dyke) lives in Seattle and Adrienne Potts (Rosen) lives with her family in Toronto.

== Toronto Police Services Apology ==
On November 2, 2024 Chief Myron Demkiw of the Toronto Policy Service apologized to the Brunswick Four at a Serving with Pride Gala.

== See also ==
- Lesbophobia
- Homophobia
- Van Dykes
