= Gerald Ross (disambiguation) =

Gerald Ross is a musician.

Gerald Ross may also refer to:

- Jerry Ross (painter) (born 1944, Gerald)
- Jerold Ross (1926–1955), composer

== See also ==
- Jerry Ross (disambiguation)
- Gerard Ross (disambiguation)
