= Jerry Ross =

Jerry Ross may refer to:

- Jerry Ross (painter) (born 1944), Gerald, American painter and anti-war protestor previously known as Gerald J. Gross
- Jerry Ross (composer) (1926–1955), Jerold, American lyricist and composer
- Jerry L. Ross (born 1948), U.S. Air Force officer and former NASA astronaut
- Jerry Ross (record producer) (1933–2017), American songwriter and producer, founder of Heritage Records

== See also ==
- Gerald Ross (disambiguation)
- Gerard Ross (disambiguation)
