= Brunswick House (Toronto) =

Former pub in the Toronto, Canada

Coordinates: 43.665834°N 79.407195°W

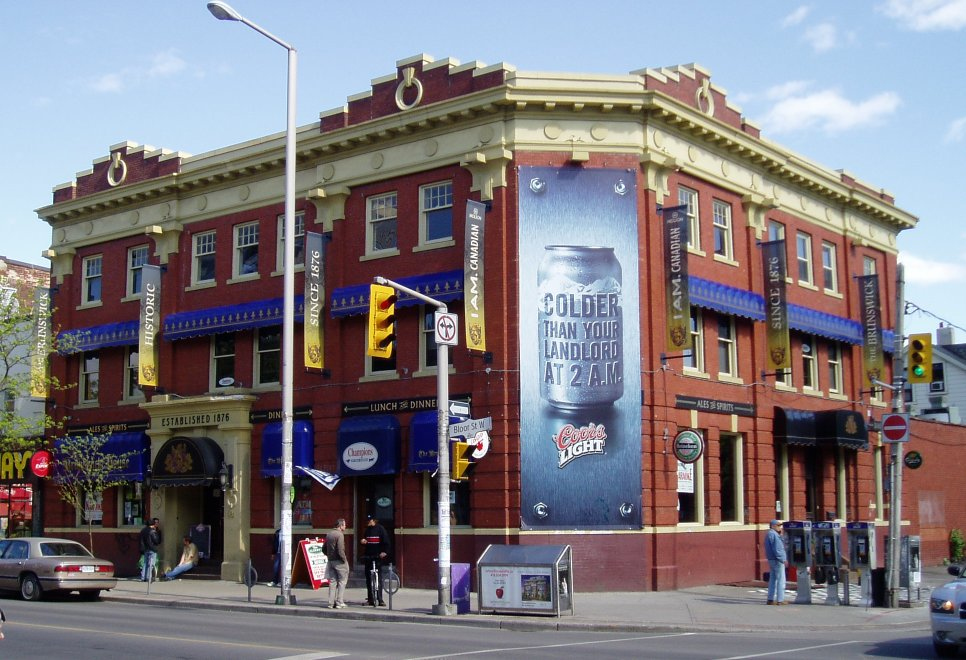
The refurbished Brunny

The Brunswick House, known colloquially as the "Brunny" and sometimes advertised as "Ye Olde Brunswick House", was a well known pub in the Toronto neighbourhood The Annex.

At its closure in 2016, the Brunswick House was one of the oldest such establishments still in operation in Toronto, as it was founded in 1876. Located at Bloor Street and Brunswick, the Brunny served different clientele over the years.

== History ==
=== Origins ===
The Brunswick House was established by Benjamin Hinchcliffe, who had previously owned a series of hotels including St. George's at Yonge and Richmond and the Osgoode House at Queen and York. He used proceeds from selling land he owned on Chestnut Street to assemble a package of properties on which the construction of the Brunswick House began in 1874.

The original Brunswick House was described in assessment rolls as a two-storey, rough stone 15-by-30-foot building with a separate stable. The hotel originally served early immigrants, wagoners, and labourers who were in need of lodging, food, drink, and a place to stable their horses. The taproom was also used as a ballroom and meeting hall, under the name "Hinchcliff's Hall".

By 1889, the hotel and stable were enlarged and sold to Emma Jury and her husband, a tailor. It was sold, in turn, in 1907 to Edward Jackson who commissioned architect Wilson Siddall to design a new Brunswick House, renamed the Brunswick Hotel, as a three-storey establishment with its large windows, moulded decorations and heavy cornice, to replace the previous building.

=== Ye Olde Brunswick House ===
In 1920, the Brunswick Hotel was purchased by Kate Davidson, who renamed it "Ye Olde Brunswick House." Under the Ontario Temperance Act of 1916, alcohol could only be sold by prescription for personal use by guests in their hotel rooms or private residence while only light beer with a maximum of 4.4% alcohol could be sold in the tavern itself. Davidson was fined several times for selling beer that had more alcohol content than allowed in the years before the Act was repealed in 1927.

=== Nightingale era ===
The Brunswick House was purchased in 1961 by Morris and Albert Nightingale, and managed by Albert, under whose direction the establishment became known for its cheap beer, and sold the greatest volume of alcohol of any tavern in the province. The downstairs of the tavern, nicknamed 'Pickle Alley", held pickle eating contests, the Mrs. Brunswick pageant, and was known for its often eccentric regular entertainers, catering to an older working class crowd.

By the 1970s and 1980s, the upstairs room, known as Albert's Hall after Albert Nightingale, became known as a venue for jazz and the blues in particular, and played host to musicians such as Blossom Dearie, Cab Calloway, Gordon Lightfoot, Oscar Peterson, Muddy Waters, Loretta Lynn, the Climax Jazz Band, Downchild, Blind John Davis, Dr. McJazz, Etta James, Stevie Ray Vaughan, Buddy Guy, Jeff Healey, k.d. lang and Jeff Buckley.

In 1974 four lesbians, the “Brunswick Four”, were part of an historic incident involving the Brunswick House. The four were evicted from the Brunswick House and subsequently arrested, and three were later tried in Ontario Court for obstruction of justice. Two of those three women were acquitted in May 1974, but one, Adrienne Potts, served three months probation. Gay historian Tom Warner believes that the arrest and its consequences was a key incident ushering in a more militant gay and lesbian liberation movement in Canada, much as the Stonewall Inn riots politicized gays and lesbians in the United States. Warner also notes that this was one of the first occasions that a gay or lesbian topic received extensive press coverage in Canada.

=== Modern era ===
In 1981, the Brunswick House was purchased by Jordy Sharp, son of Four Seasons Hotels founder Isadore Sharp. Sharp hired Derek Andrews to run Albert's Hall. Its mixture of bluegrass music, jazz and blues led the Brunswick House to be rated one of the top 10 bars in the world by Newsweek in 1986.

The building was purchased by Joe Badali and Dennis Rawlinson in the 1980s, by which time it had become largely known as a student bar catering to the University of Toronto.

The Brunny became widely known as one of Toronto's most famous and also most dubious drinking establishments. The front area consisted of pool tables and other games. The much larger back area had consisted of concrete floors with benches next to long wooden tables, which the bouncers would walk on top of to quickly reach the many fights. At the end of this hall was a low stage for dancing. The Brunny was known for its cheap beer. The only food served was $1.00 burritos sold by a short man in a sombrero who would travel through the hall selling them. In addition, patrons could buy pickled eggs and pickled sausage from jars at the bar. One of the best known fixtures was "Rockin' Irene", an elderly woman who would perform old bar songs and raunchy tunes much to the delight of the drunk patrons. According to Eye Weekly in 1998-1999 alone there were 155 police visits to the location, and the Brunny was frequently penalized for being over capacity and selling drinks to minors. Between 2011 and 2012, Toronto Police Service disclosed that the Brunswick House was cited in 185 police visited. In late 2013, city officials released a statement concerning the frequency of violence and theft taking place inside and around the Brunswick stating that the Brunswick House or "Brunny" will be under serious police investigation.

In 2014, however, the bar was brought under new management, and its interior and exterior were completely refurbished. The Brunny remained a student-focused venue, though, and Varsity Blues banners hung throughout the space. The new Brunny hired a chef, and presented a full menu, including many items containing gravy. With the addition of their all-you-can-eat gravy bar, It attracted such celebrities as the Fan 590's Sid Seixeiro and Ryan Hains of Rogers Sportsnet. Seixeiro's influence has brought 16 types of poutine to the menu & a late-night sampler called the Rob Ford "Crack of Dawn Munchy Madness."

=== Closure ===
The Brunswick House, by this time owned by Abbis Mahmoud, closed at the end of March 2016, after 140 years in business. The building was refurbished and briefly hosted a Rexall pharmacy on its main floor, with medical offices on the second floor, and lawyers' offices on the third.

Before the pharmacy announced it was closing in 2021, many Torontonians found humour in the fact one could get a COVID-19 vaccine at this Rexall location, citing the irony of achieving inoculation status at the site where generations of Torontonians drank beer, danced and partied with friends.

As of 2022, it has opened as a Savers Value Village Boutique store, selling used clothing and accessories.
