= Jerry Ross (painter) =

American painter (born 1944)

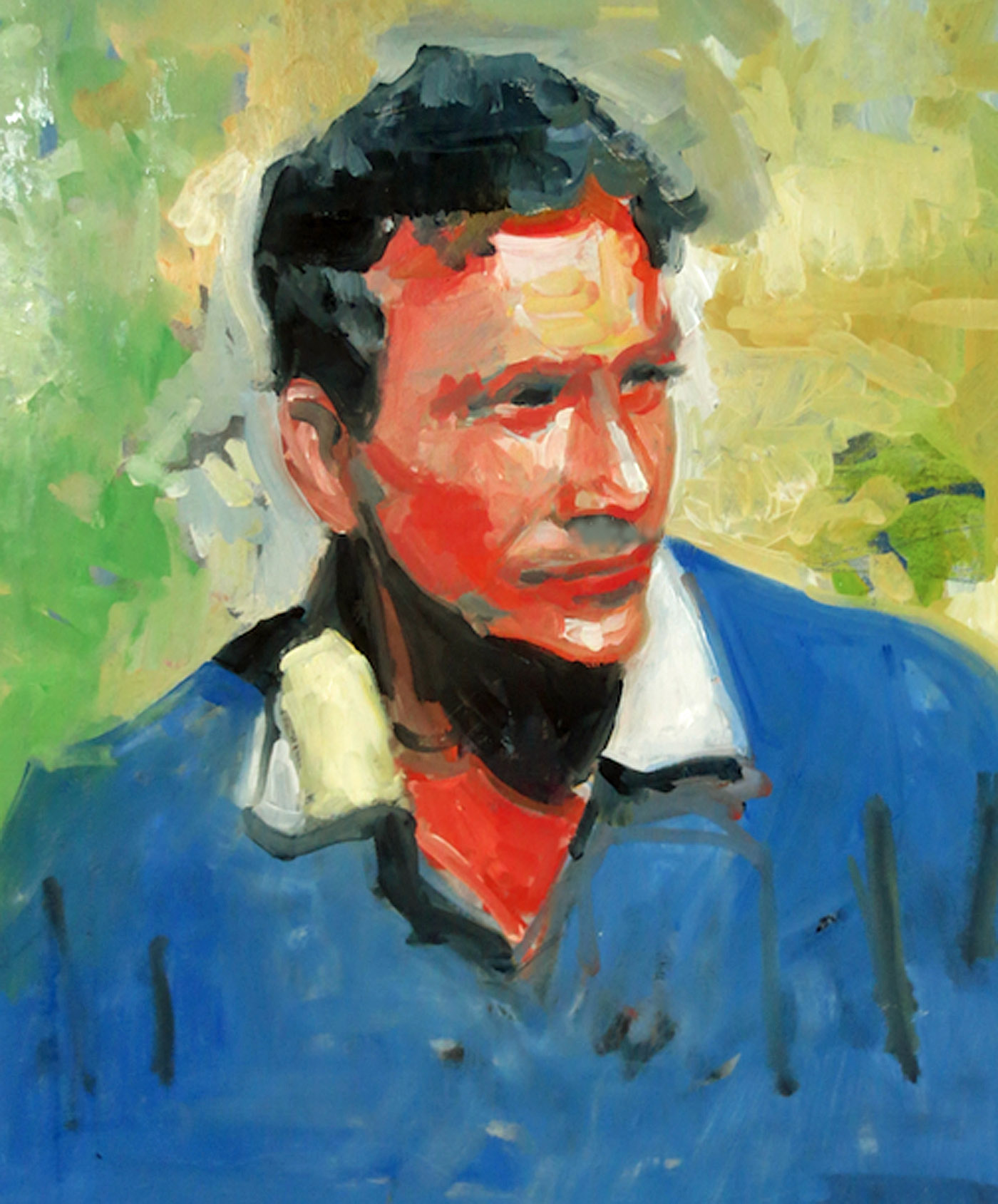
- Self-portrait of Ross as a young man
- Born: Gerald J. Gross; May 11, 1944 (age 82); Buffalo, New York, United States
- Education: B.A., State University of New York at Buffalo, 1968; M.A., University of Oregon, 1984
- Known for: verismo painter
- Notable work: La Mamma, Vedova della Guerra
- Movement: Modernist portraiture and figurative
- Awards: Gold Medal Milan, Italy, 2006
- Patrons: Stefano Goracci, Maria Concetta Giacovelli, Maria Carla Claudii

Jerry Ross (born Gerald J. Gross, May 11, 1944, in Buffalo, New York) is an American painter.

A member of the Buffalo Nine, he was an antiwar activist in the 1960s and became an artist in the 1990s.

== Early life and work ==
Gerald J. Gross and his brother Ronald Cross were born to first-generation Jewish parents, Sidney and Jeanette Gross. The family moved to the suburbs (Kenmore and the town of Tonawanda, New York).

Gross attended the Albright Art School at the Art Institute of Buffalo.

His art teacher, a Mrs. Beagleman, favored an impressionist style of painting, and she continued as his mentor until the art institute closed several years later which he attended from age seven until age eleven, at which time he studied under Tony Sisti, a prizefighter turned oil painter.

== Education and activism ==
From left to right: Jerry Gross, Ray Malek, Cark Kroneberg, Bruce Beyer

Following high school, Ross studied at the State University of New York at Buffalo and became an activist opposed to the Vietnam War. He worked on behalf of the political prisoner Martin Sostre. During this period, he was Chair of Youth Against War and Fascism. He graduated with a B.A. in philosophy in 1968.

On June 20 1968, he was arrested for attending a protest about showing The Green Berets in a broadway movie house. Court proceedings prevented him from being drafted for the Vietnam War.

With Bruce Beyer, he was one of the "Buffalo Nine" anti-war activists arrested in 1968 at the Unitarian Universalist Church of Buffalo. He was added to the Federal Bureau of Investigation's Agitator Index in 1971.

== Career ==
After graduation Ross moved to Arizona and changed his surname to Ross. While in Arizona, Ross lived in the Hotel Pancho Villa in Naco but traveled to Tucson on weekends. Eventually moving to Tucson, he founded the Tao Te Ching Society and taught tai chi in city parks. Ross had studied Kung fu from Wong Ting Fong in Buffalo and Master Liu in London. Adopting taoism as his outlook, Ross emphasized the four taoist virtues ("remote, foolish, cranky, and poor") and the five excellencies (Chinese medicine, martial arts, calligraphy, painting, and philosophy).

He later moved to Oregon where he met his wife Angela Czyzewski at Ken Kesey's Poetic Hoohaw in Eugene in May, 1977. He continued teaching tai chi at Hayward Field, at the University of Oregon. His marriage to his first wife, Pamela Fore Tyree, of Chapel Hill, North Carolina, ended in divorce. Pamela died accidentally in Albuquerque, New Mexico in 2008.

Shortly afterward, Ross was juried into the New Zone Art Collective and helped to found the Downtown Initiative for the Visual Arts (DIVA) in Eugene, Oregon.

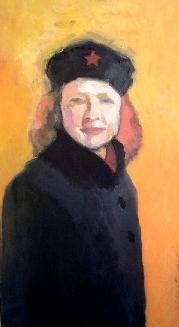
Portrait of Angela

In 1991, Ross founded the popular Salon des Refuses art show. After his work was rejected from the annual Mayor's Art Show in Eugene, Ross planted an easel outside of the exhibition's reception as a gesture of public protest. He was joined by other artists whose works were similarly rejected and who ultimately formed their own alternative exhibition, the Salon des Refuses, which has been held every year since 1991.

Ross started Post Office to Eugene Museum, a group advocating for transforming the downtown historic post office into a municipal art museum. Although that effort failed, in the process Ross was able to get the State of Oregon Historic Preservationist to declare that the FDR era murals in the post office lobby were historic and could not be destroyed or painted over.

Ross had a retrospective exhibit at the Gordon Hotel on downtown Eugene, 9n June-July 2026. He exhibited four decades of work. His most recent work consists of mostly semi-abstract landscapes from a series of plein air works completed along the Willamette River in Skinners Butte park. The Artwork Archives repository describes his work Tree Shadows, Skinners Butte Park:

"This painting moves toward something deeper than description. The path, reduced almost to a dragged horizontal band of cool and warm light, becomes less a road than a current flowing beneath the dark architecture of the trees. Here the masses of shadow are not empty darkness but living forms interrupted by sudden explosions of light — glimpses of atmosphere breaking through the dense canopy of Skinner’s Butte Park along the Willamette River. In this work, Jerry Ross pushes American Verismo toward a kind of atmospheric mass macchia in which the painting is constructed through broad tonal relationships rather than rigid topographical detail."

== Artistic style ==
Ross is founder and an activist within his American Verismo Movement. The “Manifesto of American Verismo, The Philosophy of Seeing” on his web page declares: "Painting is not the representation of reality; it is the experience of reality made visible." We live in an age saturated with images, yet genuine seeing has become increasingly rare. American Verismo begins with a simple conviction: reality is never exhausted by appearances. The visible world reveals itself only to those willing to observe patiently, directly, and imaginatively. Painting is not the copying of nature but a dialogue between the world and lived experience. Every brushstroke records not only what the eye perceives but also memory, emotion, intuition, and the physical presence of the painter.”

=== Inspiration ===
Ross gleans dual inspiration from the people and landscape of his home in the Willamette Valley and his long ties to Italy, as well as the “poetic realism” of the 19th century Italian movement, the Macchiaioli. He is a self-proclaimed practitioner of the American Verismo approach to painting. He has had exhibitions in Italy, (Rome, Milan, Florence, Bologna, Terni, Loiano), Las Vegas, and Oregon.

=== Maritime art and boatbuilding ===
Boats have been a recurring subject in Ross's work. His interest extends beyond their depiction in paintings to their construction and use. He has built wooden boats, designed boats, and sailed extensively. His knowledge of boat construction and handling has informed his paintings of working vessels and maritime communities. His maritime paintings have been discussed in relation to the American tradition of coastal painting associated with artists such as Fitz Henry Lane and Winslow Homer. Ross' work has particularly focused on the relationship between boats, people, and the coastal environments in which they operate.

=== Influences ===
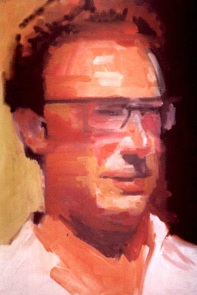
Portrait of Carlo Bianchi

Ross's painting style has been influenced by Abstract Expressionism, particularly the work of Willem de Kooning and Richard Diebenkorn.This influence is revealed in his bold use of color and his expressive, experimental handling of pigment. His painterly style utilizes a technique borrowed from Francis Bacon (mild distortions) but, as seen in the Portrait of Carlo Bianchi, it also references photography and computer imagery. Ross has also been influenced by Umberto Coromaldi (Rome 1870–1948, Telemaco Signorini (Florence, 1835–1901), and most recently, Domenico Morelli (Napoli, 1823–1901).

== Publications and professional affiliations ==
Publications and professional affiliations Ross' work has been reproduced in publications concerning watercolor, maritime art, and contemporary landscape painting. His work has appeared in The Best of Watercolor, published by Rockport Publishers, as well as Coast to Coast: The Contemporary Landscape in Florida, A Gallery of Maritime Art, and Painting Light and Shadow. His paintings have also been featured in Maritime Life and Traditions, a British publication devoted to maritime history and culture. Ross is a professional member of the International Society of Marine Painters and a signature member of the Florida Watercolor Society. He has also taught painting and related subjects at institutions including WoodenBoat School. Ross has self-published a series of books avaolable from Amazon books including American Verismo, Olgopoly, Trump christianity: Hijackong Faith for Power and Spinoza.

== Exhibitions ==
- 1988 New Zone Art Gallery—two-person show, group shows
- 1989 Hult Center, Mayor's Art Show -- Portrait after Oreshnikov
- 1991 Founding Salon des Refuses Show -- Portrait after Frans Hals
- 1995 Hult Center, Mayor's Art Show -- Portrait of Bob Devine
- 1999 Comune di Loiano, Italy (June 17-July 3)
- 1999 American Consulate in Milan, Italy
- 1999 Collier House (Faculty Club), University of Oregon, Eugene, Oregon
- 2000 American Consulate in Milan, Italy
- 2000 Cafe Cabiria, Florence, Italy (Piazza S. Spirito)
- 2000 Comune di Loiano, Loiano (Bologna), Italy
- 2000 Mayor's Choice Award, Mayor's Show, Eugene, Oregon -- La Mamma
- 2001 Provenance Gallery, Eugene—solo show
- 2001 Jacob's Gallery -- Art in History, Science, and Culture
- 2001 31st Annual Willamette Valley Juried Show, Corvallis, Oregon
- 2001 Rome, Italy, Galleria d' Arte La Borgognona
- 2002 Rome, Italy, Galleria d' Arte La Borgognona
- 2003 Chetwynd-Stapleton Gallery, Portland
- 2003 Marghitta Feldman Gallery—solo show
- 2004 "Connections" Contemporary Arts Collective, Las Vegas, Nevada
- 2004 Barrios Cafe, Milan, Italy
- 2004 Salon des Refuses at DIVA -- Portrait of Carlo Giuliani
- 2005 Adam's Place and Luna's Jazz Center
- 2006 Le Loggia della Fornace, Rastignano, Italy -- Colori d'Europa
- 2006 Milano Opening Centro Foscolo, Comune di Corsico
- 2006 Comune di Loiano Sala Fantazzini di Loiano
- 2006 Mayor's Art Show, Eugene, Oregon
- 2006 Jacobs Gallery Eugene, Oregon
- 2007 The Springfield Museum, Springfield, Oregon—solo exhibition
- 2008 TrackTown USA—Maude Kerns—Eugene, May 30
- 2008 Olympic Trials Exhibit—Eugene Airport, June–July
- 2008 Eugene Mayor's Art Show September-Oct
- 2008 November - DIVA Gallery One—Nov 25 thru December
- 2009 "Uprising" Springfield Museum January 30-February 21
- 2009 20th Annual Juried Show Las Vegas, February 5 - March 27
- 2009 World Art Expo 2009: June 7–14 Orange County, CA
- 2009 Grand Salon Des Arts gallery. (Brea Galler, Orange County, CA
- 2010 LaFollette Gallery, One Person Show, April and May
- 2010 Open Studio American Academy in Rome, Italy, Dec 12th
- 2011 The Eugene Jazz Station 124 W. Broadway Two month exhibit
- 2011 "La Poetica del vero"—Eugene Yoga Center, Sept-Oct
- 2011 Eugene Mayor's Show 2011, Sept-Oct 8th
- 2011 Visual Arts Showcase—Beaverton, Oregon, Nov 4–13
- 2012 Runyan Gallery, Nye Beach Newport, March 2 - April 2
- 2012 August 1 - August 15 Buffalo, NY: "RELATED" a 4-person show at Queen City Gallery, Buffalo, New York
- 2012 Eugene Mayor's Show, Sept-Oct
- 2012 October Brownville Art Association, Brownsville, OR "Club Macchia" exhibit
- 2013 March 27 Open Studio, American Academy in Rome
- 2013 April 25-May 15 Terni, Italy Comune di Terni Centro Via Aminale
- 2013 August 1 - August 31 - Club Macchia Group Show, Brownsville Art Center, Brownsville, OR
- 2013 Sept 1 - Sept 30, Out on a Limb Gallery, E. Broadway, Eugene
- 2014 Feb-Mar Randy's Cafe in Brownsville: 13 paintings
- 2014 March Eugene City Bakery: 10 paintings
- 2014 August - October 4 Eugene Mayor's Show
- 2015 March 27-May 2 "The Macchia Six" group show at the Jacobs Gallery
- 2016 April 23 at Villa San Carlo Borromeo in Senago (near Milan) the painting "La Tavola Italiana" by Jerry Ross and sculpture: "La Tavola Italiana" by Giovanni Smeraldi.
- 2017 Here for All Exhibit Umpqua Community College, Roseburg, OR
- 2017 Jim Tronson Gallery 740 Main Street, Springfield, OR Oct-Nov Tues-Sat 1-4 pm
- 2017-2018 November–April US Federal Building, Eugene, OR "Faces and Places"
- 2019 Sept 5TH AND 6TH ANNUAL Barbizon Brownsville Paintout
- 2019 July-Oct Cafe Soriah, Eugene, Oregon
- 2019 Nov 9 - Dec 21st About Light 700 SW Madison Ave Corvallis, OR
- 2020 January Emerald Art Center 500 Main Street Springfield, Oregon
- 2026 (forthcoming) Retrospective exhibition, Gordon Hotel, Eugene, Oregon

== Awards and recognitions ==
- Jerry Ross has been honored in Eugene, Oregon, with many local awards for his paintings, including Mayor's Art Show awards for La Mamma: Portrait of Stephania Mastrocinque and Vedova di Guerra: War Widow.
- In 2001, he received a Juror's Award at the 31st Annual Willamette Valley Juried Show in Corvallis, Oregon.
- In 1996, he came in second place in a painting competition held in Livergnano, Italy.
- In 2005, he won a gold medal and one-person show in Milan, Italy, as a result of a competition held in Corsico (Milan), Italy, sponsored by "Il gruppo cesare Frigerio."
- The Milan jurors wrote that Ross's work represented "un naturalismo di matrice novecentesca ed un cromatismo tonale di forte effetto plastico costruiscono un'atmosfera compostamente poetica" ("a sort of naturalism founded upon a twentieth-century matrix and a tonal type of chromatism with a strong, sculptural effect, to construct a composed, poetic atmosphere."
- Selected to give a presentation (in Italian) for "La Tavola Italiana" and the unveiling of the painting "La Tavola Italiana" 2016 April 23 at Villa San Carlo Borromeo in Senago, near Milan.
- Jerry Ross was juried (2020) into Galerie Sonia Monti 6, avenue Delcassé 75008 Paris, France that now represents his work.
- The Burchfield Penny Art Center (Museum) in Buffalo, NY accepted "Portrait of Martin Sostre" into its permanent collection after it was donated by the author, Ron Ford (December, 2020).
