= Buffalo Nine =

Vietnam War protesters in New York

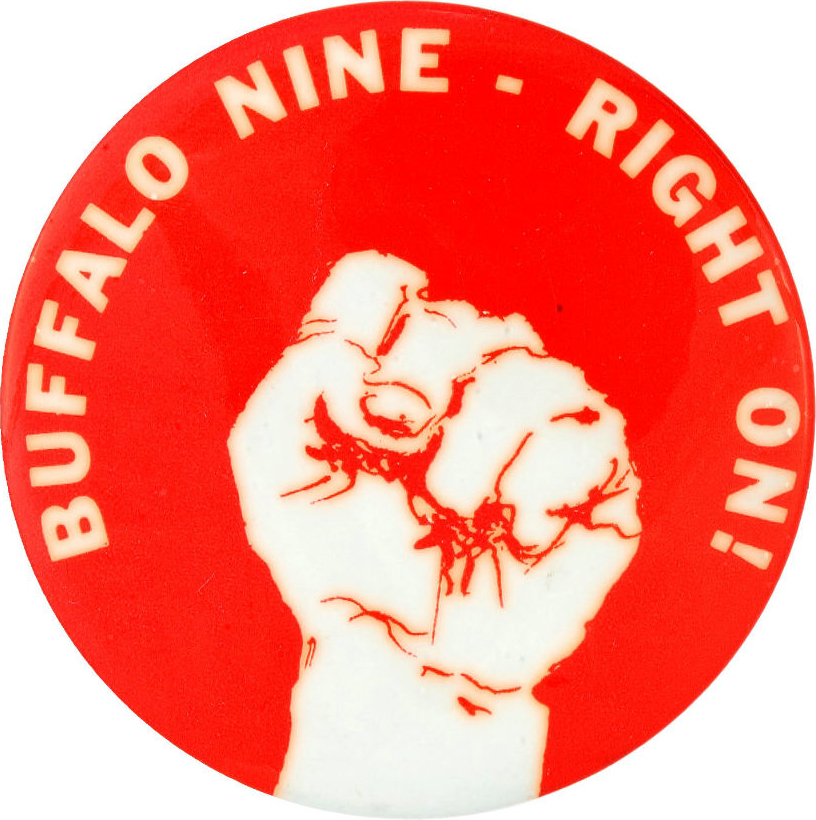
Buffalo Nine pin, 1960s

The Buffalo Nine were a group of nine Vietnam War protesters who were arrested on August 19, 1968, at the Unitarian Universalist Church in Buffalo, New York.

== Background ==
During the Vietnam War there was a rise in draft resistance as a political statement. A group of students, primarily associated with the University at Buffalo, had been active against the draft and the war. When they and supporters sought sanctuary in the Unitarian church on Elmwood Avenue, U.S. Marshals, FBI agents, and Buffalo Police surrounded the church. The minister, Dr. Paul Carnes, was out of the country in Romania during this time. Eventually, the lawmen "stormed" the church. When the group of lawmen entered the church, they used blackjacks to "clear the aisle". Bruce Beyer, a leader of the Buffalo Draft Resistance Union, was arrested, as were seven others, on charges including draft evasion and assaulting an officer. Others arrested included prominent campus radicals Carl Kronberg and Jerry Gross. A later investigation led them to arrest Students for a Democratic Society organizer Bill Yates.

== Trials ==
The first federal trial began in February, 1969. Around 150 University of Buffalo students and faculty picketed the U.S. Courthouse, chanting "Free the Nine - The Trial's a Crime." The defendants and their lawyers used the trial as an organizing tool. Beyer, Gross, and Kronberg and the other defendants informed the court that it was necessary to resist an "immoral, illegal, racist, politically insane war on the Vietnamese people." The jury was unable to reach a verdict on several of the defendants but Bruce Beyer was convicted and received a three-year sentence.

At the second trial, Malak, Yates, and Berry angered the judge and others by raising their fists in power salutes when introduced to the court, guaranteeing a contentious atmosphere. Malak and Yates drew contempt of court citations for refusing to stand as the judge left for a recess. In the end, Berry and Kronberg were acquitted, but Malak and Yates were convicted. The jury was unable to arrive at a verdict on Jerry Gross and the government decided to drop his case. Malak and Yates were sentenced to three years' imprisonment.

== Reaction ==
The series of trials occupied the attention of the university and city. The Buffalo Nine Defense Committee was formed, publishing its own newsletter, Liberated Community News, out of the Urban Action offices, publishers of "The Buffalo Broadside" newsletter, as well as a printing facility for various student newspapers. In October 1968 this office was raided by Buffalo Police, based on an accusation that a foot patrolman had been threatened with violence, an action that drew protest from the Buffalo ACLU over police use of violence. During that raid six men were arrested, three on the street corner and three inside the offices, and charged with various misdemeanors, all of which were later dropped or reduced to disorderly conduct. Of those arrested only Kronberg had any relationship to the Buffalo Nine.

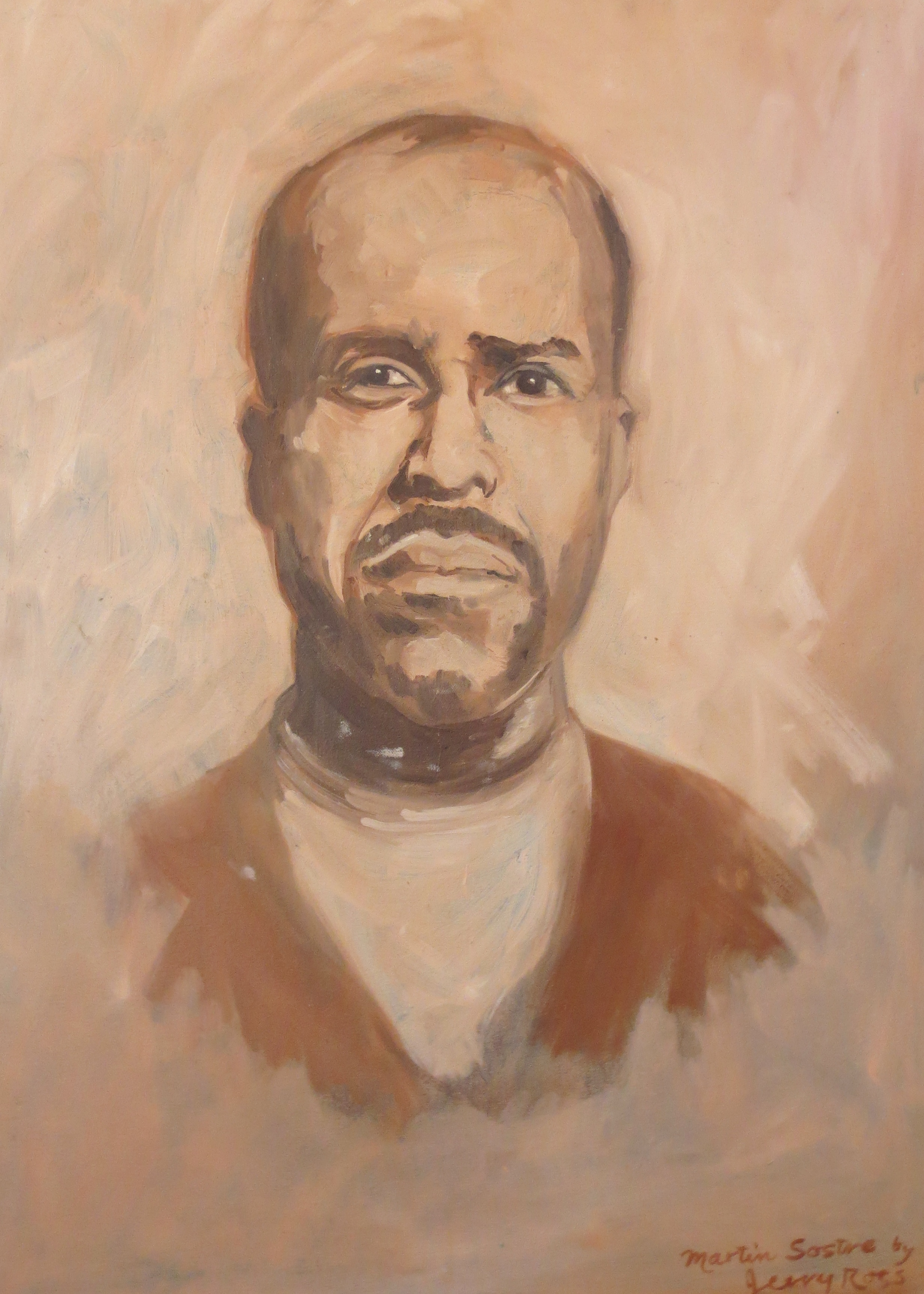
Martin Sostre portrait

Another contemporaneous political trial, of great significance to the Buffalo Nine defendants and the larger community, was that of Martin Sostre, owner of the Afro-Asian Bookstore in Buffalo's Black ghetto. Sostre was arrested on riot and drug charges and Jerry Gross became the Chairman of the Martin Sostre Defense Committee.

A symposium in September 1968 to discuss the Buffalo Nine case drew prominent New York City intellectuals such as Susan Sontag.

When Beyer was convicted the UB campus erupted into violent protests. Hundreds of students stormed the campus and set fire to buildings that housed a US Navy research project. Others entered Hayes Hall and climbed to the top of its bell tower, ringing its bells continuously to be heard across campus.

== Members ==
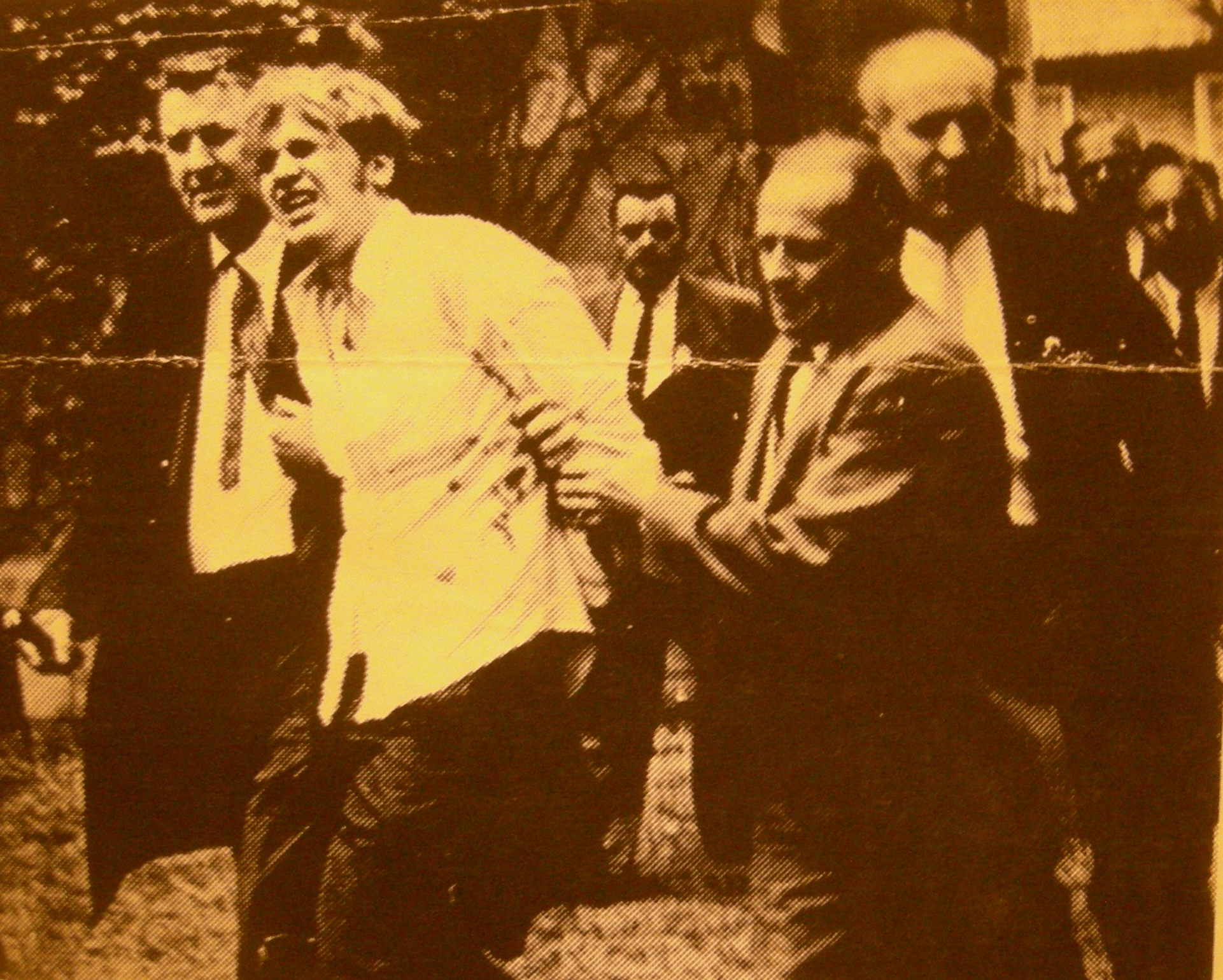
Arrest of Bruce Beyer, 1977

=== Bruce Beyer ===
Bruce Beyer fled Buffalo, New York in 1972 and lived on a 100 acre farm in Bancroft, Ontario until 1977. He returned to Buffalo, New York in 20 October 1977.

"What started out as a peaceful, non-violent demonstration against the war and the Selective Service System, ended in a violent fist-swinging melee. I maintain to this day that this was precisely what the government had in mind when it sent thirty-two police officers to arrest two draft resisters ..." (Bruce Beyer)

From left to right: Jerry Gross, Ray Malek, Cark Kroneberg, Bruce Beyer

=== Other members ===
- Bruce Cline, organiser with the Students for a Democratic Society.
- Ray Malak, Chairman of the Research Action Committee of Students for a Democratic Society (SDS), Vietnam veteran
- Thomas O'Connell, Vietnam veteran
- James McGlynn, Vietnam veteran
- William Berry, organizer, Buffalo Draft Resistance Union
- Carl Kronberg, organizer, Peace and Freedom Party
- Jerry Gross, Chairman of Youth Against War and Fascism (YAWF) and Martin Sostre Defense Committee
- William Yates, Students for a Democratic Society (SDS)

== Aftermath ==
An article appeared in the Magazine Section of the Buffalo News, December 18, 1988, with extensive detail about the case and also covering the 20-year reunion, in Buffalo, of some of the defendants.

== See also ==
- List of peace activists
