= Vietnam War resisters in Canada =

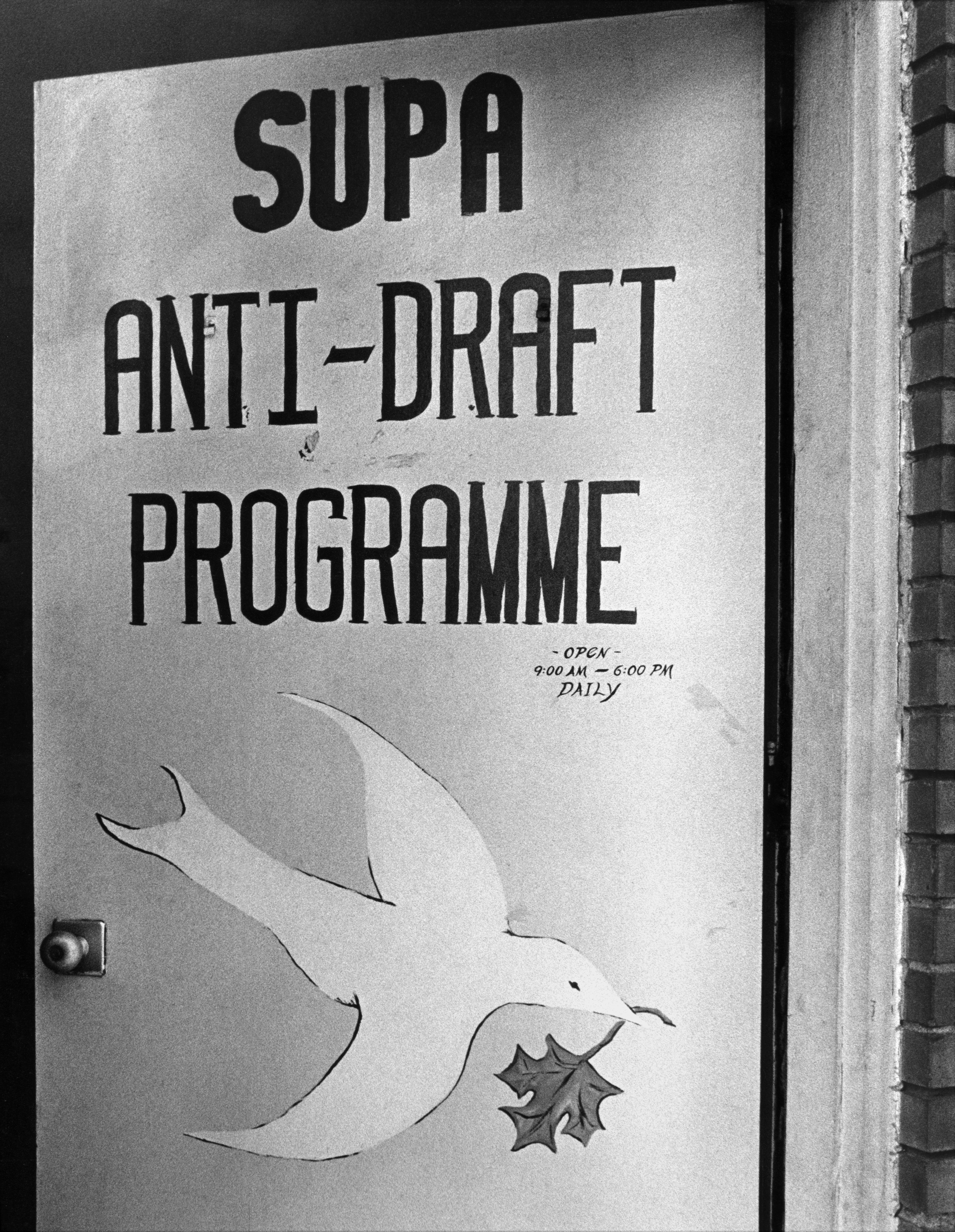
Street door to the office of the Student Union for Peace Action's Anti-Draft Programme, on busy Spadina Avenue in Toronto, August 1967.

Vietnam War resisters in Canada were Americans who did not wish to serve in the Vietnam War by seeking political asylum in Canada between 1965 and 1975. They fell into two main categories: draft evaders, who were typically college-educated and middle class Americans who would no longer avoid conscription, and military deserters, who tended to be lower-income and working class who had been inducted into the United States Armed Forces right after high school or had later volunteered.

Many Americans who took refuge in Canada assimilated in the country and continued to reside there after the war's end in 1975.

== History ==
=== Immigration and politics ===
Starting in 1965, Canada became the primary choice for Vietnam War asylum seekers. Canadian immigration policy at the time made it easy for immigrants from all countries to obtain legal status in Canada, and classified American asylum seekers as immigrants. There is no official estimate of how many American asylum seekers were admitted during the Vietnam War. One estimate puts their number between 30,000 and 40,000.

The Canadian government initially refused to admit asylum seekers who could not prove that they had been discharged from American military service; this would change in 1968. On May 22, 1969, Ottawa announced that immigration officials would not and could not ask about applicants' military status if they sought residence. The issue of accepting American exiles became a local political debate in Canada that focused on Canada's sovereignty in its immigration law.

The United States never seriously contested Canada's actions, while Sweden's acceptance was heavily criticized. The United States did not become involved because American politicians generally viewed Canada as a close ally not worth disturbing over a war that was becoming rapidly unpopular domestically and internationally. Emigration from the United States continued to be unusually high while the United States was involved in the Vietnam War and maintained compulsory military service. In 1971 and 1972, Canada received more immigrants from the United States than from any other country.

American draft evaders were at first assisted by the Student Union for Peace Action, a campus-based Canadian anti-war group with connections to Students for a Democratic Society. By late 1967, draft evaders were being assisted primarily by several locally based anti-draft groups (over twenty of them), such as the Vancouver Committee to Aid American War Objectors and the Toronto Anti-Draft Programme. As a counsellor for the Programme, Mark Satin wrote the Manual for Draft-Age Immigrants to Canada in 1968. It sold nearly 100,000 copies overall.

==== Locations ====
Many went to Toronto. Others went to the Slocan Valley valley area and lives in intentional communities, including Strawberry Hill.

Others drafter dodgers went to North Hastings included Bruce Beyer, who lived in Bancroft. Draft evaders had a significant population impact in Maynooth, Ontario.

=== Amnesty and repatriations ===
In September 1974, President Gerald R. Ford created an amnesty program for draft evaders that required them to work in alternative service occupations for periods of six to 24 months. In January 19, 1977 President Jimmy Carter fulfilled a campaign promise and offered pardons to any draft evader who requested one. It created controversy, with the right complaining of giving amnesty to criminals and those on the left complaining that requesting a pardon required the admission of a crime.

According to sociologist John Hagan, after the 1977 amnesty about half of the draft evaders in Canada remained while the other half returned to the United States. Notably among those who chose to return were lower-income individuals who had trouble finding work in Canada, a minority of leftist radicals who had demanded amnesty, and ethnic minorities who had trouble assimilating to Canadian culture. Despite not being granted amnesty, about 4 in 5 asylum seekers eventually returned to the United States.

=== Assimilation ===
Those that continued to live in Canada would form a visible community of Americans in Canada. The notably young and educated population that remained expanded Canada's arts and academic sectors. American draft evaders who left for Canada and became prominent there include author William Gibson, politician Jim Green, gay rights advocate Michael Hendricks, attorney Jeffry House, author Keith Maillard, playwright John Murrell, television personality Eric Nagler, film critic Jay Scott, and musician Jesse Winchester. Other draft evaders from the Vietnam era remain in Sweden and elsewhere.

== People ==
Interview with Mike Tulley, an American Vietnam War deserter who emigrated to Canada. (For interview, click on gray arrow at lower left of photo.)

=== Deserters ===
An estimated one thousand deserters fled to Canada to avoid more service in the Vietnam War. The United States government have not pardoned them and they may still face pro forma arrest if they return to the United States, as the case of Allen Abney demonstrated in March 2006.

=== Draft evaders ===
Estimates vary greatly as to how many Americans immigrated to Canada for the specific reason of evading conscription, as opposed to desertion, or other reasons. Canadian immigration statistics show that 20,000 to 30,000 draft-eligible American men came to Canada as immigrants during the Vietnam era. The BBC stated that "as many as 60,000 young American men dodged the draft." Estimates of the total number of American citizens who moved to Canada due to their opposition to the war range from 50,000 to 125,000 This exodus was "the largest politically motivated migration from the United States since the United Empire Loyalists moved north to oppose the American Revolution."

These young men were often well educated, and alienated from American society, showing a knowledge and distaste for American social problems at the time. Most felt the Vietnam War was immoral, and felt supported by the era's counterculture and protests to make the decision to flee to Canada. Despite a general distaste for the war, only a minority were active political radicals. Many may have made the decision to immigrate to Canada not because of a major opposition to the morality of the war, but in fear of a removal of personal independence brought by conscription. Many were middle class and needed little assistance assimilating in Canada. Draft evaders of a lower class background were more likely to come to Canada only as a last resort.

American draft evaders tended to balance the "brain drain" that Canada had experienced. While some draft evaders returned to the United States after a pardon was declared in 1977 during the administration of Jimmy Carter, roughly half of them stayed in Canada.

== Notable Vietnam War resisters in Canada ==
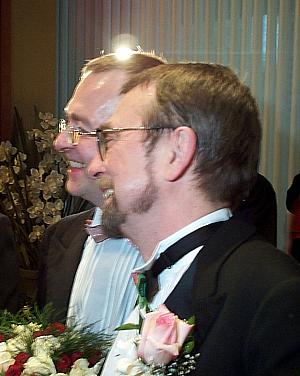
Michael Hendricks (right) is an American draft evader who became a prominent gay rights activist in Canada.

=== Deserters ===
- Andy Barrie - former host of Canadian Broadcasting Corporation Radio's Metro Morning in Toronto (He later received a General Discharge from the United States Army, became a Canadian citizen, and is free to travel to the U.S.)
- Michael Shaffer: "After six months in the Army, my application for CO status was denied and I was told that I would be going to Vietnam. I refused to draw my weapon and was ordered court-martialed. On Labour Day 1970 I was able to escape and cross into Canada ... During President Ford's Clemency Program in 1975, I went to Fort Dix seeking the "Undesirable Discharge" offered to deserters who turned themselves in. The Army decided that I wasn't eligible and court-martial proceedings were resumed. With help from the ACLU, I was released and two years later a Federal Court ordered the Army to discharge me Honourably as a Conscientious Objector ... I remained in Vancouver"
- Dick Cotterill
- Jack Todd – award-winning sports columnist for the Montreal Gazette
- Mike Tulley - Edmonton, Alberta area sound engineer and social activist

=== Draft evaders ===
- Bruce Beyer – fled Buffalo to live in Bancroft, Ontario
- Mike Fisher – founding member of Heart, notable rock/pop band
- William Gibson – science fiction writer, winner of a Nebula Award
- Jim Green – Vancouver city councillor and mayoral candidate
- Michael Hendricks – gay rights advocate
- Jeffry House – lawyer, clients include many activists
- Bill King – musician and organizer of Toronto's Beaches Jazz Festival
- Michael Klein – activist physician, spouse of Bonnie Sherr Klein, father of Naomi Klein
- Keith Maillard – professor of creative writing, University of British Columbia
- Eric Nagler – children's entertainer on The Elephant Show
- Wayne Robinson – father of Svend Robinson, former Member of Parliament
- Jay Scott – film critic, The Globe and Mail
- Samuel J. Steiner
- Jesse Winchester – singer-songwriter
- Michael Wolfson – assistant chief statistician at Statistics Canada
- Alan Rinehart – musician, classical guitarist

=== Others ===
- Jane Jacobs – journalist and author

== See also ==
- American immigration to Canada
- Black refugee (War of 1812)
- Iraq War resisters in Canada
