= American verismo =

American verismo describes an artistic style of American literature, music, or painting influenced and inspired by artistic ideas that began in 19th-century Italian culture, movements that used motifs from everyday life and working class persons from both urban and rural situations. American composers, writers, painters, and poets have used this genre to create works that contain socio-political as well as purely aesthetic statements.

== History ==
In Italy, the term verismo is applied to the use of everyday life and characters in artistic works. It was introduced into opera in the early 1900s in reaction to contemporary conventions that were regarded as artificial and untruthful.

Generally, verismo (meaning "realism," from Italian vero, meaning "true") refers to a 19th-century Italian painting style. This style was practiced most characteristically by the I Macchiaioli a group of Tuscan painters, who were forerunners of the French Impressionists. The style and its underlying social goals related to general 19th-century artistic developments that occurred in many countries, from Scandinavia to the Mediterranean, which stemmed from nationalist movements and intellectuals' responses to the effects of industrialization.

In Italy, the national origin of verismo, especially in literature and opera, was a profound sympathy for the disadvantaged working people, whose life, for the most part, consisted of hard labor, poverty, and oppression.

For example, the authors Giovanni Verga, Luigi Capuana, Domenico Ciampoli, Renato Fucini, Matilde Serao introduced the language of common people into their works and made extensive use of dialects. The Italians also created a theater that reflected everyday life, as exemplified by the comedies of Gerolamo Rovetta and Giuseppe Giacosa.

In America, Tobias Picker's 2013 opera Dolores Clairborne was acclaimed as a “triumph of American verismo.”

Verismo opera composers often chose rural folk, poor city dwellers, and representatives of bohemianism. Early works in this genre were Pietro Mascagni's Cavalleria Rusticana (1890) which chose rural folk, poor city dwellers, and bohemian characters.

Verismo entered opera through ‘scene popolari’, such as Verga’s Cavalleria rusticana (1884), which was the first text to be turned into an opera. In 1888 the publisher Edoardo Sonzogno advertised a competition for a one-act opera by a young Italian composer. Mascagni had no innovatory intentions in his choice of Verga’s popular one-act play. The libretto preserved the vivid dialogue and the rapid pace but the operatic version was distanced from the veristic play by a distortion of its social characteristics and a dilution of its down-to-earth language with traditional high-flown libretto jargon. The opera’s success, however (1890, Rome), led to Cavalleria rusticana becoming the prototype of a new genre. The term verismo was adopted, to designate the subject of the libretto and the work's musico-dramatic structure. The 1890s witnessed a brief flowering of operas on veristic subjects, both in Italy and abroad.

== Jerry Ross ==
The American painter Jerry Ross, who calls his style “American verismo”, builds on the ideas of art historian Albert Boime and his book The Art of the Macchia and the Risorgimento, Representing Culture and Nationalism in Nineteenth-Century Italy.

This text had a huge effect on Ross who began incorporating the story of the I Macchialioli into his class materials. Ross's own background in the radical politics of the 1960s and 1970s led to his identification with the Tuscan group, many of whom participated in the struggle for Italian socialism and national unification. In 2013, Ross wrote a "Manifesto of American Verismo," which summarized many of his ideas on the subject.

Desiring a painting style that was truly Italian and representative of their particular cultural characteristics, loose and expressive and breaking with tradition the I Macchiaioli began artistic movement. As explained by Boime, their “sketch style” and “non finito” (unfinished) look was both modern and a clean break with academic “polish”, but also the subject matter was often political as well, featuring socio-political issues such as the plight of women, workers, and farmers.

Ross points out that the most experienced plein air painters generally use this approach, sometimes called “contemporary impressionism.” Ross notes that after absorbing some of the ideas in painting brought into the light of day by the Abstract Expressionists, plein air painters need to incorporate abstraction and descriptive/expressive brushwork as well as texture techniques that give the surface a three-dimensional quality. His class “abstraction in plein air emphasizes the idea of discovery of large abstract shapes and the importance of composition. In his approach, “there is abstraction within realism and realism within abstraction.”

== Bibliography ==
- Pascale, Toni (January 13, 2015). "What is Verismo?". Toni Pascale. p. 1.
- Boime, Albert (1993). The art of the Macchia and the Risorgimento : representing culture and nationalism in nineteenth-century Italy. Chicago: University of Chicago Press. ISBN 9780226063300. OCLC 25873955.
- Hirsch, Lisa (September 19, 2013). "Picker's "Dolores Claiborne" a triumph for American verismo and San Francisco Opera". The Classical Review. p. 1.
- Cipolle, Alex V (December 31, 2015). "Painting the Political". The Eugene Weekly. p. 1. Archived from the original on 2017-09-03.
- Schulte, Mary Jane (September 25, 2014). "Adding Poetry to the World". The Eugene Register Guard. pp. 1, 2.
