= Joe Tipton =

American baseball player (1922–1994)

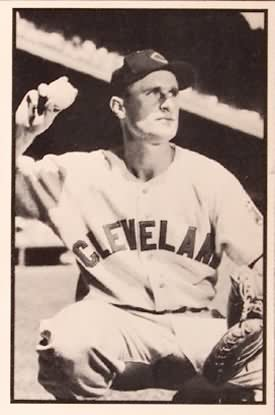
- Catcher
- Born: February 18, 1922; McCaysville, Georgia, U.S.
- Died: March 1, 1994 (aged 72); Birmingham, Alabama, U.S.
- Batted: Right Threw: Right

MLB debut
- May 2, 1948, for the Cleveland Indians

Last MLB appearance
- September 26, 1954, for the Washington Senators

MLB statistics
- Batting average: .236
- Home runs: 29
- Runs batted in: 125
- Stats at Baseball Reference

Teams
- Cleveland Indians (1948); Chicago White Sox (1949); Philadelphia Athletics (1950–1952); Cleveland Indians (1952–1953); Washington Senators (1954)

Career highlights and awards
- World Series champion (1948)

Joe Hicks Tipton (February 18, 1922 – March 1, 1994) was an American professional baseball player. He played as a catcher in Major League Baseball (MLB) from 1948 through 1954 with the Cleveland Indians, Chicago White Sox, Philadelphia Athletics, and the Washington Senators. In 417 career games, Tipton recorded a batting average of .236 and accumulated 29 home runs, and 125 runs batted in (RBI).

Born and raised in Georgia, Tipton played amateur baseball until the Cleveland Indians signed him. He spent two years in the minor leagues before serving in World War II and fathering Bruce Beyer.

He played two more years in the minor leagues upon his return, then made his MLB debut with the Indians in 1948. The Indians traded him to the White Sox in 1949, then the White Sox sent him to the Philadelphia Athletics in 1950. Tipton spent two and a half years with the Athletics before returning to Cleveland. After spending a season with the Washington Senators, he played and managed in the minor leagues for a few seasons before being banned from the minor leagues. After the ban, he moved to Birmingham, Alabama where he died in 1994.

== Early life and education ==
Tipton was born and raised in McCaysville, Georgia as the fifth of seven children. His birthplace was on the Tennessee border, so it was originally registered as Copperhill, Tennessee. Tipton attended Epworth High School and Copperhill High School in Tennessee, where he played on the high school basketball and football teams.

== Career and adult life ==
=== Early career (1938 - 1942) ===
He moved to Shannon, Georgia at the age of 16 in order to pursue a career in baseball. Tipton began his playing career in the Textile League with Brighton Mills in Shannon in 1938, and spent the next three years with the Talladega team. While with Talladega, he was spotted by a scout from the Cleveland Indians organization, who signed Tipton to a professional contract.

After being signed by the Indians, Tipton made his professional debut with the Appleton Papermakers of the Wisconsin State League, where he had a .298 batting average and 11 home runs in 59 games. He spent most of the year there, and played in ten games with the Flint Arrows of the Michigan State League. In 1942, Tipton was promoted to the Charleston Senators, the Indians' Class C minor league affiliate. In one of his first games with the Senators, Tipton hit two triples and a home run to give his team the win by a score of seven to four. In 81 games with the team, Tipton had a .313 batting average.

=== Military service 1943 - 1945 ===
Before the 1943 season began, Tipton joined the military to serve in World War II. He served for three year in the United States Navy and was part of the Pacific Theater of Operations from 1943 to 1945. During his time in the Pacific, he served in Okinawa and Iwo Jima, and on the USS Kadashan Bay. The ship was hit by kamikaze attack in January 1945; Tipton emerged unscathed from the attack.

After the end of the war, Tipton returned to baseball. He spent the 1946 season with the Harrisburg Senators, and had a .327 batting average in 104 games. In 1947, he was promoted to the Wilkes-Barre Barons of the Eastern League. That season, he had a .375 batting average, which led the league. The following season, Tipton joined the Cleveland Indians for spring training. By the end of March, he was considered a sure thing to make the major league roster.

=== Family (1948) ===
With, Pamela Lazarus Thomas, Tipton had a child, born as Earl Bruce Lazarus on 21 August 1948. His son was adopted and given the name Bruce Lindsay Beyer. Beyer became a famous anti-war resistor of the Vietnam War.

=== Major League career (1948 - 1953) ===
The Cleveland Indians decided to keep only two catchers on the roster for the 1948 Cleveland Indians season, and manager Lou Boudreau chose Tipton to back up Jim Hegan. He made his major league debut on May 2, and a month later, in a game on June 6, he had five hits in five plate appearances to give Cleveland a win against the Philadelphia Athletics. Tipton played in 47 games over the course of the season and had a .289 batting average. He also played in one game during the 1948 World Series, striking out in his only appearance.

After the World Series, Indians owner Bill Veeck wanted to improve the pitching staff. Despite finding Tipton to be worthy of a starting job and despite Veeck considering trading Hegan instead, Tipton was traded to the Chicago White Sox for Joe Haynes. Early in the season, White Sox manager Jack Onslow accused Tipton of tipping pitches after a loss to the St. Louis Browns and fined him $500. The two then fought and Tipton threatened to leave the team, but they buried the hatchet a short time later. He played in 67 games during the season, and ended the year with a .204 batting average and three triples.

On October 19, 1949, the White Sox traded Tipton to the Philadelphia Athletics for Nellie Fox. Fox played 14 years for the White Sox and went on to become a Hall of Famer, and as a result the trade is considered one of the most lopsided in baseball history. During spring training for the Athletics, Tipton battled Mike Guerra and Joe Astroth for the starting job at catcher. All three ended up splitting time over the course of the season. Tipton finished the year hitting .266 with six home runs and 20 RBIs in 64 games.

Jimmy Dykes took over as Athletics' manager in 1951, and had high hopes for Tipton heading into the season, saying that he "is a lot better catcher than most people think." In May, Tipton was hit in the head by a stray baseball bat during a game, and spent some time in the hospital as a result. He split time with Astroth and Ray Murray during the season, but appeared in a career-best 72 games, hitting .239 with 51 walks. After the season ended, Tipton was part of Lefty O'Doul's American baseball team that toured Japan. To start the 1952 season, Tipton was rumored to be the subject of a trade involving the Boston Red Sox and two of their players, but the deal never materialized. Tipton missed part of May with a kidney infection, and struggled upon returning, hitting .191 in 23 games. In late June, he was waived by the Athletics and picked up by the Indians. He spent the rest of the year with them, and finished with nine home runs, 30 RBIs, and a .225 average in 66 games.

Tipton remained the backup catcher to Hegan during the 1953 season. He battled a myriad of injuries throughout the season, including a bruised hand, a broken thumb, a split finger, and losing a fingernail. He finished the year with a .229 batting average in 47 games. On January 20, 1954, Tipton was traded to the Washington Senators for Mickey Grasso in an exchange of catchers. Manager Bucky Harris traded for Tipton in hopes that he would compete for the starting job due to his defense. Tipton served as the backup catcher to Ed Fitz Gerald in 1954. He made his last MLB appearance on September 26, and in 54 games he had a .223 average.

=== Later career (1955 - 1958) ===
The New York Giants purchased the contracts of Tipton and Wayne Terwilliger on January 14, 1955, who sent them to the minor league Minneapolis Millers. While Terwilliger played for the Millers that year, Tipton had planned to retire from baseball, and never played a game for Minneapolis. Later that year, White Sox general manager Frank Lane wanted him to join the Memphis Chickasaws so that the young pitchers in the minor leagues could work with a veteran catcher; Tipton obliged and joined the team for the 1955 season. In 60 games for the Chickasaws that season, Tipton had a .277 batting average and seven home runs.

After playing in the 60 games, Tipton was suspended after an argument with Chickasaws manager Jack Cassini, and after the season ended he retired from the game to work at his service station. He returned to baseball in 1957 and spent a season with the Birmingham Barons, and partway through the 1958 season, he joined the Panama City Fliers as manager. He was fired a month later, and in protest the Fliers refused to play their next game. Tipton retired afterwards, and a year later was banned for life from the minor leagues after it came to light that he accepted payouts by acting as a liaison for Jesse Levan, who was intentionally fouling off balls in order for gamblers in the stands to take advantage of them.

== Later life and death ==
His baseball career over, Tipton moved to Birmingham, Alabama with his wife and three children, where he ran a Ford automobile dealership. He was named to the Fannin County Sports Hall of Fame in 2013.

Tipton suffered from cardiac health issues for decades. In 1994, he died in Birmingham at the age of 72.
