= Gerard Ross (disambiguation) =

Gerard Ross is an American football player.

Gerard Ross may also refer to:

- Gerard Ross (musician)

== See also ==
- Gerard Ross Norton (1915–2004), South African recipient of the Victoria Cross
- Jerry Ross (disambiguation)
- Gerald Ross (disambiguation)
