= Verismo =

Style of opera

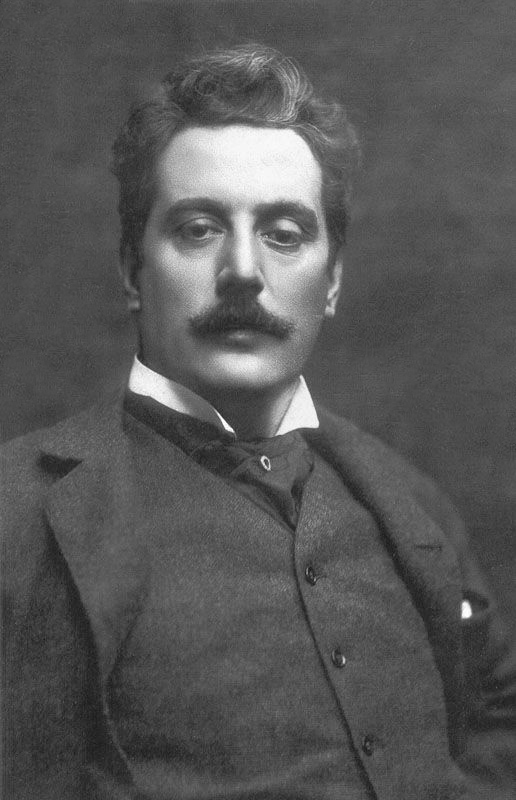
Giacomo Puccini, one of the composers most closely associated with verismo.

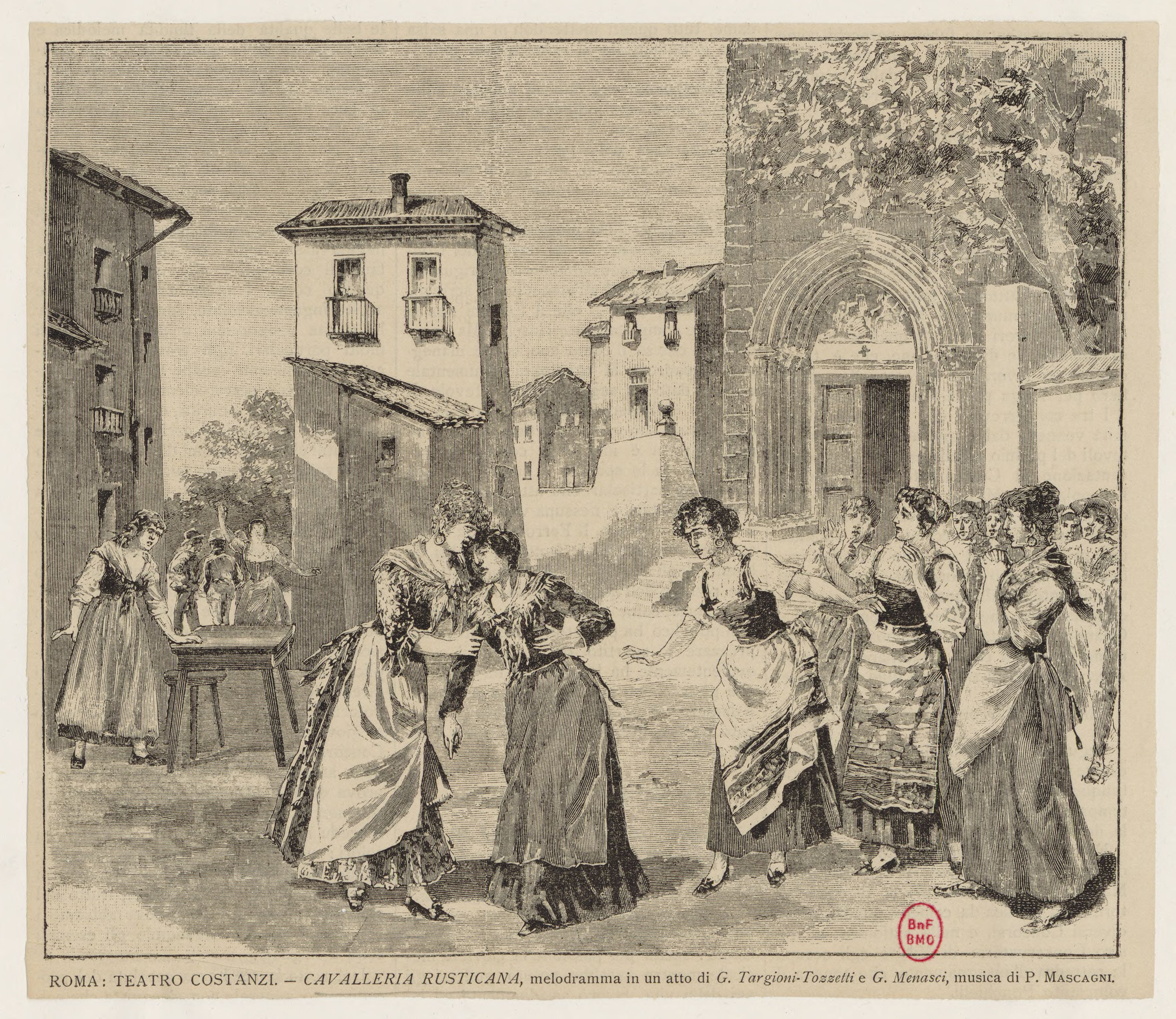
Cavelleria Rusticana, considered the first Verismo opera

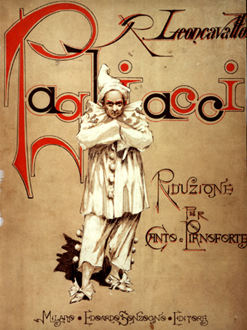
Pagliacci is a famous Verismo opera

Verismo (Italian for 'realism') in opera was a post-Romantic tradition of the late 19th to early 20th centuries associated with Italian composers like Pietro Mascagni, Ruggero Leoncavallo, Umberto Giordano, Francesco Cilea and Giacomo Puccini.

Verismo in opera had its origins in the Italian literary movement of the same name, which was in turn related to the international literary movement of naturalism practised by Émile Zola and others. Like naturalism, the verismo literary movement sought to portray the world with greater realism. In so doing, Italian verismo authors such as Giovanni Verga wrote about subject matter, such as the lives of the poor, that had not generally been seen as a fit subject for literature.

== History ==
A short story by Verga called Cavalleria rusticana (Italian for 'Rustic Chivalry'), then developed into a play by the same author, became the source for what is usually considered to be the first verismo opera: Cavalleria rusticana by Mascagni, which premiered on 17 May 1890 at the Teatro Costanzi in Rome. Thus begun, the operatic genre of verismo produced a handful of notable works such as Pagliacci, which premiered at Teatro Dal Verme in Milan on 21 May 1892, and Puccini's Tosca (premiering at the Teatro Costanzi in Rome on 14 January 1900). The genre peaked in the early 1900s, and lingered into the 1920s.

== Characteristics ==
In terms of subject matter, generally "verismo operas focused not on gods, mythological figures, or kings and queens, but on the average contemporary man and woman and their problems, generally of a sexual, romantic, or violent nature." However, three of the small handful of verismo operas still performed today take historical subjects: Puccini's Tosca, Giordano's Andrea Chénier and Cilea's Adriana Lecouvreur. In Opera After the Zero Hour: The Problem of Tradition and the Possibility of Renewal in Postwar West Germany, the music historian Emily Richmond Pollock writes that verismo's musical language reflects an aesthetic that emphasizes "the power of moment-by-moment emotional expressiveness that requires harmonic and formal flexibility, muscular but relatively unornamented vocal lines, and a fully developed orchestration full of high-contrast timbres." "Musically, verismo composers consciously strove for the integration of the opera's underlying drama with its music." These composers abandoned the "recitative and set-piece structure" of earlier Italian opera. Instead, the operas were "through-composed", with few breaks in a seamlessly integrated sung text. While verismo operas may contain arias that can be sung as stand-alone pieces, they are generally written to arise naturally from their dramatic surroundings, and their structure is variable, being based on text that usually does not follow a regular strophic format.

== Works ==
The most famous composers who created works in the verismo style were Giacomo Puccini, Pietro Mascagni, Ruggero Leoncavallo, Umberto Giordano and Francesco Cilea. There were, however, many other veristi: Franco Alfano, Alfredo Catalani, Gustave Charpentier (Louise), Eugen d'Albert (Tiefland), Ignatz Waghalter (Der Teufelsweg and Jugend), Alberto Franchetti, Franco Leoni, Jules Massenet (La Navarraise), Licinio Refice, Spyridon Samaras, Ermanno Wolf-Ferrari (I gioielli della Madonna), and Riccardo Zandonai.

== Style confusion ==
There has long been some confusion over the meaning of the term verismo. In addition to referring to operas written in a realistic style, verismo may also be used more broadly to refer to the entire output of the composers of the giovane scuola ("young school"), the generation of Italian composers who were active during the period that the verismo style was created. One author (Alan Mallach) has proposed the term "plebeian opera" to refer to operas that adhere to the contemporary and realistic subject matter for which the term verismo was originally coined. At the same time, Mallach questions the value of using a term such as verismo, which is supposedly descriptive of the subject and style of works, simply to identify an entire generation's music-dramatic output. For most of the composers associated with verismo, traditionally veristic subjects accounted for only some of their operas. For instance, Mascagni wrote a pastoral comedy (L'amico Fritz), a symbolist work set in Japan (Iris), and a couple of medieval romances (Isabeau and Parisina). These works are far from typical verismo subject matter, yet they are written in the same general musical style as his more quintessential veristic subjects. In addition, there is disagreement among musicologists as to which operas are verismo operas, and which are not. (Non-Italian operas are generally excluded). Giordano's Andrea Chénier, Cilea's Adriana Lecouvreur, Mascagni's Cavalleria rusticana, Leoncavallo's Pagliacci, and Puccini's Tosca and Il tabarro are operas to which the term verismo is applied with little or no dispute. The term is sometimes also applied to Puccini's Madama Butterfly and La fanciulla del West. Because only four verismo works not by Puccini continue to appear regularly on stage (the aforementioned Cavalleria rusticana, Pagliacci, Andrea Chénier and Adriana Lecouvreur), Puccini's contribution has had lasting significance to the genre.

Some authors have attempted to trace the origins of verismo opera to works that preceded Cavalleria rusticana, such as Georges Bizet's Carmen, or Giuseppe Verdi's La traviata. In fact, much of Verdi's style is accredited with influencing verismo-style opera. His use of suspense is reflective of a move towards greater intensity at the climax of arias. Modest Moussorgsky's Boris Godunov should not be ignored as an antecedent of verismo, especially because of Moussorgsky's focus on peasants, alongside princes and other aristocracy and church leaders, and his deliberate relating of the natural speech inflexions of the libretto to the rhythms of the sung music, different from, for example, Tchaikovsky's use of Pushkin's verse as a libretto.

== Verismo singers ==
The verismo opera style featured music that showed signs of more declamatory singing, in contrast to the traditional tenets of elegant, 19th-century bel canto singing that had preceded the movement, which were purely based on markings in the written music of authors preceding this "era". Opera singers adapted to the demands of the "new" style. The most extreme exponents of verismo vocalism sang habitually in a vociferous fashion, were focusing on the passionate aspect of music. They would 'beef up' the timbre of their voices, use greater amounts of vocal fold mass on their top notes, and often employ a conspicuous vibrato in order to accentuate the emotionalism of their ardent interpretations.

Some prominent practitioners of verismo singing during the movement's Italian lifespan (1890 to circa 1930) include the sopranos Eugenia Burzio, Lina Bruna Rasa and Bianca Scacciati, the tenors Aureliano Pertile, Cesar Vezzani and Amadeo Bassi, and the baritones Mario Sammarco and Eugenio Giraldoni. Their method of singing can be sampled on numerous 78-rpm gramophone recordings.

Great early-20th century international operatic stars Enrico Caruso, Rosa Ponselle and Titta Ruffo developed vocal techniques which harmoniously managed to combine fundamental bel canto precepts with a more 'modern', straightforward mode of ripe-toned singing when delivering verismo music, and their example has influenced operatic performers down to this day (see Scott).

== See also ==
- Verismo (literature)
- Verismo (painting)
- American Verismo
- Italian opera
