= Temple Beth Zion (Buffalo, New York) =

Reform synagogue in Buffalo, New York, US

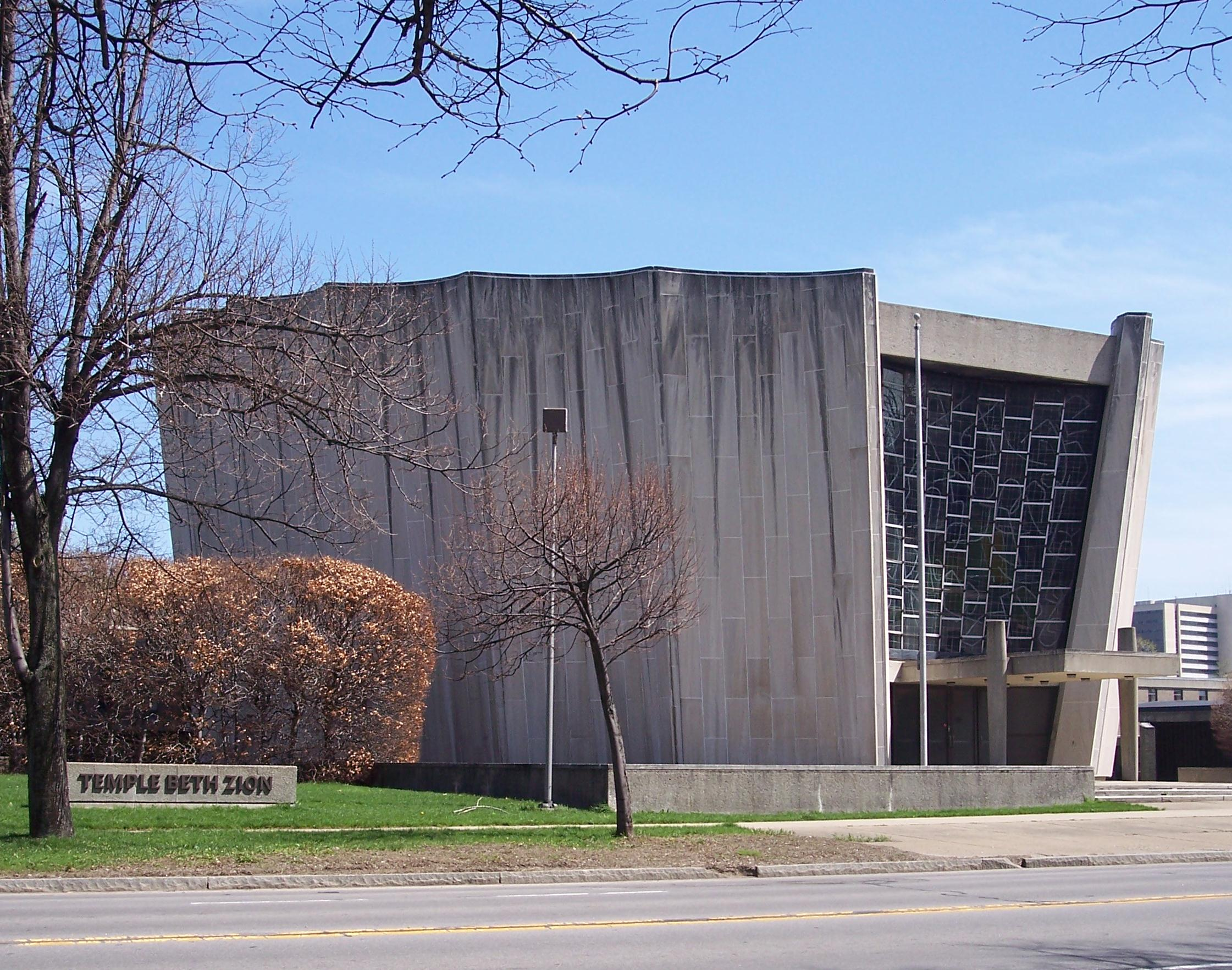
- Beth Zion synagogue, in 2011

- Location in New York

Religion
- Affiliation: Reform Judaism
- Ecclesiastical or organizational status: Synagogue
- Leadership: Rabbi Brent P. Gutmann
- Status: Active
- Organ: Casavant Frères

Location
- Location: 805 Delaware Avenue, Buffalo, Erie County, New York
- Country: United States
- Interactive map of Temple Beth Zion
- Coordinates: 42°54′23″N 78°52′18″W

Architecture
- Architects: Edward Austin Kent (1890); Max Abramovitz (1967)
- Type: Synagogue
- Style: Modernist
- Creator: Ben Shahn; with Benoît Gilsoul (stained glass, interior artwork)
- General contractor: Siegfried Construction Co.
- Established: 1850 (as a congregation)
- Groundbreaking: June 21, 1964
- Completed: 1864 (Niagara Street); 1890 (599 Delaware Avenue); 1967 (805 Delaware Avenue)

Specifications
- Capacity: 1,000 worshippers
- Height (max): 62 feet (18.9 m)
- Materials: Alabama limestone

Website
- tbz.org
- Temple Beth Zion
- U.S. National Register of Historic Places
- Area: 3.81 acres (1.54 ha)
- NRHP reference No.: 100001965
- Added to NRHP: January 16, 2018

Temple Beth Zion is a Reform Jewish synagogue located at 805 Delaware Avenue, in Buffalo, Erie County, New York, in the United States. Founded in 1850, Temple Beth Zion is the largest Jewish congregation in Western New York and one of the oldest and largest Reform congregations in the nation. Originally an Orthodox congregation, TBZ reorganized as a Reform congregation in 1863.

The Max Abramovitz-designed scalloped oval Modernist building features ten scallop walls, each a symbol of the 10 commandments, and two 30-foot-high (9.1 m) commandment tablets. The synagogue walls rise 45 feet (14 m) from the entrance, flaring outward at 15 degrees, firmly anchored to a pedestal 50 feet (15 m) below ground level. Ben Shahn, an artist, painter and calligrapher, designed the sanctuary's stained windows, the Commandment Tablets, and the menorah. The synagogue contains a Casavant Frères 48-rank, 4000-pipe organ. The synagogue was listed on the National Register of Historic Places in 2018, located within the Delaware Avenue Historic District.

The Benjamin and Dr. Edgar R. Cofeld Judaic Museum, co-located adjacent to the synagogue, features a rotating collection of Judaica.

== Previous buildings ==
Before building their current synagogue, the congregation worshiped in two previous buildings. The first building was the old Niagara Street Methodist Church (between Pearl Street and Franklin Street). The church was renovated, rededicated, and used as the home of Temple Beth Zion until 1886. The second building was a Byzantine-styled, copper-domed temple built in 1890, designed by Edward Austin Kent, and located at 599 Delaware Avenue (now the site of the Clinical Research Center). That building was destroyed in a fire in 1961.

== Gallery ==
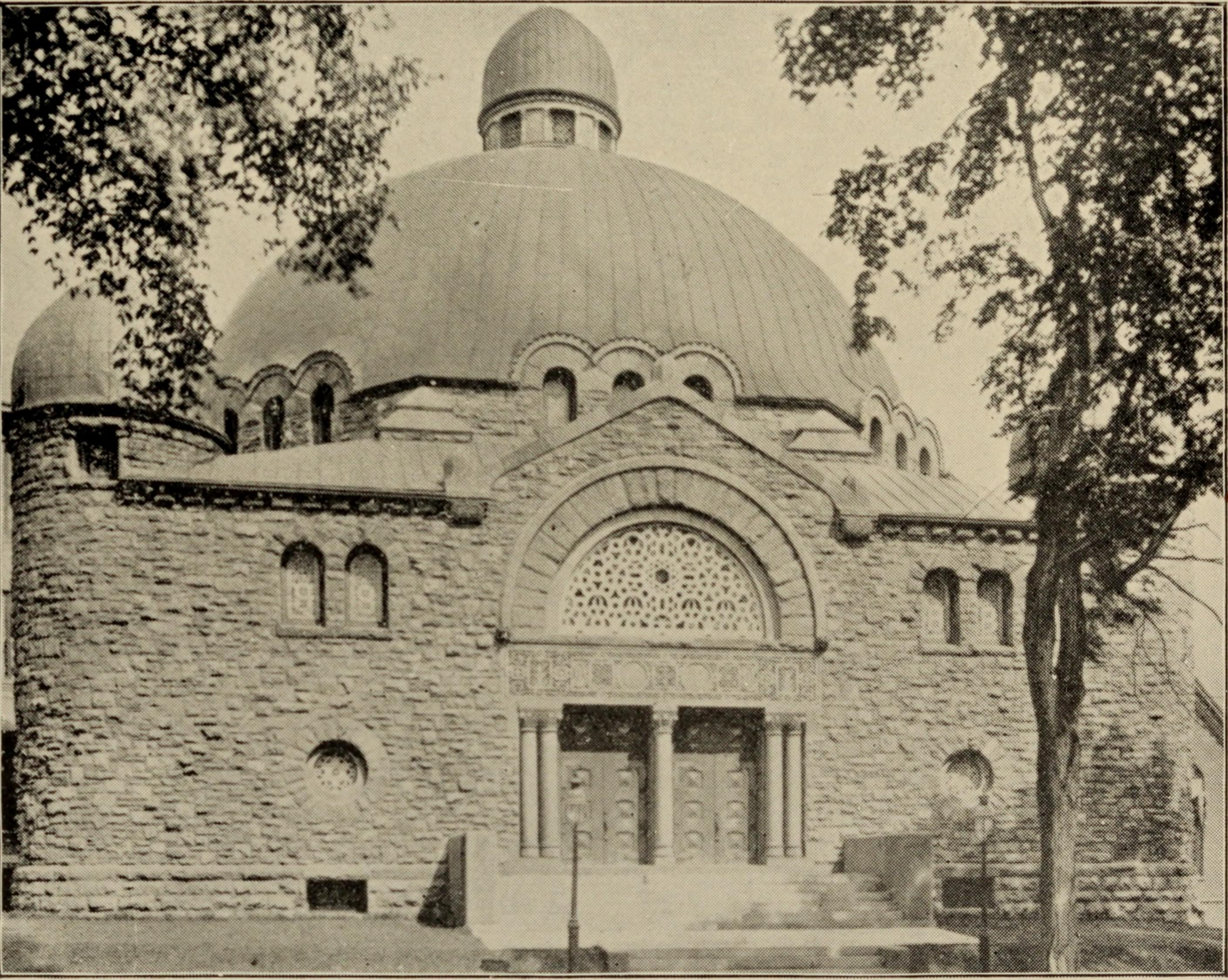
Temple Beth Zion, 1896

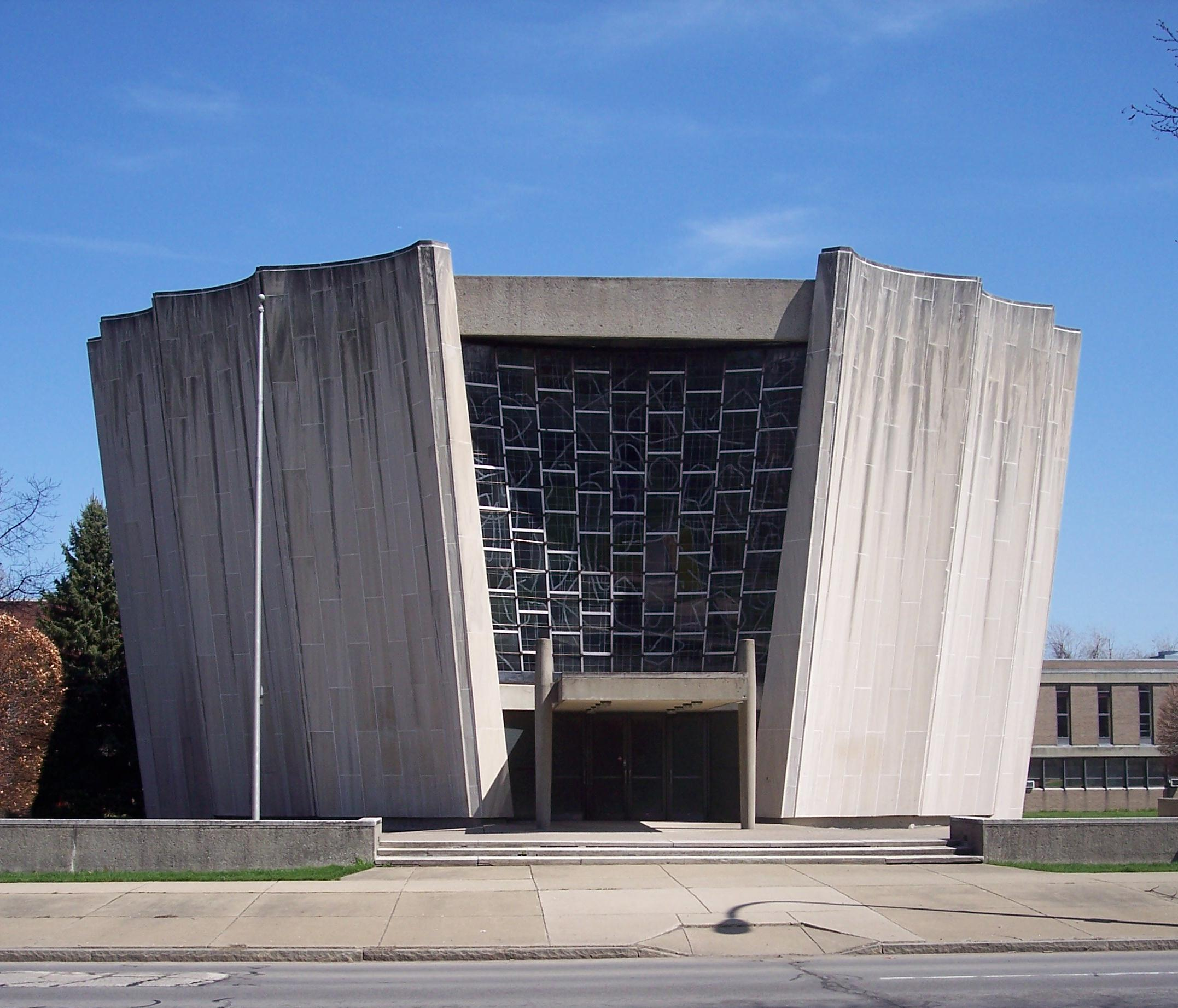
Entrance to the modernist synagogue, in 2011

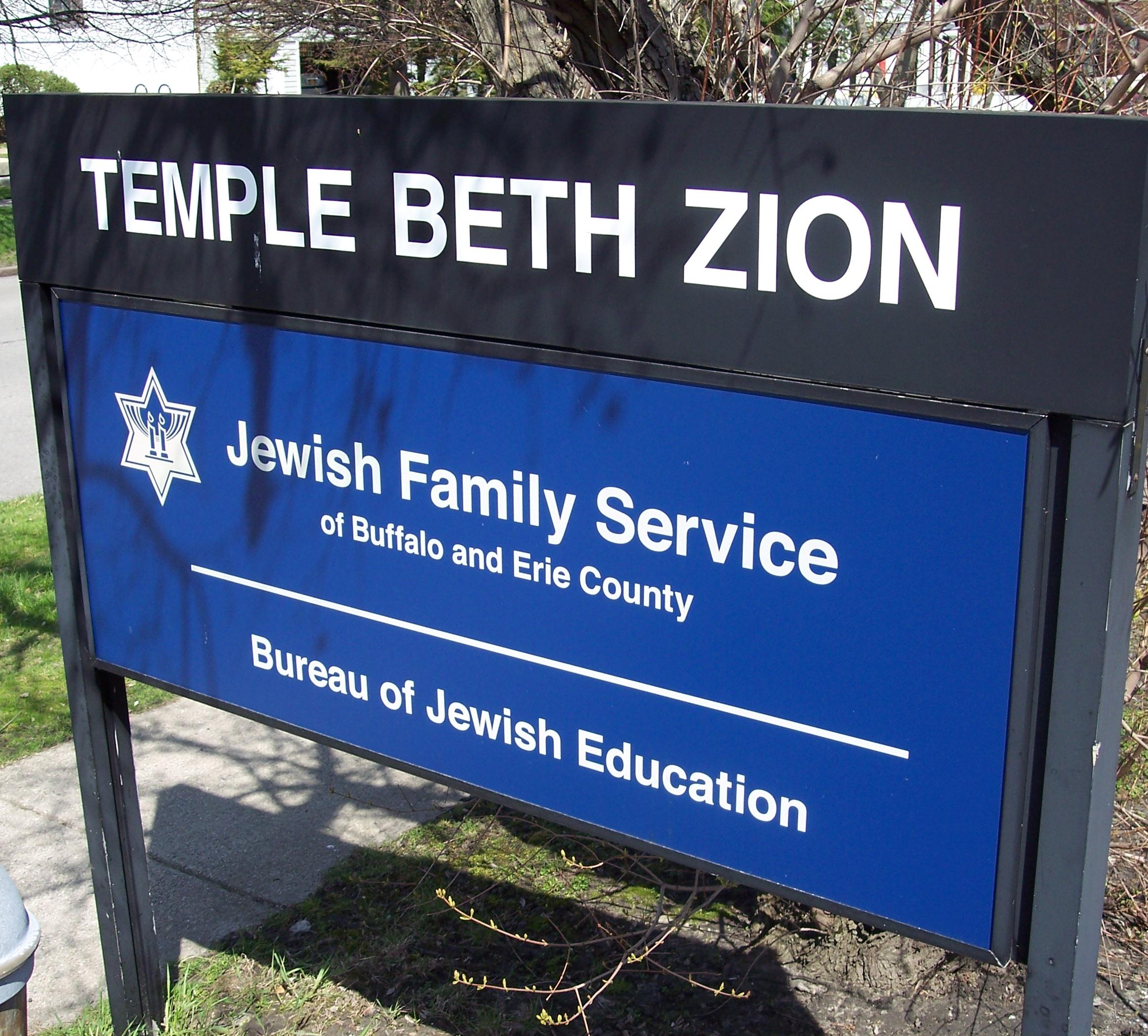
Sign adjacent to the synagogue
