= Unitarian Universalist Church of Buffalo =

Historic church in New York, United States

- First Unitarian Church of Buffalo
- U.S. National Register of Historic Places
- U.S. Historic district – Contributing property
- New York State Register of Historic Places
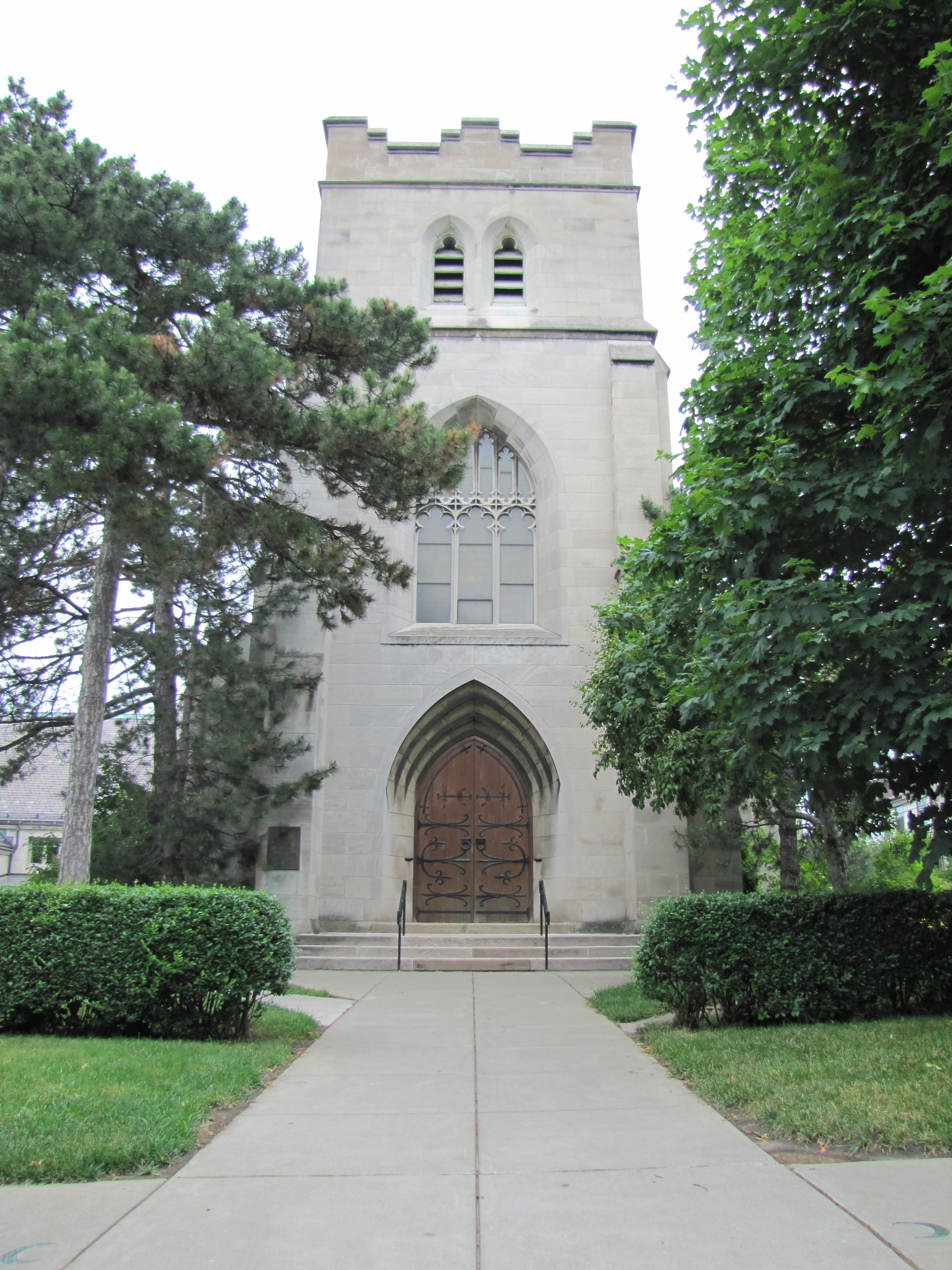
- Unitarian Universalist Church of Buffalo, June 2011

- Location within New York Location within the United States
- Location: 695 Elmwood Avenue, Buffalo, New York
- Coordinates: 42°54′56″N 78°52′35″W
- Area: .53 acres (0.21 ha)
- Built: 1904-1906
- Architect: Edward Austin Kent
- Architectural style: English Gothic
- Website: buffalouu.org
- NRHP reference No.: 15000367
- NYSRHP No.: 02940.001858

Significant dates
- Added to NRHP: June 30, 2015
- Designated NYSRHP: April 21, 2015

The Unitarian Universalist Church of Buffalo is an historic church complex located at 695 Elmwood Avenue, in Buffalo, New York. The building was designed by architect Edward Austin Kent in 1906. Kent died in 1912 aboard the RMS Titanic and a memorial plaque is located in the church honoring him.

The congregation is currently affiliated with the Unitarian Universalist Association. The church building was originally called the First Unitarian Church of Buffalo and was affiliated with the American Unitarian Association. In 1953, the congregation was joined by the Universalist Church of the Messiah, which was affiliated with the Universalist Church of America and began worshiping together as the Unitarian Universalist Church of Buffalo. Coincidentally, both congregations were organized in 1831 and the two denominations merged nationally in 1961.

== Church building ==
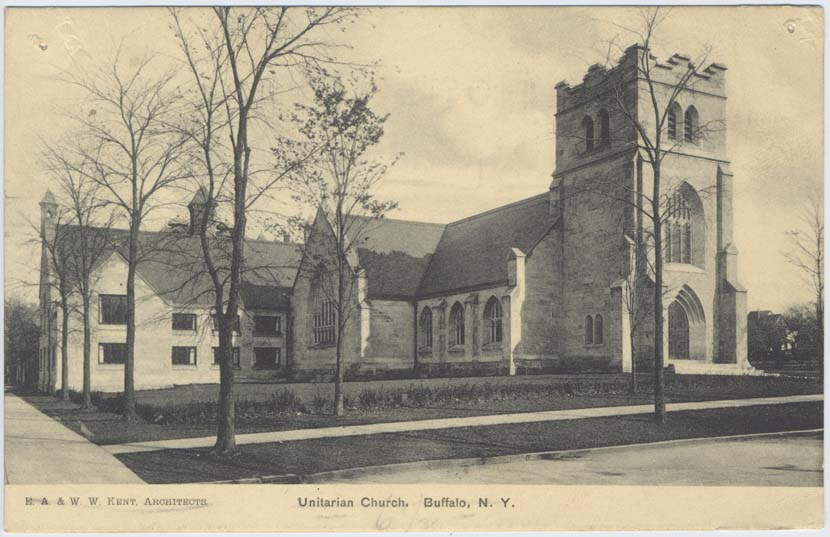
Unitarian Church of Buffalo

The sanctuary and building was completed in 1906 on land donated by John J. Albright, who built the Albright–Knox Art Gallery in Buffalo, New York completed in 1905. In 1908, Col. Charles Clifton paid the remaining $25,000 of the mortgage on the church building on the condition that the pews would be forever free. The church is designed in a Gothic Revival style with walls and tracery in the arched windows of Indiana limestone, a crenelated turret, and oak doors decorated with wrought-iron fleur-de-lis. The interior of the church is English Country Gothic in style. The sanctuary has seating for 400 and features a great oak hammer beam ceiling soaring from stone corbels about ten feet above the floor.

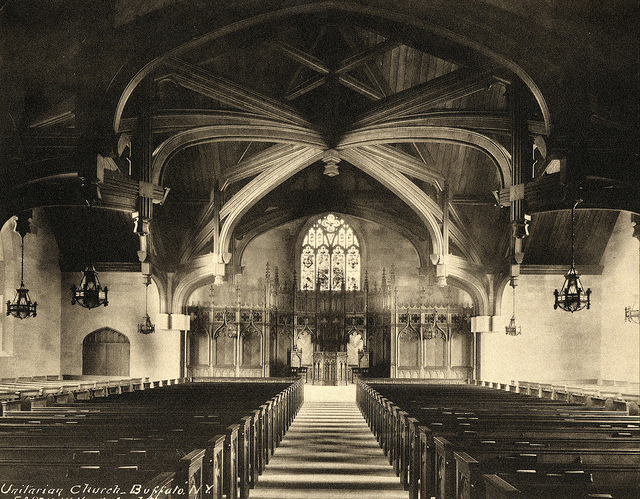
View of the Sanctuary

The walls and floor are of the same Indiana limestone as the exterior. Their plainness serves as contrast to the oak and glass decorative elements.

The Art Nouveau stained glass windows were designed by Harry E. Goodhue, of Boston who also designed stained glass windows for Saint Martin's Church, Providence. The pipe organ in the choir loft was built by the Hutchings-Votey Organ Company in 1906. Hutchings-Votey also built the Newberry Memorial Organ in Woolsey Hall at Yale University and the Naval Academy Chapel Organ located in the United States Naval Academy Chapel in Annapolis, Maryland. The Delaware Organ Company of Tonawanda, New York rebuilt the organ in 1960.

The church was listed on the National Register of Historic Places on June 30, 2015, as the First Unitarian Church of Buffalo. It is located in the Elmwood Historic District–East.

== McCann Memorial Library ==
The McCann Memorial Library contains approximately 2,700 books covering a wide variety of topics including all aspects of Unitarian Universalism. The adult collection contains books on the various religions of the world, philosophy, spiritual readings, life issues (e.g. death, divorce, discipline, women's role, LGBTQ issues), environmentalism, religious education, inspiring fiction and poetry, among others. The collections for children and youth contain books to help young people deal with various life issues, as well as many traditional books for casual readers.

== Notable events ==
Bruce Beyer's arrest at the church, 1968

On August 7, 1968, Bruce Beyer took refuge in the church after refusing to be conscripted to take part in the Vietnam War. Beyer had been christened in the church and his adoptive father was a church elder. Ten days later, police raised the church and arrested Beyer.

== Unitarian Universalist principles ==
There are seven principles which Unitarian Universalist congregations affirm and promote:

- The inherent worth and dignity of every person;
- Justice, equity and compassion in human relations;
- Acceptance of one another and encouragement to spiritual growth in our congregations;
- A free and responsible search for truth and meaning;
- The right of conscience and the use of the democratic process within our congregations and in society at large;
- The goal of world community with peace, liberty, and justice for all;
- Respect for the interdependent web of all existence of which we are a part.

== See also ==
- Unitarianism
- Universalism
- Unitarian Universalism
- Edward Austin Kent
- John J. Albright
