= Van Dykes =

American band of lesbian separatist vegans

The Van Dykes were an itinerant band of lesbian separatist vegans, founded in 1977 in the United States by Heather Elizabeth and Ange Spalding. Members of the group identified as dykes and lived in vans, traveling throughout Canada, the United States, and Mexico, stopping only on womyn's land.

== History ==
In 1976, Heather Elizabeth Nelson, her ex-girlfriend Chris Fox, and another lesbian couple had purchased a run-down farm seventy miles outside of Toronto in an attempt to create womyn's land where agricultural self-sustenance, separatism, and non-monogamy were practiced. Elizabeth met Ange Spalding on a road trip to Toronto, who had been living in her van for a year. Together Elizabeth and Spalding formed the Van Dykes, with Spalding taking on the name Brook Van Dyke while Elizabeth became Heather Van Dyke and later the name Lamar Van Dyke (named after Hedy Lamarr). Chris Fox became Thorn Van Dyke. The Van Dykes shaved their heads, avoided men unless necessary, and believed that the world was being subjected to testosterone poisoning. After driving to Texas, several more women had joined the caravan: Thorn's girlfriend Judith Van Dyke, Sky Van Dyke and Birch Van Dyke. Together, six Van Dykes drove four vans to the Yucatán Peninsula, visiting Chichén Itzá. The caravan stayed in Cozumel for several weeks at the home of a lesbian named Paloma. In Cozumel, the Van Dykes were arrested by the Mexican Police on unclear charges and held in jail for several hours. An attempt to drive to Belize was aborted and the Van Dykes returned to the United States. The Van Dykes visited womyn's land in Arizona, Arkansas, California, Florida, North Carolina, Oregon, Texas, and New Mexico. After Judith Van Dyke met the sex-positive feminists Pat Califia and Gayle Rubin in San Francisco, who were affiliated with a lesbian BDSM group called Samois, the Van Dykes embraced S/M and leather culture. In 1979, the Van Dykes created the first S/M workshop at the Michigan Womyn's Music Festival, which caused controversy.

Lamar Van Dyke chronicled the adventures of the Van Dykes in a comic book titled "Van Dyke Comix."

== See also ==
- Feminist separatism
- Lesbian utopia
- Radical lesbianism
