= McKinley Mall =

Shopping mall in Hamburg, New York

- McKinley Mall Logo
- Location: Hamburg, New York
- Coordinates: 42.7844°N 78.8074°W
- Opened: October 7, 1985
- Developer: Zamias Services, Inc.
- Owner: Kohan Retail Investment Group; Summit Properties USA
- Num. of stores: 55
- Num. of anchor tenants: 4
- Floor area: 800,000 square feet (74,000 m^{2})
- Website: www.shopmckinleymall.com

McKinley Mall, is a shopping mall near Buffalo, New York in Hamburg, New York, at the intersection of McKinley Parkway and Milestrip Road (New York State Route 179) immediately east of Interstate 90 and the New York State Thruway. McKinley Mall services the Southtowns of Erie County, New York. The mall's anchors are Best Buy, Old Navy, Barnes & Noble, and JCPenney.

== History ==
McKinley Mall opened on October 7, 1985, with 80 stores, including a food court known as "The Garden." It also featured anchors AM&A's, The Sample, and Sears. In 1986, a six screen General Cinema Theatre opened. The mall's construction was controversial in the adjoining town of Hamburg, because of the development it brought.

Local chain L. L. Berger opened a 40,000-square-foot (3,700-square-meter) store on August 15, 1988. Sibley's opened on April 6, 1989, relocating from the Seneca Mall. 1989 also saw the opening of the Walden Galleria 10 miles north in Cheektowaga. A super-regional mall, the Galleria helped accelerate the death of many aging surrounding malls including the Seneca Mall, and the Thruway Mall. However, the Mckinley Mall served the Southtowns of Western New York. In 1990, Sibley's was converted to Pittsburgh-based Kaufmann's. JCPenney opened in 1991. That same year, the L. L. Berger chain closed after filing for Chapter 11 Bankruptcy. Their store at the mall became Kaufmann's Home Store in 1994.

In 1994, York, Pennsylvania-based store The Bon-Ton opened after purchasing Buffalo-based AM&A's the same year.

In 2006 it was announced that Bed Bath and Beyond would open a store in the Sears wing on the mall's western side while Best Buy announced they would open a store next door. In September 2006 Kaufmann's became Macy's.

In 2016, Macy's closed. In April 2018, The Bon-Ton closed when the parent chain went out of business. In February, 2020, Sears closed.

On July 28, 2021, the Kohan Retail Investment Group purchased McKinley Mall for $8.5 million.

== See also ==
- The Summit
- Eastern Hills Mall
- Boulevard Mall
