= The Sample =

Defunct New York department store chain

- Industry: Retail
- Founded: 1928
- Defunct: 1991
- Fate: Bankruptcy
- Headquarters: Buffalo, New York,
- Products: Clothing

The Sample, also known as The Sample Dress Shop or The Sample Shop, was a family-owned, high end department store specializing in upscale ladies clothing and furnishings based in Buffalo, New York. The original store was established by Anne W. Bunis on Hertel Avenue in North Buffalo in 1928. The company started when Mrs. Bunis returned from a trip to New York City with a set of 48 "sample" dresses, which she in turn sold for $12.75 each. Expansion occurred during the early 1950s with stores at Lancaster, New York; Lockport, New York; Thruway Plaza (later Thruway Mall) in Cheektowaga, New York; South Buffalo at 2182 Seneca Street; and Downtown Buffalo at 554 Main Street, the former home of Flint & Kent. The Downtown Buffalo store closed in 1959. In 1961, a store opened in Amherst, New York and in 1969, a store opened at Seneca Mall in West Seneca, New York. In 1971, a store opened at Eastern Hills Mall, with another store opening up at the Summit Park Mall in 1972, and in 1985, a store opened in McKinley Mall in Hamburg, New York. The last store in the then 11-store chain opened in 1988 at Walden Galleria in Cheektowaga, New York. In 1990, following the death of company chairman Maer Bunis, the company began a rapid descent into bankruptcy. On January 31, 1991, the flagship Hertel Avenue store closed.

The Sample was famous for its "Pup Sale", the semi-annual clearance sale heralded in the newspaper advertisements which blamed the excess merchandise on their buyer's "whims, poor taste or their supposed temporary insanity." The "pups" referred to the excess merchandise which was sold at very low prices. The Pup Sales were quite crowded and generally thought of as the most popular clothing sale of the year in all of Buffalo by its shoppers. The ads had a considerable effect on sales.
