= Niagara Frontier Transportation Authority =

Public transit operator in Erie and Niagara Counties, New York

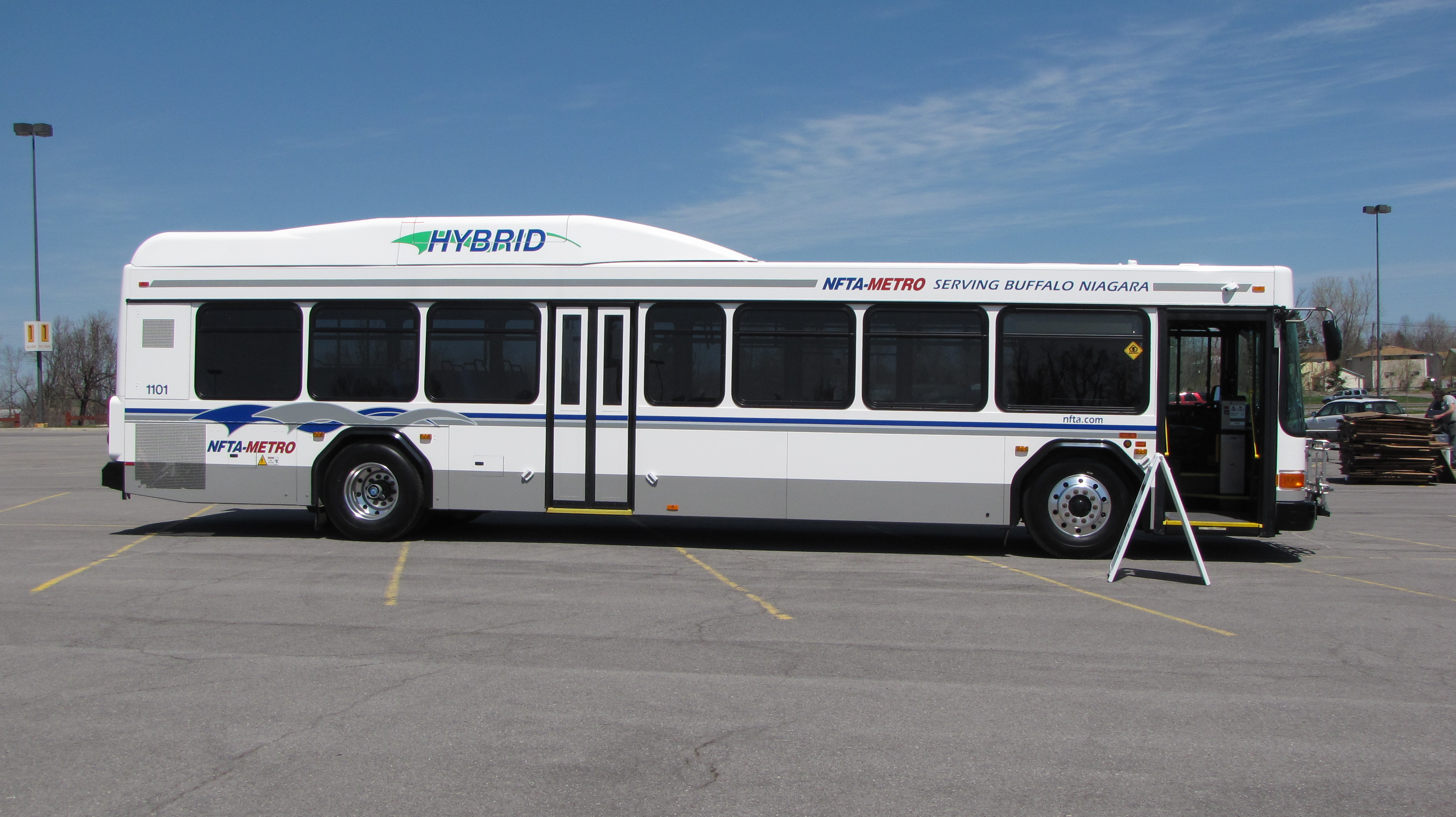

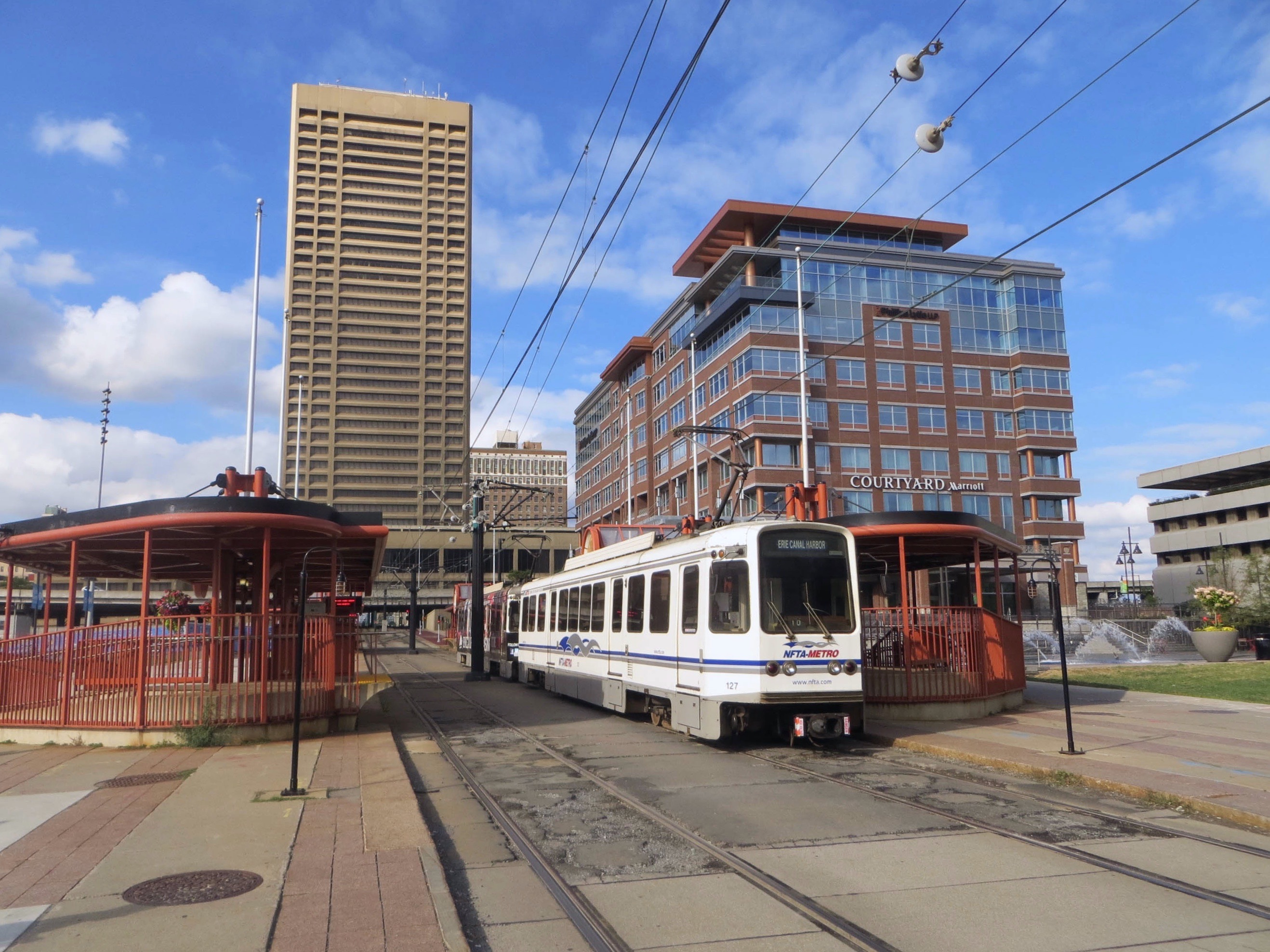

Overview
- Owner: State of New York
- Locale: Erie and Niagara Counties, New York
- Transit type: Bus, Light rail
- Number of lines: 61 bus routes, Buffalo Metro Rail
- Number of stations: 13 (light rail)
- Daily ridership: 61,400 (weekdays, Q2 2026)
- Annual ridership: 16,262,500 (2025)
- Chief executive: Kimberley A. Minkel
- Headquarters: Buffalo Metropolitan Transportation Center; Buffalo, New York
- Website: nfta.com

Operation
- Began operation: 1967
- Number of vehicles: 325 buses, 27 light rail (2017)

The Niagara Frontier Transportation Authority (NFTA) is the public agency responsible for operating most public transportation services in the Buffalo–Niagara Falls metropolitan area. The NFTA, as an authority, oversees a number of subsidiaries, including the NFTA Metro bus and rail system, the Buffalo-Niagara International Airport, the Niagara Falls International Airport and NFTA Small Boat Harbor. The NFTA Metro bus and rail system is a multi-modal agency, utilizing various vehicle modes (diesel bus, diesel-hybrid bus, CNG bus, light rail and cut-away van), using the brand names: NFTA Metro Bus, NFTA Metro Rail, NFTA Metrolink and NFTA PAL (Para-transit Access Line). In 2025, the system had a ridership of 16,262,500, or about 61,400 per weekday as of the second quarter of 2026.

In addition, the NFTA also owns and manages a number of properties, including the Buffalo Metropolitan Transportation Center in Downtown Buffalo (which serves as the agency's headquarters); the Niagara Falls Transportation Center on Factory Outlet Boulevard; the Portage Road Transit Center in Niagara Falls; and a number of strategically located bus loops and transit centers in the Buffalo Niagara region. Of note, many of the bus loops have been in continuous operation since the days of the International Railway Company, a predecessor to the NFTA. Agency-wide, the NFTA employs 1,500 full-time and part-time employees.

There are three business centers that operate as the NFTA organization: Surface Transportation, which handles ground transportation throughout Erie and Niagara counties, Aviation, which handles air related business at the Buffalo-Niagara International Airport and Niagara Falls International Airport and Property Risk/Management, which operates the NFTA-Boat Harbor and handles other properties that are owned and/or operated by the NFTA.

== History ==
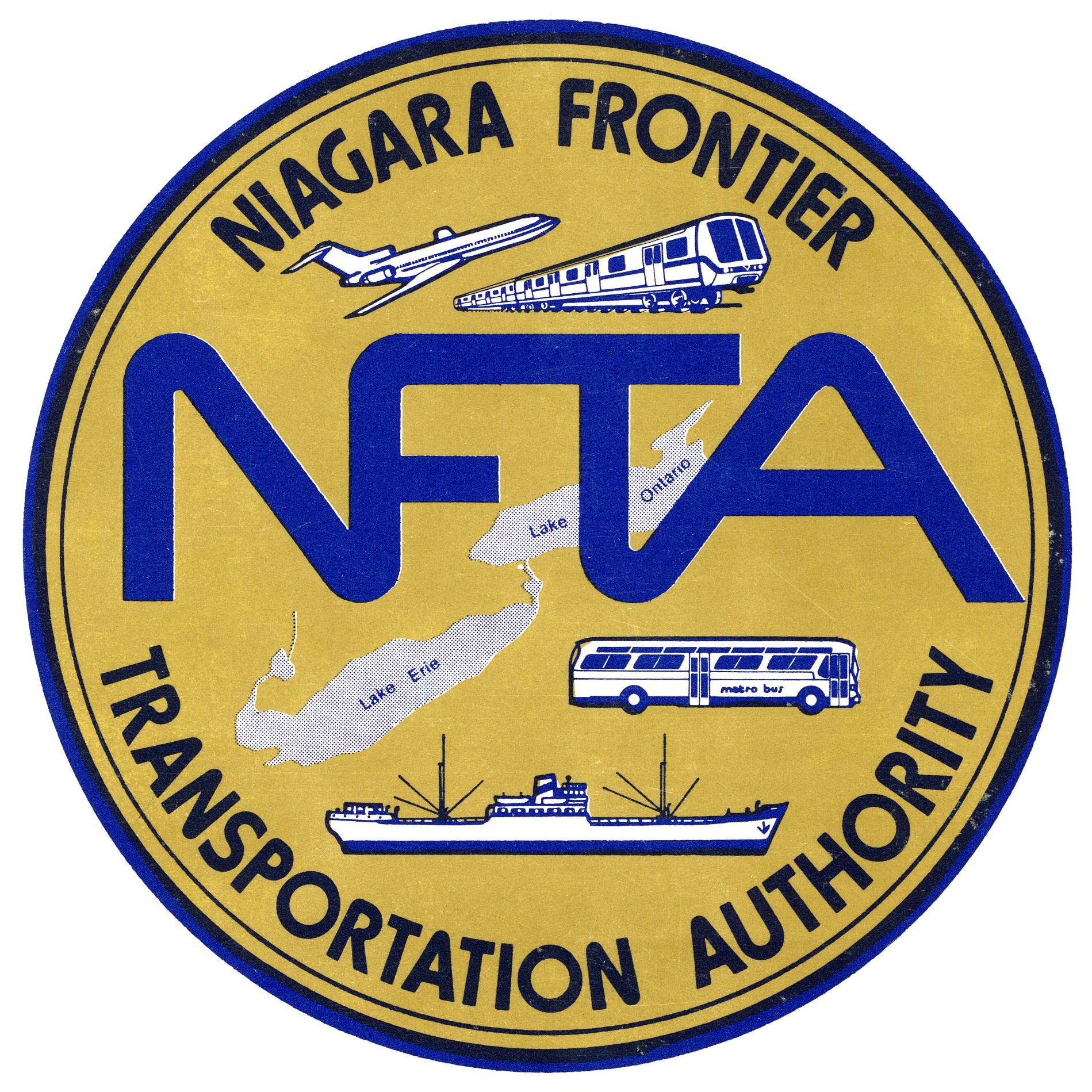
1975 logo of NFTA

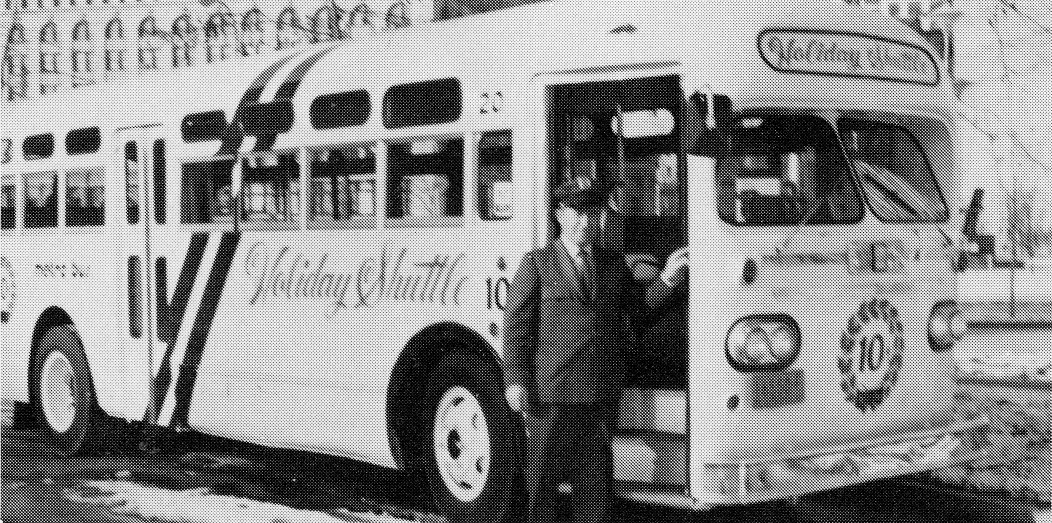
1974 Holiday bus

Before the creation of the Niagara Frontier Transportation Authority, the first bus operations in Buffalo dates back to 1923 under the private operator International Bus Company. The International Railway Company (also under the same parent company of the International Traction Company) operated the vast network of streetcar routes in Erie and Niagara counties. In 1947, the proposed Niagara Frontier Rapid Transit Commission received ownership of the International Railway Company, which declared bankruptcy, and gave way to the creation of the Niagara Frontier Transit System, incorporated in 1950.

The Niagara Frontier Transit System was replaced by the Niagara Frontier Transportation Authority Corp. (NFTA) in 1967, as part of New York State's efforts in the late 1960s and early 1970s at creating public agencies that would oversee the development and continuation of public transportation in a number of key urban areas of the state; other such agencies include the Rochester Genesee Regional Transportation Authority (RGRTA), the Central New York Regional Transportation Authority (Centro) and the Capital District Transportation Authority (CDTA). In 1974, the NFTA purchased the street transportation rights from a number of other agencies, starting with the Niagara Falls Municipal Transit System on September 8, D&F (Dunkirk and Fredonia) Transit on September 15, T-NT (Tonawanda-North Tonawanda) Transit on October 7, Lockport Bus Lines on March 15, 1975, and Grand Island Transit on April 20, 1975. Administrative offices and buses were housed in the former Niagara Frontier Transit Buildings at 855 Main Street (now the site of Buffalo Manufacturing Works) until 1977, at which point the offices were moved to the Buffalo Metropolitan Transportation Center.

== Governing body and executive director ==
The NFTA's operations are overseen by a 12-member Board of Commissioners that the executive director reports to. The members are nominated by the Governor of the State of New York, with two chosen by the Erie County Executive. Most appointments are for five-year terms, but some commissioners have been appointed partway into a term, replacing a previous commissioner.

== Metro Division ==
=== Service area ===
NFTA's Metro system serves the highly urbanized areas of Erie and Niagara counties with service throughout the day and selected suburban and rural areas of Erie and Niagara counties. The cities receiving service include Buffalo, Niagara Falls, Lockport, Lackawanna, Tonawanda and North Tonawanda. Service to less populated areas during prime ridership hours extend to Alden, Amherst, Boston, Cheektowaga, Grand Island, Hamburg, Lancaster, Elma, Evans, Orchard Park, Tonawanda (Township), East Aurora and West Seneca in Erie County; Cambria, Lewiston, Niagara, Pendleton and Wheatfield in Niagara County.

=== Transit fleet ===
The NFTA operates a fleet of approximately 310 transit buses (all of which are low-floor, wheelchair-accessible and ADA compliant), 64 paratransit and Metrolink cutaway vans and 27 light rail cars, all operating up to 22 hours daily on 78 distinct routes.

The bus fleet contains buses purchased from manufacturers such as Nova Bus in their LFS transit bus (in both standard diesel and Compressed Natural Gas options) and Gillig in their Advantage transit bus (later recognized as their low floor T40 series, in standard diesel and diesel/electric hybrid options). The distribution of buses are split between three bus depots: Gisel-Wolford (also known as Babcock-William), located at 721 New Babcock Street (at Howard Street), Cold Spring (also known as Main-Michigan), located at 1581 Michigan Avenue (at Main Street)-- both on the east side of Buffalo—and Frontier (also known as Kenmore-Military), located at 1000 Military Road (at Kenmore Avenue) on the Buffalo-Kenmore border. The light rail fleet operates from the DL&W terminal on South Park Avenue behind KeyBank Center in the Cobblestone District.

=== Bus routes ===
Many of the routes in the City of Buffalo operate along nearly the same alignment of the previous International Railway Company's streetcar lines. After the elimination of streetcar service, many adjustments have been made in routing through Downtown Buffalo to allow better connections between routes connecting the city's east side and west side, with many of the routes operating through at least one of two of the major transfer points: the Buffalo Metropolitan Transportation Center at the corner of North Division and Ellicott Streets and on Court Street between Niagara Square and Main Streets. The Buffalo Metropolitan Transportation Center is also the transfer point for inter-city bus service using Greyhound, Coach USA or Greyhound Lines of Canada. The routes follow a certain numbering schematic.

- 1-49: Erie County routes
- 50-57: Niagara County routes
- 60-81: express routes
- 90-99: special services (Buffalo Bills, Darien Lake, etc.)
- 100-121: Buffalo Public School trips
- 200-216: Metro Link routes

It has been normal practice for each route to be given a separate timetable, which includes a map of the route on the front, fare and pass information on the back panel and information on the times and days service is offered. Not all stops are listed in the timetables, however, but passengers can expect to see at least major transfer points and busy intersections. When boarding a bus or light rail car, the rider should note the following:

- The front of the vehicle destination sign shows the route number, the routing letter (for routes with multiple branches) and the destination (usually a community or the major street where the trip terminates). The side of the bus will carry the route number and the route name, to assure the passenger they are boarding the correct route. On occasion, a bus may also show a second message, such as "via Expressway" or "via Thruway." The service planning department of the NFTA monitors ridership levels, historical data from previous years and looks for the most efficient way to offer services on an approximately quarterly basis. With this, timetables are generally updated four times a year: March, June, September and December. When Buffalo Public Schools are on break or summer recess, there may be decreases in the service levels to accommodate for decreased ridership. Beginning Labor Day weekend, service reverts to the normal levels.

==== Planned routes ====
===== Hublink (MetroLink) =====
The NFTA's original "Hublink" concept, now renamed "MetroLink," created a network of routes (numbered in the 200 and 300 series range) linking multiple transit centers together, using cutaway vans. A minimum service standard was created, where buses were to operate on a frequent schedule through the day, moving passengers across the region. Additionally, circulatory routes were to be created linking passengers with community-based services for a number of high-density areas that cannot support normal city bus transit service. Though refined from the earlier plans, some routes came to reality. Routes 200 and 201 were the first two routes; route 200 North Tonawanda-Wheatfield operating across the width of the City of North Tonawanda to get to Creekside Park and Ride lot and then Niagara Falls Boulevard to Niagara Falls International Airport and route 201 Lockport serving the City of Lockport on a circulatory route serving the Lockport Memorial Hospital, the senior citizens center and Downtown Lockport. Both routes were also scheduled to connect to conventional service routes at their end terminals or transit centers they arrive at along the route.

===== 2010 restructuring =====
In the middle part of 2009, the NFTA hired Transportation Management and Design, Inc. to begin a "Transit Service Restructuring and Fare Study," that would involve some of the largest changes that the riding public has seen since March 24, 1993, when the NFTA's "New" Metro system was introduced. Some of the new proposals included reducing the number of fare zones to a single zone and creating a uniform boarding fare without additional fees for crossing particular fare zone lines, elimination of bus-to-bus transfers and modifying the pricing of cash fares, monthly and daily passes. The proposals were passed and went into effect effective September 1, 2010.

On the scheduling side, more emphasis would be taken on urban services, primarily within the City of Buffalo. Service on primary corridors, such as those serving densely patronized routes could find an increase in service levels during non-peak hours, promoting spontaneous usage. Lightly patronized routes were reduced to fit ridership statistics and allow the agency to more effectively use the buses on heavier patronized routes. In addition, weekend service was improved significantly on many city routes with Sunday service nearly tripled on certain portions of some routes. Approval of the plan was reached between TMD, Inc. and the NFTA executive board in late June 2010 and the changes were implemented with a special later autumn schedule change on October 31, 2010. The NFTA Metro service planning department adjusted the schedules leading up to the following schedule change, based on driver input, customer complaints and other sources, most notably adding services where necessary due to excessive passenger loads.

===== 2012 restructuring =====
On September 26, 2011, the NFTA reported that the agency could face as much as a $15 million shortfall in funding due to cuts in funding at the state level. Facing a directive to cut into the deficit created, the NFTA considered a fare hike, in addition to a number of service cuts to routes with low usage. Four days later, on September 30, patrons of the system came back crying 'foul,' demanding retaining the present service levels and fares. The following month, the NFTA lobbied the state to return $10 million in cuts previously made.

In December 2011, the NFTA held a number of public hearings regarding a fare increase that was quickly met with hostility from the riding public. On December 7, the NFTA rejected the fare hike and focused on a severe reduction (22%) to bus service that would effective eliminate express bus services, gut bus services to Niagara County and reduce and eliminate hours and days of operation on a number of bus services. Again, public hearings were held and met with the same hostility as the fare cut proposal. On January 19, 2012, the NFTA was assured of a return of $2.9 million to reduce some of the service cuts the NFTA had planned. A final hearing brought a plan to lessen the impact of the previous number of service cuts and raise the adult fare by 25 cents, with small increases to other Metro fare plans. The board approved the plan to make the changes in late March, to take effect on April 29 (bus and rail modifications) and May 1 for fare increases. The NFTA plans to monitor many of the routes over the months following to find efficiencies in potential changes.

===== Bus rapid transit =====
In the January 24, 2013 edition of The Buffalo News, the NFTA was reported to be in the planning stages of adding what is essentially bus rapid transit to its route 5 Niagara-Kenmore corridor. Plans include transforming the corridor into an efficient limited-stop corridor that would remove a number of minutes from the time between the Downtown Buffalo area and the Riverside community near the city line. Some of the plans are said to include signal prioritization, modern electronic signage showing the time for the next due bus, creating a new transit center in Riverside that would connect a number of routes into one location, including a park-and-ride lot at the transit center and new natural-gas powered buses that would be used on the line. The success of this project would eventually open the doors to other key corridors being switched to bus rapid transit over time. In addition, the project aims to also improve the reliability and timeliness of the buses.

On December 6, 2015, NFTA Metro opened the Black Rock/Riverside Transit Hub in North Buffalo, resulting in a number of routing and schedule changes to several bus routes so that buses can take advantage of serving the new transportation hub. Years later, on December 22, 2023, the federal government awarded a $102 million grant the NFTA to design and construct a BRT line through Bailey Avenue in the East Side of Buffalo, as part of an effort to improve transportation and the quality of life in that part of the city.

=== Connecting services ===
==== Air ====
Although the NFTA has previously offered service into the region's airports, it has made further efforts to improve these services to passengers arriving and departing. The region's primary commercial airport, the Buffalo-Niagara International Airport, connects with NFTA-Metro services on route 24 Genesee, while the Niagara Falls International Airport serves a number of low-cost and charter airlines and is served by routes 55 Pine Avenue and 59 Niagara Falls Airport-NCCC.

==== Amtrak ====
The Buffalo-Niagara region has three Amtrak stations, two of which are located in Erie County and the third located in Niagara County. The Depew Station, located on Dick Road in the village of Depew, New York, is served weekdays only by route 46 Lancaster. Of all regional stations, this is the only station that serves the Lake Shore Limited train, to and from Chicago. The Exchange Street Station, located on Exchange Street, is a short walk from the Metro Rail and a number of other bus routes that serve Washington Street. A disadvantage of the station, however, is its limited hours, necessitating passengers to wait outside for arriving and departing trains. Of the three region's stations, this station is the only one to receive public transportation service daily. The Niagara Falls Station and Customhouse Interpretive Center, near the corner of Main Street and Depot Avenue West in Niagara Falls, is served weekdays and Saturdays only by route 50 Main-Niagara.

==== Inter-city bus ====
Most buses that service Downtown Buffalo operate within a couple of blocks from the Buffalo Metropolitan Transportation Center, located at the northeast corner of Ellicott and North Division Streets. The BMTC hosts bus services operated by Greyhound, Coach USA, Coach Canada, Megabus, various Trailways franchisees and Lakefront Lines. The BMTC also houses at one of its gates, the starting point of routes 40 Grand Island and 60 Niagara Falls buses, operated by the NFTA.

==== Local bus ====
Upon the elimination of service on route 201 serving Lockport, the NFTA made arrangements to advertise alternate service operated by Rural Niagara Transit within the city of Lockport. The replaced service, with lesser trips offered, served a similar service area and would allow residents of Lockport (off the route 44 Lockport) continued service. Rural Niagara Transit operates out of its primary hub at SUNY Niagara and spreads throughout the Niagara County area with connections between buses at the college three times daily. The service in Lockport is part of slightly modified service on the SUNY Niagara-Olcott and SUNY Niagara-Middleport routes.

=== Cash and passes ===
The NFTA operates on an "exact fare" system, in which passengers are responsible for having the exact fare ready or proof-of-payment upon boarding a Metro vehicle. Drivers and operators do not make change; however, vending machines are able to make change for customers in coins. Passengers can pay boarding fares on buses in coins, tokens or bills using Genfare "Odyssey" fareboxes, while passengers using the Metro Rail light rail line pay for their boarding fares using farecard vending machines located at each station. Rail ticket vending machines at one time were able to accept credit cards for fare payment, however, this practice was discontinued. There are presently seven fare categories. Previously, transfers were allowed between immediately connecting lines for a lesser charge than full-fare (with the exception being between bus and rail and vice versa). This practice was permanently discontinued on May 1, 2012, at which point passengers are required to pay a boarding fare upon each boarding or get a pass.

==== College cooperative agreements ====
In recent years, the NFTA has aggressively pursued agreements with many local colleges and universities, using their "NFTA Unlimited Access" program. Under the program, students are offered semester passes that allow the user unrestricted travel on any Metro regularly scheduled service. Erie Community College was at the forefront of this service and originally provided students a shuttle service linking the three campuses through the City Campus. Route 80 operated for approximately two calendar years, but service was eliminated and students were given the opportunity to use alternate service on local bus routes. Later, a Metrolink shuttle service operates on a similar plan, assigned route 211 ECC Circulator, but that route has since been eliminated and replaced with ECC's own tri-campus shuttle. Buffalo State University is another large college participating in the Unlimited Access program. At the start, the NFTA had operated three circulator routes, one (assigned route 206 Buffalo State University Circulator) primarily served the college grounds, in addition to two grocery stores near the college; Tops Friendly Markets at Grant Street and Amherst Street and Wegmans on Amherst Street and two additional routes (assigned routes 207 Elmwood Circulator and 208 Grant Circulator) circulating over the same route as Route 206, with service extended over Elmwood Avenue on route 207 and Grant Street on route 208. Due to route duplication on both the 20 Elmwood and 3 Grant bus routes, routes 207 and 208 were eliminated, while route 206 was eliminated as of September 2, 2018. Other colleges and universities that are presently included in the program are:

- Buffalo State University
- Canisius College
- Bryant and Stratton Business College

=== Metro Rail ===
Buffalo's first street railway began operations in 1832 with horse car routes on Pearl Street and Terrace operating to the Canada Ferry terminal. In 1860, the Buffalo Street Railway Company was established. Electric streetcars began operating in Buffalo in 1889 and the last horse car retired in 1894. In Niagara Falls, the first electric cars began in 1883, In 1902, the International Railway Company was created from the merger of the Buffalo's first street railway operator and Buffalo Street Railway Company. The trolley service ended in 1950 and would not resume until construction of the present LRT began in 1979, opening on May 20, 1985. As of February 18, 2013, there are 13 stations on the 6.4-mile (10.3-km) Metro Rail line, with five above-ground and eight underground.

==== Future plans ====
The Citizens Regional Transit Corporation (CRTC) has continuously lobbied local and state politicians to provide funding or support for extensions to the one-line system. A proposed Airport Corridor line follows the Division Street area, cutting through to the old New York Central Terminal around Jefferson Avenue, following old track bed through the CSX line between Walden and Broadway to Thruway Plaza, Walden Galleria Mall and Buffalo-Niagara International Airport. A proposed Tonawanda Corridor line follows the old Erie RR right-of-way (ROW) from LaSalle Station through to the Town and City of Tonawanda and the City of North Tonawanda. This line would have a number of branches: one operating through North Buffalo to Elmwood (known as the North Buffalo Branch) to Niagara Falls following the old New York Central Railroad's "Beeliner" service (known as the Niagara River Corridor) and to the North Campus of the university at Buffalo, using abandoned railroad right-of-ways (known as the Youngmann Branch). The extension to North Campus is currently undergoing a study by the local government, having secured funding in recent years. In addition, local officials are considering redeveloping the NFTA Rail Maintenance Yard into a multi-modal transportation center.

==== LRV fleet details ====
- Manufacturer: Tokyu Car Corporation, Japan
- Fleet size: 27 (one car {125} damaged in transit upon delivery in 1983, but has since been repaired)
- Fleet No.:: 101-127
- Length: 66 feet 10 inches (20,370 mm)
- Width: 8 feet 6.5 inches (2,604 mm)
- Weight: 35.5 tons
- Normal capacity: 140 (including 51 seated)
- Control: 4 chopper controlled Westinghouse motors (at 650 V DC)
- Track gauge: 1,435 mm (4 ft 8 1/2 in) (standard gauge)

===== Fleet refurbishment =====
Two rail cars (fleet numbers 114 and 123) were shipped to Dansville, NY in February 2010, where AnsaldoBreda Inc., a unit of AnsaldoBreda S.p.A. of Italy, has been making wholesale improvements to the cars, each receiving a top-to-bottom $1.5 million transformation and were returned to full revenue service on March 9, 2012, nearly two years behind schedule. In the nearly ten years since, 24 more cars (fleet numbers 101, 102, 103, 104, 105, 106, 108, 109, 110, 111, 112, 113, 115, 116, 117, 118, 119, 120, 121, 122, 124, 125, 126 and 127) were all refurbished and have since returned to full service as of February 1, 2022. Among the items being refurbished, passengers will experience new seating, stanchions, electronic signage and new audio systems, similar to the train service at Atlanta's Hartsfield-Jackson International Airport. Operation-wise, the shells of the car will be placed on refurbished trucks, with new wheels, gear boxes, overhauled traction motors, new pantographs, brakes and air compression systems.

=== Corporate identity ===
==== Coloring and print media ====
The current color scheme (navy, light-gray and gray) first appeared on the 2000 series (Nova Bus LFS) coaches in early 2000. The color scheme met with approval on most sides. According to a past Buffalo News article, the colors and logo were chosen to link the area's "water" image with the company. The force of the Niagara River and Niagara Falls contribute to the idea of the "wave" design that was chosen. With the arrival of the 6000 series GMC RTS-04 buses in 1984, the NFTA's Metro system operated its vehicles using a color scheme of yellow, orange and brown, referred to as "earth tone" or "candy corn." As of February 1, 2022, this color scheme can only be found on one Metro Rail car (fleet number 107), but it is expected that car 107 will eventually be painted in the newer livery during its mid-life overhaul being performed.

Prior to 1984, the Niagara Frontier Transit Metro System had painted their fleet with a yellow and black scheme (during the 1970s), similar to that of the Pittsburgh Steelers' football uniform colors, the Pittsburgh Penguins' hockey uniform colors and the Pittsburgh Pirates' baseball uniform colors and maintained the red and cream color scheme used by the Niagara Frontier Transit System (1950-1960s). The International Railway Company, the predecessor to the Niagara Frontier Transportation System used either an orange and cream or forest green and vermilion scheme for their vehicles. The NFTA used a circular logo during the 1970s for the parent corporation, showing a nested combination of a bus, airplane and ship. For the NFTA Metro system, a simple typeface, similar to blippo spelled out "metro bus." Towards the end of the 1990s, a modified "M" in the same typeface, except with a "swoosh" style to the left of the letter. In 2000, the NFTA replaced its logo type with a variation of "Helvetica" in the italicized version. This style is present on all NFTA correspondence, including the NFTA Metro Bus and Rail system, the Buffalo-Niagara International Airport, the Niagara Falls International Airport and the NFTA Small Boat Harbor, among others.

==== Slogans ====
- "Serving Buffalo Niagara"
- "Serving the Niagara Region"(past)
- "Let Metro Take You Where You Want to Go!" (past)
- "The System Works" (past)
- "You and I Go Places Together" (past)
- "We're Going Your Way!" (past)

=== Timeline ===
- April 1, 1974: The NFTA takeover of the Niagara Frontier Transit System, Inc. occurs.
- October 9, 1984: Metro Rail begins service in the Downtown Central Business District, between Auditorium and Theater Stations.
- May 18, 1985: Metro Rail officially opens for regular service between Auditorium and Amherst Street Stations. Due to construction issues at LaSalle Station, LaSalle and South Campus Stations officially open on November 10, 1986.
- April 1, 1990: The NFTA experiences a two-day shutdown due to budgeting and funding issues with state and local governments. Prior to this closure, the NFTA distributed "red" schedules for the first time, clearly giving passengers a preview of pending service cuts to the Metro System. The most severe plan had the closure of the Metro Rail line entirely, as well as all service eliminated after 7:00pm weekdays and no service offered on Saturdays, Sundays or major holidays. Due to this alarming preview and subsequent closure, emergency funding was established by elected Erie County officials and service resumed later in the day following (Monday, April 2, 1990) without cuts to service.
- March 24, 1993: The "New" Metro System is introduced, creating a streamlined version of the previous Metro system, increasing bus frequencies, adding a number of new routes and new destinations not previously served by bus. With this new service, a number of branches with low ridership are eliminated and the service was redirected to supplement the new service.
- December 14, 1995: 17-year-old Cynthia Wiggins is struck by a ten-ton dump truck while crossing a seven lane roadway (Walden Avenue) across from the Walden Galleria Mall. She dies of her injuries almost three weeks later, on January 2, 1996. Her death sparks a number of lawsuits against the NFTA, the Pyramid Corporation (the owner of the mall) and many others, charging racial discrimination due to the inability of the NFTA to have their buses enter the mall. This lawsuit is eventually settled, in which the Pyramid Corporation pays $2 million and the dump truck driver pays $250,000 to Cynthia's then-four-year-old son. Effective with the December 1997 schedule changes, all NFTA buses are finally allowed to enter the Walden Galleria Mall, Boulevard Mall, McKinley Mall and Eastern Hills Mall, previously not allowed by mall management.
- October 26, 1999: Longtime Metro Bus driver Gilbert Rogers is killed in an accident across Genesee Street at the Buffalo-Niagara International Airport. The bus Rogers was driving is reported to have collided with a tractor-trailer loaded with crushed stone shortly before 7:00 am. John R. Battle, the NFTA police chief at the time, was quoted as saying, "...it appears that the bus driver, who was turning into the airport, had the right-of-way and that the truck driver, who was traveling westbound (on Genesee) when the accident occurred, was unable to stop his vehicle at the intersection. There's a lot of momentum when you have a truck loaded with that much stone." Witnesses told police that the truck had already begun wobbling and losing some of its stones as it approached the intersection, which is controlled by a traffic light. The driver of the truck later pleaded guilty in March 2000 and was subsequently fined $1,100.00, but was spared jail time, as prosecution dismissed charges of unreasonable speed and an overweight vehicle due to the plea deal.
- September 1, 2003: Four NFTA Metro stations are permanently renamed: South Campus Station becomes University Station; Delavan-College Station becomes Delavan/Canisius College Station; Allen-Hospital Station becomes Allen/Medical Campus Station and Auditorium Station becomes Erie Canal Harbor Station.
- December 23, 2007: NFTA Metro introduces the newly built Niagara Falls Transportation Center in the Town of Niagara. This results in a number of routing and schedule changes to all Niagara Falls routes, so that buses can take advantage of serving the new transportation center. The building is the first new build of a transportation in more than 30 years by the NFTA. It is also built in the Town of Niagara, compared to Downtown Niagara Falls so that it is more central in Niagara County.
- May 25, 2008: NFTA Metro implements a new bus route (#210 Airport-Niagara Falls Express) between the Greater Buffalo-Niagara International Airport, the Niagara Transit Center and Downtown Niagara Falls. Created to coincide with the start of the peak tourist season in Niagara Falls, this trip takes 50 minutes from end-to-end.
- September 5, 2008: Reminiscent of the Cynthia Wiggins lawsuit of 1995, the NFTA is banned by the owners of the Quaker Crossing shopping complex in Orchard Park. Allegations of the ban being racially motivated were denied by the mall owners, who instead cited safety concerns for pedestrians walking in the plaza. In the interim, the NFTA began operating buses over Amanda and Amelia Lanes, roadways that bisect the plaza.
- October 31, 2010: NFTA-Metro embarks on a sweeping change to its service network, following a multi-year study by TMI, Inc. The resulting changes included dropping zone fare charges for a uniform boarding fare regardless of the distance traveled, either removing or reducing service from low patronized areas in favor of improving service during middays and weekends. Passengers experienced these changes during a time when it normally is not adjusted, due to the scope of the changes made.
- February 18, 2013: After 10,359 days of service, Theater Station permanently closes, reducing the number of free fare zone stations from six to the current five, with Fountain Plaza Station, located 546 feet south, now serving as the beginning (southbound) and ending (northbound) of the free fare zone.
- June 24, 2013 – October 14, 2013: NFTA-Metro begins phase two of the "Returning Cars to Main Street" project by single tracking along the 600 block of Main Street from the tunnel entrance to Chippewa Street, just north of where Fountain Plaza Station currently stands. From June 24, 2013 – August 8, 2013, the outbound track from Allen/Medical Campus Station to Church Station is used, as the inbound track is redone. During the weekend of August 8–10, 2013, Allen/Medical Campus temporarily serves as the southern terminus of the Metro Rail as construction shuts down above-ground service. As a result, NFTA-Metro offers shuttle buses to accommodate passengers between Allen/Medical Campus Station and Erie Canal Harbor Station, with each shuttle running every 15 minutes. From August 11, 2013 – October 14, 2013, the inbound track is used, as the outbound track is redone.
- March 30, 2014 – October 14, 2014: NFTA-Metro begins phase three of the "Returning Cars to Main Street" project by single tracking along the 500 block of Main Street from Chippewa Street to Mohawk Street, just north of where Lafayette Square Station currently stands. From March 30, 2014 – July 17, 2014, the inbound track from Allen/Medical Campus Station to Church Station is used, as the outbound track, along with Fountain Plaza Station's outbound platform, is redone. During the weekend of July 18–20, 2014, Allen/Medical Campus temporarily serves as the southern terminus of the Metro Rail as construction shuts down above-ground service. As a result, NFTA-Metro offers shuttle buses to accommodate passengers between Allen/Medical Campus Station and Erie Canal Harbor Station, with each shuttle running every 15 minutes. From July 21, 2014 – October 10, 2014, the outbound track is used, as the inbound track, along with Fountain Plaza Station's inbound platform, is redone.
- June 10, 2015: NFTA-Metro introduces its revamped customer care information line which includes a new "Smart Traveler Stop Lookup ID" option so that passengers can check exactly what time their bus (or train) gets to a certain stop.
- December 6, 2015: NFTA Metro introduces the newly built Black Rock/Riverside Transit Hub in North Buffalo. This results in a number of routing and schedule changes to several bus routes so that buses can take advantage of serving the new transportation hub.

== Properties Division (stations/garages/barns) ==
The NFTA Properties Division is charged with management of the facilities owned and operated in the NFTA organization. Properties include numerous bus loops and suburban transit centers, the Buffalo Metropolitan Transportation Center (MTC), the Niagara Falls Transportation Center in the Town of Niagara, a number of NFTA related office buildings and bus maintenance facilities (garages).

=== Active depots ===
All buses are stored at three maintenance facilities (terminals):

- Cold Spring Terminal (Main Street and Michigan Avenue, Buffalo, NY 14208)
- Frontier Terminal (Kenmore Avenue and Military Road, Kenmore, NY 14217)
- Gisel/Wolford Terminal (Babcock and William Streets, Buffalo, NY 14206)
- South Park Terminal (South Park Avenue and Main Street, Buffalo, NY 14203)

=== Former depots ===
- Broadway Barns (Broadway and Greene Street, Buffalo, NY 14212)
- Buffalo & 13th (Buffalo Avenue and 13th Street, Niagara Falls, NY 14303)
- Forest (Forest Avenue and Abbotsford Place, Buffalo, NY 14213)
- Hertel & Military (Military Road and Hertel Avenue, Buffalo, NY 14207)
- Main & Virginia (Main and Virginia Streets, Buffalo, NY 14202)
- Walden & Lathrop (Walden Avenue and Lathrop Street, Buffalo, NY 14211)

=== Transportation (Intermodal) centers ===
Most buses operating to the city centers operate to or near:

- Buffalo Metropolitan Transportation Center (MTC): 181 Ellicott Street, Buffalo, NY 14203 (built in 1977; also houses the NFTA's administration headquarters)
- Portage Road Transit Center (PRTC): 1124 Portage Road, Niagara Falls, NY 14303
- Niagara Falls Transportation Center (NFTC): 2250 Factory Outlet Boulevard, Niagara Falls, NY 14303 (opened December 23, 2007)

=== Suburban transit centers ===
In addition, a number of transit centers were created in suburban locations to allow passengers to transfer between other routes in a coordinated location. Suburban transit centers operate with more amenities than typical loops used on many city routes. Suburban transit centers tend to be located on properties like shopping centers, and include separate shelters for each stop, pay telephones, schedule information and possible restroom areas for drivers and agency employees.

- Appletree Business Park off Bennett Road on south end of property
- Athol Springs on Big Tree Road at NYS 5
- Southgate Plaza near Citibank
- Niagara Falls International Airport on Niagara Falls Boulevard
- Thruway Plaza off Harlem Road on west end of plaza property
- Tonawanda at the southwest corner of Niagara and Main Streets in the City of Tonawanda
- Victory near South Park Avenue at Ridge Road, Buffalo/Lackawanna border

=== Metro Rail stations ===
==== Stations with bus loops ====
- Utica, 1391 Main Street, Buffalo, NY 14209
- Delavan/Canisius College (formerly Delavan-College), 1863 Main Street, Buffalo, NY 14208
- LaSalle, 3030 Main Street, Buffalo, NY 14214
- University (formerly South Campus), 3383 Main Street, Buffalo, NY 14214

==== Stations without bus loops ====
- Erie Canal Harbor (formerly Auditorium), 100 block of Main Street, Buffalo, NY 14202
- Merchants Insurance @ Seneca (formerly Seneca), 200 block of Main Street, Buffalo, NY 14202
- Church, 300 block of Main Street, Buffalo, NY 14202
- Evans Bank @ Lafayette Square (formerly Lafayette Square), 400 block of Main Street, Buffalo, NY 14202
- Fountain Plaza (formerly Huron), 500 block of Main Street, Buffalo, NY 14202
- Allen-Medical Campus (formerly Allen-Hospital), 941 Main Street, Buffalo, NY 14202
- Summer-Best, 1147 Main Street, Buffalo, NY 14209
- Humboldt-Hospital, 2040 Main Street, Buffalo, NY 14208
- Amherst Street, 2666 Main Street, Buffalo, NY 14214

These stations utilize curbside bus boarding on surrounding streets.

=== Bus loops ===
Many loops serving as layover facilities for NFTA bus routes are properties that were originally created for the International Railway's streetcars to turn around in. The International Railway Company (IRC) was the primary predecessor to the Niagara Frontier Transit System (circa 1950) and ultimately, the NFTA (circa around 1972).

=== Active bus loops ===
- Andrews Loop northwest corner of Genesee Street and Andrews Avenue, Buffalo/Cheektowaga border
- Bailey/Abbott Loop northeast corner of Bailey Avenue and Abbott Road, Buffalo, NY 14220
- Black Rock/Riverside Loop southeast corner of Niagara Street and Ontario Street, Buffalo, NY 14207 (opening December 6, 2015)
- Wildwood Loop Seneca Street at Wildwood Place, Buffalo, NY 14210
- Ellicott Loop bounded by North Division, South Division, Ellicott and Oak Streets, Buffalo, NY 14203
- Fernwood Loop Clinton Street and Rossler Avenue, Buffalo, NY 14206
- Goethe Loop southeast corner of East Lovejoy Street and Goethe Street, Buffalo, NY 14206
- Huntley Loop Kensington Avenue near Huntley Avenue, Buffalo/Cheektowaga border
- Jersey Left on exit from Main Street at Bailey Avenue, Buffalo, NY 14214
- Michael Loop southeast corner of Broadway and Michael Avenue, Sloan, NY 14212
- Orchard Loop southeast corner of Delaware Avenue and Orchard Drive, Tonawanda, NY 14217
- Paramount Loop Colvin Boulevard and Paramount Parkway, Tonawanda, NY 14223
- Vulcan (Baxter) Loop northeast corner of Vulcan Street and Baxter Street, Buffalo, NY 14207

=== Former bus loops ===
- Blanche Loop southwest corner of Elmwood Avenue and Kenmore Avenue, Buffalo, NY 14207
- Coburg Loop southeast corner of Kenmore Avenue and Coburg Street, Buffalo, NY 14216
- Delmar Loop Oliver Street and Ward Road, North Tonawanda, NY 14150
- Ensminger Loop Ensminger Road, near Sheridan Parkside Drive, Tonawanda, NY 14217
- Greenwood Loop Abbott Road at Greenwood Avenue, Lackawanna/Blasdell border
- Highgate Loop southwest corner of Bailey Avenue at Highgate Avenue, Buffalo, NY 14215
- Irwin Loop at corner of Niagara Falls Boulevard and Irwin Place, Amherst, NY 14228
- Jefferson Loop Main Street and Jefferson Avenue, Buffalo, NY 14208
- Nason Loop southwest corner of South Park Avenue and Nason Parkway near Buffalo and Erie County Botanical Gardens, Buffalo/Lackawanna border
- Pacific Loop Hertel Avenue near Pacific Street, Buffalo, NY 14207
- Pine Hill Loop Genesee Street near Pine Ridge Road, Buffalo/Cheektowaga border
- Preston Loop East Delavan Avenue near Preston Road, Buffalo, NY 14215
- Robbins Loop on Porter Road at Robbins Drive, Niagara Falls, NY 14303
- Seabrook Loop on Kenmore Avenue at Vulcan Street, Buffalo, NY 14207
- Virgil Loop on Kenmore Avenue at Virgil Avenue, Buffalo, NY 14216
- Walden/Bailey Loop southwest corner of Walden Avenue and Bailey Avenue, Buffalo, NY 14211
- Windermere Loop southwest corner of Main Street and Kenmore Avenue, Buffalo, NY 14214

== Union representation ==
The NFTA recognizes and negotiates with a number of unions representing various employees of the NFTA. As of 2008, there are 13 different unions that negotiate contracts with the NFTA. The largest of these, the Amalgamated Transit Union, represents the drivers of the NFTA Metro division. Their branch is known as Amalgamated Transit Union, Local 1342. Another union, the International Longshoremen's Association, represents service and maintenance workers at the Buffalo Niagara International Airport, the Niagara Falls International Airport, Port of Buffalo, Buffalo Metropolitan Transportation Center, Operations Center in Buffalo, Facilities Maintenance Center, and the Niagara Falls Transportation Center. Their branch is known as the International Longshoremen's Association, Local 1949. The members of the NFTA Police force are represented by the NFTA Police Benevolent Association.

== See also ==
- Buffalo and Fort Erie Public Bridge Authority
- Capital District Transportation Authority - Capital District, New York
- Central New York Regional Transportation Authority - Syracuse, New York
- Citizens Regional Transit Corporation
- Metropolitan Transportation Authority - New York Metropolitan Area
- New York State Thruway Authority
- Niagara Falls Bridge Commission
- Niagara International Transportation Technology Coalition
- Rochester-Genesee Regional Transportation Authority - Rochester, New York
