= Shops at West Seneca =

The Shops at West Seneca
- Location: West Seneca, New York
- Coordinates: 42°49′55″N 78°47′9″W
- Opened: 1969
- Previous names: Seneca Mall
- Developer: Joseph Meyerhoff
- Owner: Scott Congel
- Num. of stores: 0 (60 as shopping center)
- Num. of anchor tenants: 1 (6 as shopping center)
- Floor area: 676,000 square feet (62,800 m^{2}) (Seneca Mall); 650,000 square feet (60,000 m^{2})
- Floors: 1

The Shops at West Seneca was a shopping mall south of Buffalo, New York, United States. Built in 1969 as an enclosed shopping mall called Seneca Mall, it is in the Town of West Seneca at the intersection of Ridge Road (Erie CR 137) and Slade Avenue (Erie CR 91) immediately east of the New York State Thruway (Interstate 90).

== History ==
The William Hengerer Company originally sought to develop a location on this site in the early 1960s. This eventually led to the development and opening of Seneca Mall in 1969 in direct competition to The Thruway Plaza. The mall at that time housed a large JCPenney store as well as local chain Sattler's.

Seneca Mall was the major mall in the southtowns of Buffalo from its opening in 1969 through the 1980s. In 1985, the McKinley Mall opened in Hamburg less than three miles (4.8 km) away. Seneca hung on until 1989 when the Walden Galleria opened in Cheektowaga. At that time, all of the mall anchors vacated as well as most of the specialty stores and restaurants. The mall remained open until 1994, finally becoming a haven for mall walkers with no retailers.

In 1994, the mall's owners, The Pyramid Company, elected to demolish the mall. The company, which also owns the Walden Galleria, elected to build a power center on the site once the mall and outlying buildings were demolished. The center was branded as a plaza called The Shops at West Seneca and its first tenant (Tops Markets) opened in May 1997 followed by Kmart in 2000. Although many elaborate plans were put forth by Pyramid, no other stores were built. The lack of development on the former mall site has been a topic of debate for Town of West Seneca officials, many of whom have cited the former mall lot as blight.

In 2019, Kmart would close their location at The Shops at West Seneca leaving Tops Friendly Markets as the only tenant.

== See also ==
- Walden Galleria
- The Summit
- Eastern Hills Mall
- Boulevard Mall
