= L. L. Berger =

Former high-end department store in Buffalo, NY, USA

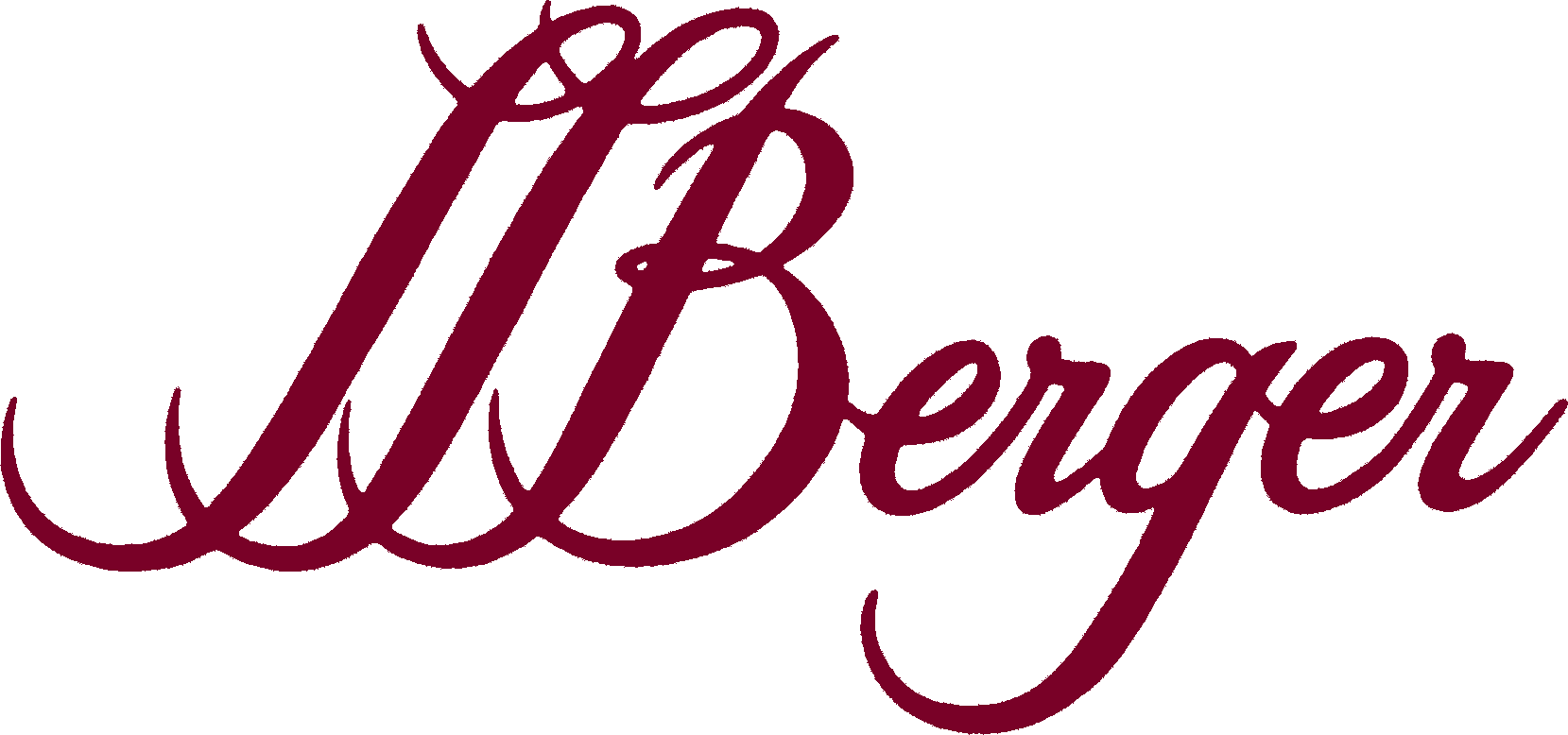
- Industry: Retail
- Founded: 1905
- Defunct: 1991
- Fate: Bankruptcy
- Headquarters: Buffalo, New York, United States
- Key people: Louis L. Berger, founder
- Products: Fashion apparel, shoes, accessories, and cosmetics.

L. L. Berger was a high-end department store based in Buffalo, New York. The family owned store was started by Louis L. Berger in 1905, at 500 Main Street. The company grew through the next two decades and opened its flagship store at 514 Main Street on February 4, 1929. The first suburban branch opened in 1953, at Thruway Plaza (later Thruway Mall) in Cheektowaga, New York, followed in 1960, with a location at Sheridan Plaza, in Tonawanda (Town), New York. At the death of its founder in 1967, the L. L. Berger company was "compared in fashion retailing to Saks Fifth Avenue and Lord and Taylor in New York, I. Magnin in San Francisco, and Neiman Marcus in Dallas." Expansion continued with stores opening in 1969, at the Seneca Mall, in West Seneca, New York and 1970, at the Northtown Plaza in Amherst, New York. Additional stores opened in 1975, at the Lockport Mall, in Lockport, New York; in 1982 at the Transitown Plaza in Clarence, New York; in 1988 at the McKinley Mall, in Hamburg, New York; and in 1989 at the Walden Galleria in Cheektowaga, New York. A second Buffalo location opened at 510 Elmwood Avenue in the early 1980s. The company filed Chapter 11 bankruptcy in 1991. In the early 2000s the flagship store was renovated to be upscale apartments and commercial space.
