= Flint & Kent =

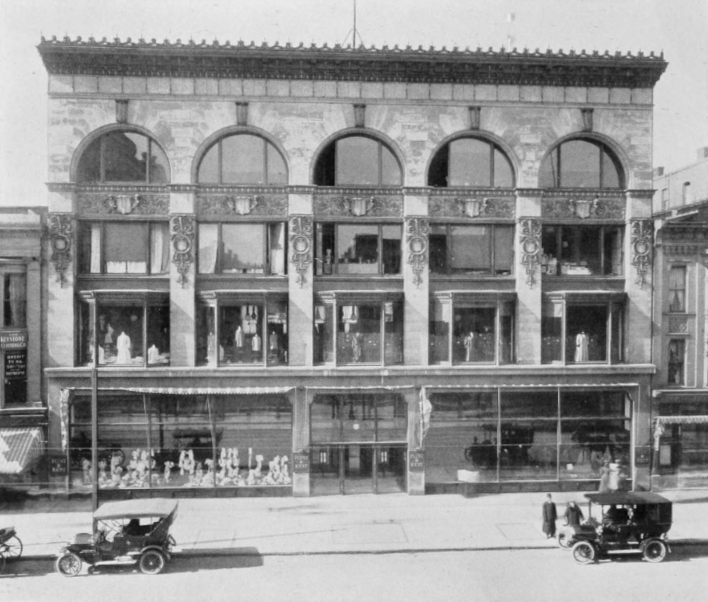
- c. 1908
- Industry: Retail
- Founded: 1832
- Defunct: 1956
- Fate: Sold to The Sample
- Headquarters: Buffalo, New York
- Products: Clothing

Flint & Kent was an upscale department store based in Buffalo, New York.

== History ==
It had its roots in a dry good store that opened in 1832 by Benjamin Fitch (1802–1883) at 288 Main Street, Buffalo. In 1836, the store was called Fitch, Marvin & Co., then Fitch & Marvin — the second name reflecting Fitch's partner, Eurotas Marvin (1810–1887)

On February 17, 1865, the owners — (i) Ethan Howe Howard (1812–1898), (ii) Joshua Mortimer Whitcomb (1821–1897), and (iii) William Bradford Flint (1826–1887), operating as co-partnership under the name Howard, Whitcomb & Co. — dissolved their partnership and sold their interest to a newly formed co-partnership of (a) William Bradford Flint, (b) Henry Mellen Kent (1823–1894), and (c) R.P. Stone, operating as a co-partnership under the name Flint, Kent & Stone. On October 25, 1866, Stone sold his interest to Henry Cogswell Howard (Ethan Howard's son; 1847–1913) and the firm henceforth was known as Flint, Kent & Howard. The eventually became known as Flint & Kent.

In 1856 William Bradford Flint (1826–1887) joined the company, followed by Henry Mellen Kent (né Henry Mellen Kent; 1823–1894) in 1865, the store became known as Flint, Kent & Stone – and eventually just Flint & Kent. In 1897, Flint & Kent moved its flagship store from 554 Main Street to a building that was designed by Edward Austin Kent, Henry Kent's son and noted Buffalo architect who died in 1912 as a passenger aboard the RMS Titanic.

=== Sale ===
In 1954, the company was sold to "Jack" Hahn (né Charles John Hahn, Jr.; 1927–2014), whose father owned Sattler's. The company was sold in 1956, to The Sample. Jack Hahn, a Buffalo native and 1949 alumnus of Princeton University, sold the company in 1956 to The Sample and went on to Harvard Law School, graduating in 1960.

== See also ==
- Sattler's
- The Sample
