= AM&A's =

Chain of department stores based in Buffalo, New York

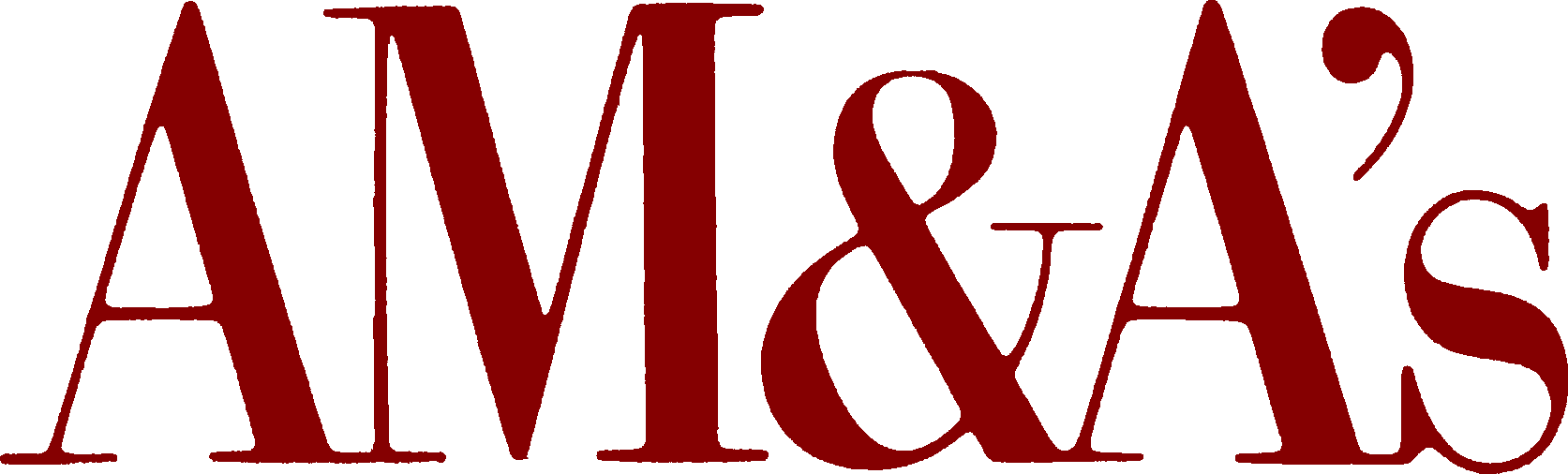
- Industry: Retail
- Founded: 1867
- Founder: Robert B. Adam, William Anderson, and William Meldrum
- Defunct: 1995; 31 years ago
- Fate: Purchased by The Bon-Ton
- Headquarters: Buffalo, New York
- Products: Clothing, footwear, bedding, furniture, jewelry, beauty products, and housewares.

Adam, Meldrum & Anderson Company (AM&A's) was a department store chain based in Buffalo, New York that operated from 1867 until its closure in 1995. Founded by Robert B. Adam, William Anderson, and William Meldrum, it became one of the city’s leading retailers, noted for its flagship Main Street store, elaborate holiday window displays, and the early adoption of electric power in the 1880s. At its peak, AM&A’s operated suburban branches across Western New York, ran its own bank, and maintained a large warehouse, before declining in the late 20th century and being acquired by The Bon-Ton in 1994, which retired the brand the following year.

== History ==
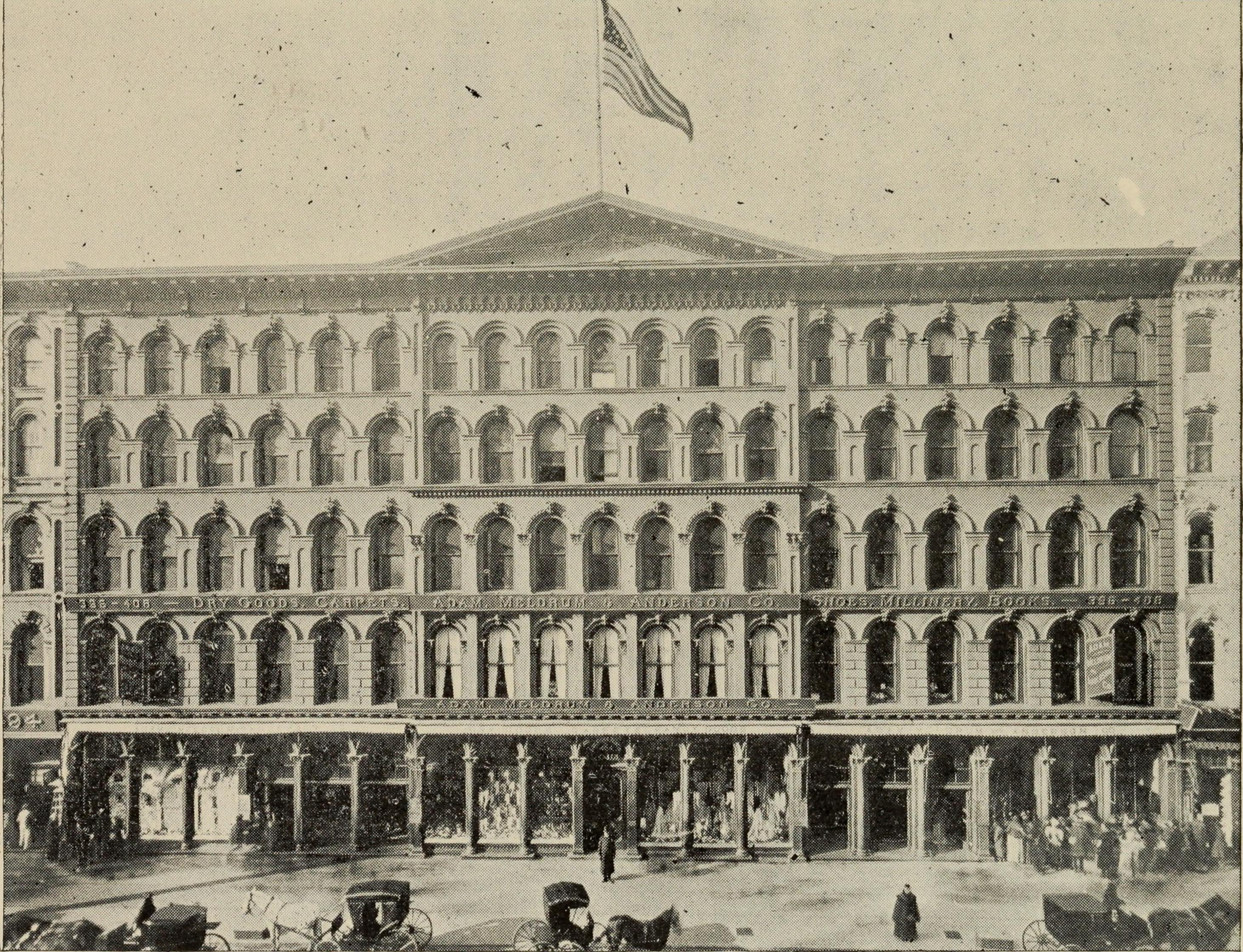
Adam, Meldrum & Anderson Co., Main Street, Buffalo, NY (1896)

The company was founded in 1867, as Adam, Meldrum & Whiting, at 308-310 Main Street. Co-founder Robert Borthwick Adam, was a brother of the founder of J. N. Adam & Co. In 1876, William Anderson joined the company after Whiting departed and it was renamed Adam, Meldrum & Anderson. In 1886, the company pioneered the use of electricity at a commercial enterprise in Buffalo with the installation of a Westinghouse generator. The company incorporated in 1892. In 1896, it joined the Syndicate Trading Company, a retail joint purchasing company based in New York City. From 1925 to 1956, it operated the Adam, Meldrum & Anderson State Bank, which merged with M&T Bank. In 1942, Robert Adam III, grandson of the founder, was president from 1942 to 1980; and then chief executive officer until his death in 1993. The chain was purchased by The Bon-Ton Stores Inc. in 1994.

== Flagship store ==
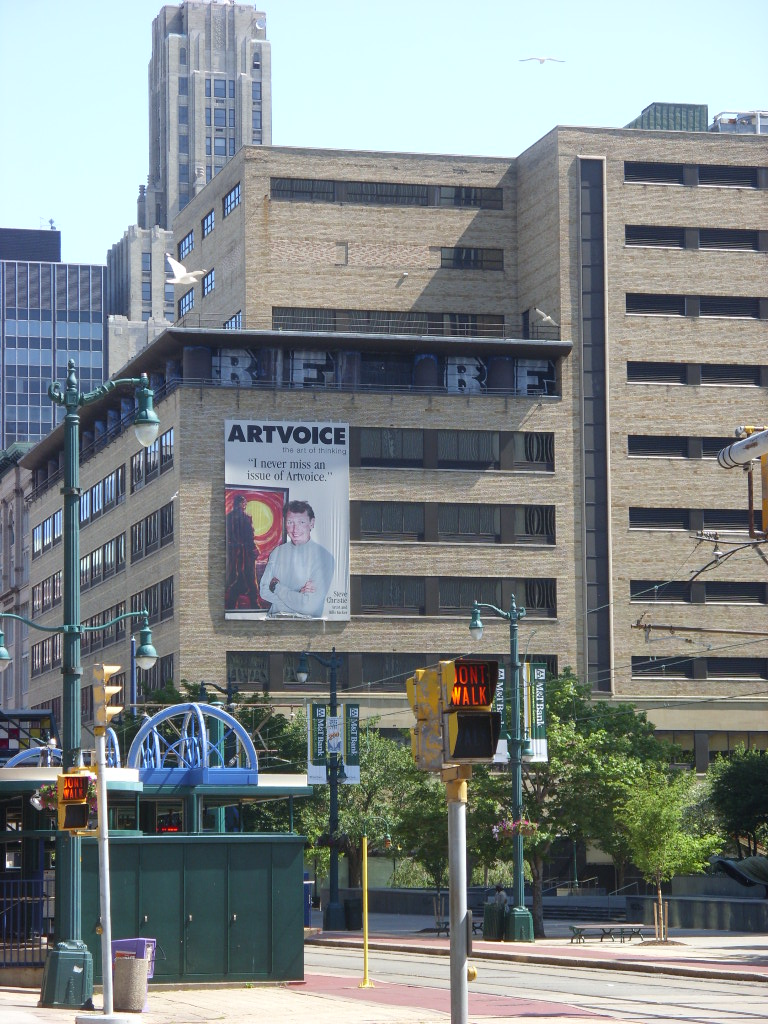
Former AM&As flagship store, June 2009

The original store was located on Main Street in the current site of the Main Place Mall. A $500,000 (c. $7.24 million in 2024) expansion of the store occurred in 1924, adding 70,000 square feet (6,500 m^{2}) to the original location. In 1932, the store expanded northward with the purchase of the Hudson's store at 410 Main Street. From the 1940s until its closing, the store was known locally for its elaborate Victorian Christmas windows. In August 1960, the chain moved its flagship across the street to 389 Main Street in the building formerly occupied by J. N. Adam & Co. After expanding warehouse space in adjacent buildings, a major remodeling of the store occurred in 1966; it was remodeled again a decade later. The store also had a restaurant, the Yankee Doodle Room, which operated from 1960 until 1993; then reopened for a short time as a gourmet market and deli. The flagship store operated as a Bon Ton until 1995. It reopened for eight months in 1998 as Taylor's, an upscale ladies department store. On February 20, 2009, the former flagship store complex was added to the National Register of Historic Places as the J.N. Adam-AM&A Historic District. In 2015, a New York City-based development group purchased the building with the intention of converting it into a 10 floor, 300-room, Asian-themed hotel and restaurant complex.

== Branch stores ==
AM&A's opened the first branch location of a downtown department store in 1948, when it opened a 5,000-square-foot (460 m^{2}) store at University Plaza. In 1950, they opened a branch at Sheridan Plaza in Tonawanda. In October 1952, they took over the former E. W. Edwards & Son location at L.B. Smith Plaza, later Abbott Road Plaza, in Lackawanna; it closed in 1971. In 1958, a store opened at Thruway Plaza, later Thruway Mall. That location would close in 1990, when the Walden Galleria location opened in a store originally constructed for B. Altman.

During the 1960s through 1980's, many major malls were erected throughout suburban Buffalo and AM&A's expanded to most of them. An 18,000-square-foot (1,700 m^{2}) store opened at Southgate Plaza in 1961, expanded to 100,000 square feet (9,300 m^{2}) in 1964. The Eastern Hills Mall location opened in 1972, Lockport Mall store in 1974, and Olean Center Mall in 1976. A store opened in 1979, as part of an expansion to the Summit Park Mall. After the closure of the local Hens & Kelly chain in 1982, AM&A's moved into its former location at Northtown Plaza. The McKinley Mall Location opened in 1985. All branch locations operating in 1994 became branches of The Bon Ton.

In addition to the retail locations, AM&A's operated a bedding and furniture warehouse in the former Pierce Arrow Automobile Manufacturing Facility on Elmwood Avenue at Great Arrow Street in Buffalo. Customer orders from the retail stores were sent to the warehouse where the items were pulled from stock and inspected for damages. Any scratches, dings, or dents in wood items were corrected by a team of two furniture refinishers. Orders were then set out for delivery to the customers home.
