= Jenns =

Jenns is a surname. Notable people with the surname include:

- Anne E. Jenns, British-born American plant pathologist
- Elizabeth Jenns (1911–1968), British actress

== See also ==
- Jenss
- Jens (disambiguation)
