= Twin Fair =

American discount department store chaing

Twin Fair Department Stores
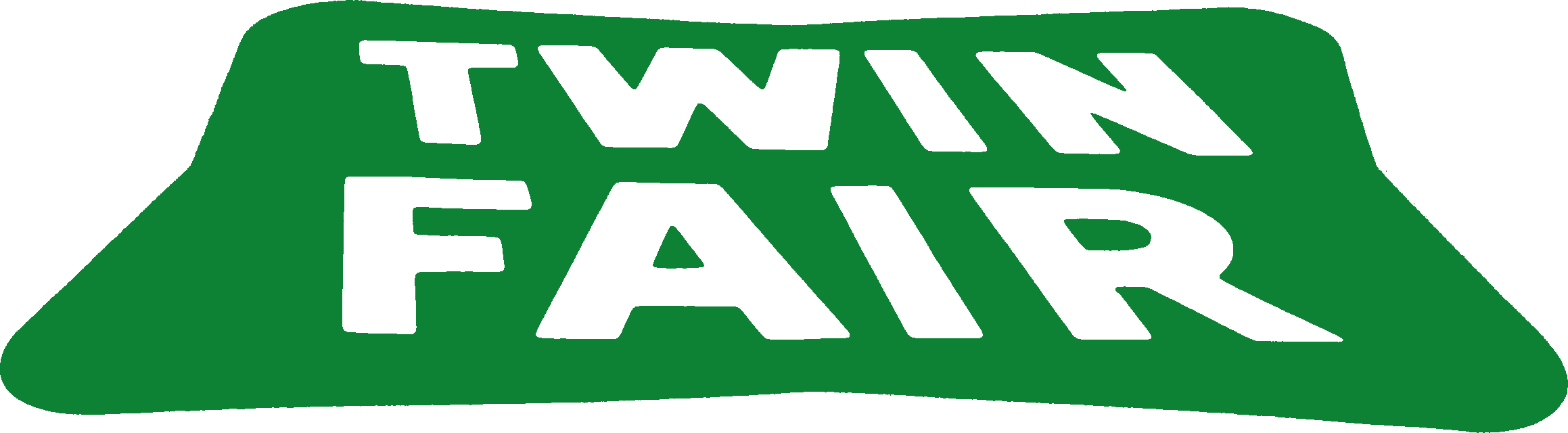
- Industry: Retail
- Founded: 1956
- Defunct: 1982
- Fate: Merged into Gold Circle
- Headquarters: Buffalo, New York
- Products: Clothing, footwear, bedding, furniture, jewelry, beauty products, electronics and housewares.

Twin Fair, Inc. was a discount department store chain based in Buffalo, New York. It was incorporated on March 22, 1956, and the first store opened on Walden Avenue. By 1959, four stores were in operation and sales stood at $2.5 million (~$21.1 million in 2025). In 1962, the founders sold the company to Unexcelled Chemicals, Corp., and also expanded the chain to include groceries. The company continued to expand opening an eighth store in 1967 on Seneca Street, along with stores in Connecticut and Cincinnati, Ohio. By 1970, through expansion and acquisition, the chain grew to 37 stores located primarily in New York and Ohio. The Ohio stores were later sold to Meijer, which briefly converted them to a concept called Meijer Square. In 1978, they added Hens & Kelly to their portfolio.

By the time of their 1982 acquisition by Federated Department Stores and subsequent merger into Gold Circle, the chain consisted of 14 stores in the western New York market. Many locations were later converted to Hills Department Stores.
