= Buffalo Metropolitan Transportation Center =

Intercity bus terminal in downtown Buffalo, New York, USA

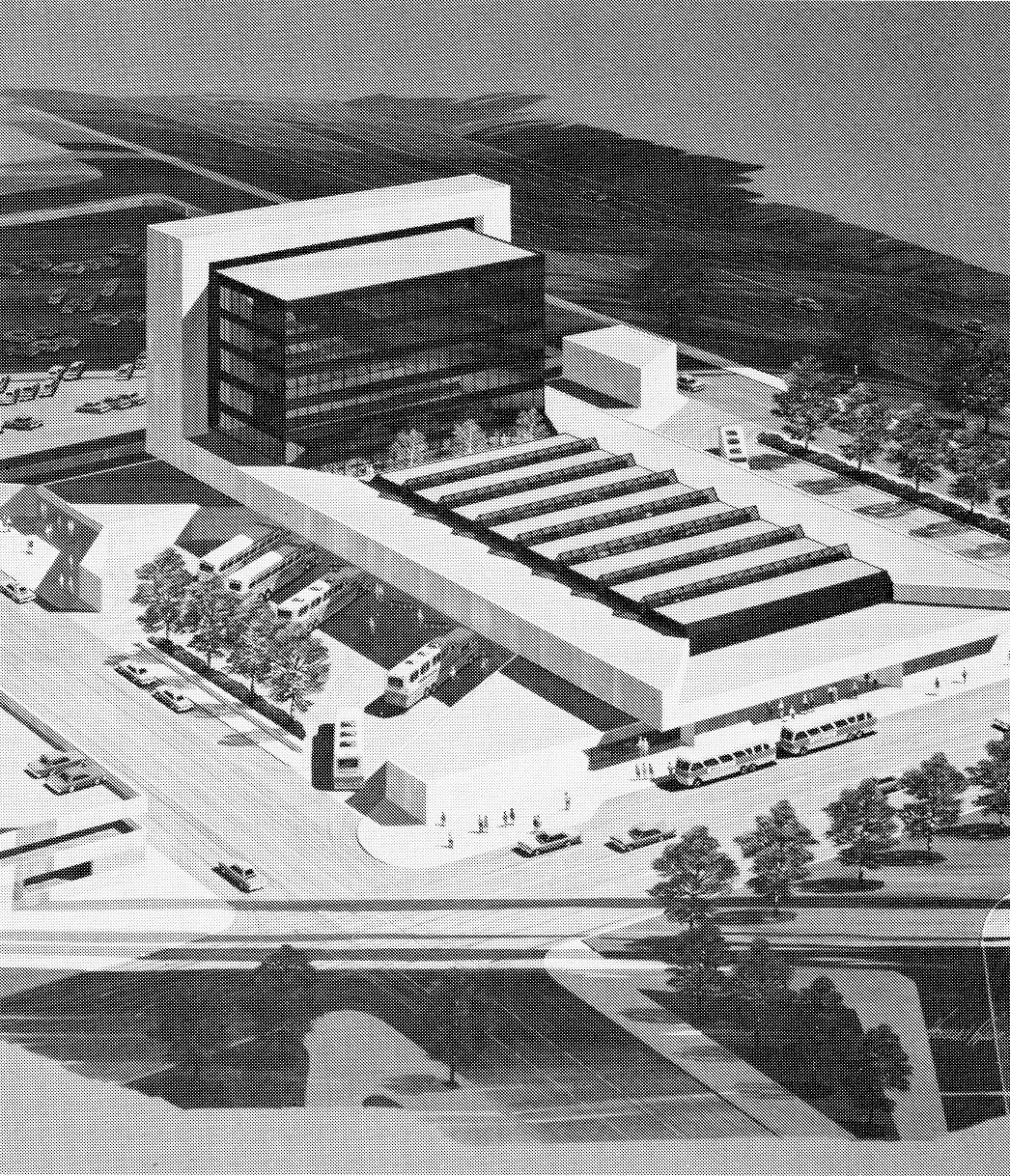
- Artist's rendering

General information
- Location: 181 Ellicott St. Buffalo, NY
- Coordinates: 42°53′00″N 78°52′19″W
- System: Bus Transportation Center
- Owner: NFTA
- Bus operators: NFTA Greyhound Lines; Megabus New York Trailways

Construction
- Structure type: Low rise bus terminal with an eight story office tower
- Cycle facilities: Yes
- Accessible: yes
- Architect: CannonDesign

History
- Opened: 1977
Location

The Buffalo Metropolitan Transportation Center is located on the southeast corner of North Division and Ellicott Streets in Downtown Buffalo, New York. The transportation center is open 24 hours daily.

Managed by the Niagara Frontier Transportation Authority (NFTA), which also uses the transit center as its headquarters, it operates as a major transportation hub for a number of NFTA Metro bus routes, as well as inter-city bus services. Its location is also of importance in that this terminal normally is the first or last stop in the United States on the busy Toronto-New York City bus corridor in the United States (the exceptions being a re-routed Buffalo to Toronto runs serving Buffalo Niagara International Airport on the way to the Rainbow Bridge, where it crosses into Ontario). The closest two Canadian bus stations (though not served by all trips) are Fort Erie (located at a Robomart gas station at 22 Princess Street, at Waterloo Street) or the more frequently served Niagara Falls Transit Terminal at Bridge and Erie Streets in downtown Niagara Falls, Ontario.

Built in 1977, the architectural firm of CannonDesign created a terminal that is a "pleasant and even exciting space to experience, with views of travelers, buses and the city beyond afforded by comparatively large areas of glazing". It replaced an older Greyhound Station, located at 672 Main Street, near Tupper. After the Main Street station had closed, it became a police station for the Buffalo Theater District, and is currently used partially as the Alleyway Theatre

== Inside the terminal ==
Aside from the transportation center being the main office for the Niagara Frontier Transportation Authority and the Buffalo area base office for Greyhound Lines, Inc., there are a number of service based businesses for passengers and employees of the terminal.

- In January 2025, the MTC Deli replaced the former Tim Hortons coffee shop.
- NFTA Transit Police sub-station
- soda and other vending machines
- taxi stand for Buffalo Taxi Service

In the past, Hardee's and Burger King had an outlet in the terminal that was later turned into a "Travelers Cafe", both operated by Greyhound Lines. The space for the restaurant also had been converted into an indoor waiting area for passengers waiting for local bus service at the corner of North Division and Ellicott. It has since been closed. The NFTA presently uses the area for storage.

Additionally, a gift shop existed for a number of years, but has been vacated and renovated into a larger office area for the NFTA Transit Police sub-station.

== Intercity bus lines serving the terminal ==
=== Greyhound Lines ===
- Buffalo to Batavia, Rochester, Geneva, Ithaca, Binghamton, Scranton, New York City
- Buffalo to Batavia, Rochester, Syracuse, Cortland, Binghamton, Scranton, New York City
- Buffalo to Batavia, Rochester, Syracuse, Utica, Schenectady, Albany, Springfield, Worcester, Boston
- Buffalo to Erie, Cleveland
- Buffalo to Toronto

=== Coach USA - Erie ===
- Buffalo to Lackawanna, Angola, Dunkirk, SUNY Fredonia, Fredonia (downtown), Cassadaga, Gerry, Jamestown
- Buffalo to East Aurora, Holland, Machias, Arcade, Franklinville, Olean

=== Megabus ===
- Buffalo to Toronto (non-stop only)
- Buffalo to Rochester, NY, Syracuse, NY, and New York City (semi-express)
- Buffalo to Philadelphia, Baltimore, and Washington, DC
- Buffalo to New York City, NY (non-stop)

=== Coach Canada-Trentway Wagar ===
- Buffalo to Fort Erie, Niagara Falls, St. Catharines, Grimsby, Toronto

=== Trailways of New York, Adirondack Trailways, Pine Hill Trailways ===
- Buffalo to Batavia, Rochester, Geneva, Ithaca, Binghamton, New York City
- Buffalo to Batavia, Rochester, Syracuse, Cortland, Binghamton, New York City

=== Fullington Trailways ===
- Buffalo to Springville, Olean, DuBois

=== Barons Bus Lines ===
- Buffalo to Dunkirk, Erie, Youngstown, Akron (OH), Wooster, Mansfield, Columbus and Cincinnati.

== Local bus routes directly serving the terminal ==
- Route 40 Niagara Falls at gate 14.
- Route 1 William at gate 17 or 18.
- Route 2 Clinton at gate 17 or 18.
- Route 4 Broadway at gate 19 or 20.

Board on Ellicott Street at North Division Street

- Route 6 Sycamore (outbound)
- Route 8 Main (outbound)
- Route 14 Abbott (inbound)
- Route 16 South Park (inbound)
- Route 24 Genesee (outbound)
- Route 36 Hamburg (inbound)

Board on North Division Street at Ellicott Street

- Route 3 Grant (outbound)
- Route 5 Niagara/Kenmore (outbound)
- Route 11 Colvin (outbound)
- Route 15 Seneca (inbound)
- Route 20 Elmwood(outbound)
- Route 25 Delaware (outbound)
- Route 60 Niagara Falls Express (outbound)
- Route 74 Boston Express (outbound)
- Route 76 Lotus Bay Express (outbound)
- Route 204 Buffalo Airport-Downtown Express (outbound)

Nearly all buses operating into Downtown Buffalo come within a short walk (maximum of three city blocks) of the transportation center.

== Future ==
In the later part of 1999, proposals were made for an updating of the terminal, including a new shopping area, restaurant, and updated passenger waiting area for NFTA Metro passengers, as well as intercity bus passengers.

The Buffalo News continued stories on this, as well as progress made on the possible creation of an intermodal transportation facility on the site of the Buffalo War Memorial Auditorium or at Buffalo Central Terminal, effectively linking Amtrak Trains with intercity buses, and local buses "under one roof" in a style similar to the William F. Walsh Regional Transportation Center partway across the state in Syracuse, New York.
