= Niagara Frontier Transit Buildings =

- Formerly listed on the U.S. National Register of Historic Places
- As seen in 1979

- Location within New York Location within the United States
- Location: 855 Main St., Buffalo, New York
- Area: less than one acre
- Built: c. 1881-1883
- Architectural style: Italianate
- NRHP reference No.: 80002609

Significant dates
- Added to NRHP: May 14, 1980
- Removed from NRHP: January 1, 1981

Niagara Frontier Transit Buildings, also known as the Buffalo East Side Railway Co. Horse and Car Barn, was a set of historic transit-related buildings located at Buffalo, Erie County, New York. They were built between about 1881 and 1883, and consisted of two interconnected Italianate style brick buildings. They were built by the Buffalo East Side Railway Company to stable its horse and horse-drawn streetcars. It later housed electric trolleys of the International Railway Company and buses of the Niagara Frontier Transportation Authority. The buildings have been demolished.

It was listed on the National Register of Historic Places in 1980 and delisted in 1981.
