= Niagara International Transportation Technology Coalition =

Niagara International Transportation Technology Coalition (NITTEC) is a road management system used in the Niagara Falls-Buffalo metropolitan area and Niagara Region of Ontario, involving the co-operation from both Canada and the United States.

Members include:

- Buffalo and Fort Erie Public Bridge Authority
- City of Buffalo
- City of Niagara Falls, New York
- City of Niagara Falls, Ontario
- Erie County
- Ministry of Transportation (Ontario)
- New York State Department of Transportation
- New York State Thruway Authority
- Niagara County
- Niagara Falls Bridge Commission
- Niagara Frontier Transportation Authority
- Niagara Parks Commission
- Niagara Region
- Town of Fort Erie

== Cameras ==
There are 59 cameras on the US Side and 9 on the Canadian side.

Roads with cameras include:

- I-190
- Kensington Expressway
- Scajaquada Expressway
- QEW
- Highway 58
- Highway 405
- Highway 406
- Rainbow Bridge
- Peace Bridge
- Queenston-Lewiston Bridge

Roads with signs are on the US side only:

- I-90
- I-190
- I-290
