= Hens and Kelly =

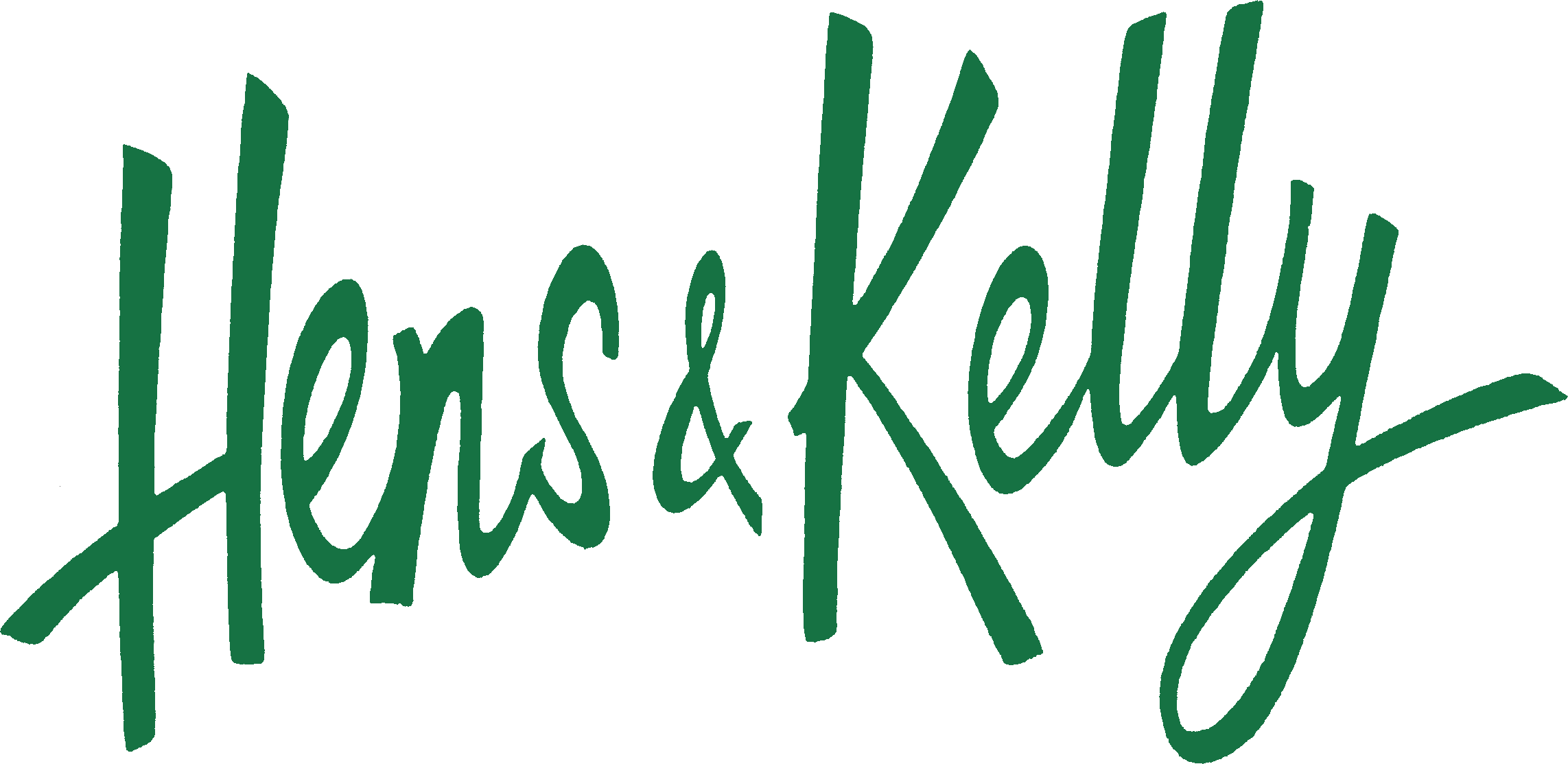
Hens & Kelly final logo

Hens and Kelly, established in 1892 by Mathias J. Hens and Patrick J. Kelly, was a chain of department stores based in Buffalo, New York. They were early adopters of S&H Green Stamps as a promotional incentive for repeat customers. The downtown store was located at 478 Main Street at the corner of Mohawk Street. The first branch location opened in December 1950, in South Buffalo at 2262 Seneca Street. It closed in 1959. Other stores followed in the L.B. Smith Plaza in Lackawanna, New York; 2863 Bailey Avenue, in Buffalo; and the Transitown Plaza, in Clarence, New York.

Hens and Kelly opened a $4 million (~$31.6 million in 2023) store at South Shore Plaza in Hamburg, New York in 1960, signaling a major expansion of the department store to the growing Buffalo suburbs. The following year a new store opened at Northtown Plaza in Amherst, New York. By the mid-1970s stores also operated at the Como Mall in Cheektowaga, New York, Village Shopping Center in East Aurora, New York, and Summit Park Mall, in Wheatfield, New York. In 1967, the chain was purchased by the Sperry & Hutchinson company and in 1978, by Twin Fair, Inc. Hens & Kelly was closed in 1982 when Twin Fair was acquired by Federated Department Stores.
