= Boulevard Mall =

Shopping center in Amherst, New York

- Location: Amherst, New York
- Coordinates: 42.987643°N 78.819952°W
- Opened: 1962
- Closed: February 3, 2026
- Owner: Douglas Jemal
- Num. of stores: 2 (80 at peak)
- Num. of anchor tenants: 4 (5 at peak)
- Floor area: 904,000 square feet (84,000 m^{2})
- Floors: 1 (3 in JCPenney, 2 in Macy's)
- Website: boulevard-mall.com

Boulevard Mall was a shopping mall located north of Buffalo at the western edge of the Town of Amherst in Erie County, New York, United States. The name came from its location on Niagara Falls Boulevard (U.S. Route 62), which divides Amherst from the Town of Tonawanda. Boulevard Mall featured a gross leasable area of 904,000 square feet (84,000 m²).

It opened in 1962 and closed permanently in 2026, but anchor stores JCPenney, and Gabe's, which all have exterior entrances, remain open as of June 2026.

The mall is set to be demolished and redeveloped as Boulevard Place, an urban boulevard concept with office and residential elements.

== History ==
The Boulevard Mall opened in 1962, and was the first enclosed shopping center in the Buffalo area. Since its opening, periphery retail surrounding the mall, primarily on Maple Road, Niagara Falls Boulevard, and Sheridan Drive has exploded. Because of its proximity to the Canadian border, Boulevard Mall was a frequent destination for Canadian shoppers. Anchored by a large, two-level, 220,000 square foot, Buffalo-based Sattler's and a two-level 80,000 square foot, Lockport-based Jenss, the mall opened with approximately 30 stores and became an immediate attraction to customers. In 1970, JCPenney opened a three-level 180,000 square foot store across from Jenss, and in 1978 the mall was extended on the south end adding approximately 30 more stores. In 1981, Sattlers was bought out by Sibley's of Rochester, who were, in turn, bought out by Pittsburgh based Kaufmann's in 1990. In 1994, the mall underwent a major overhaul as three restaurants, Bonefish Grill, TGI Fridays, and Honey's opened along with the construction of a 12 bay food court on the mall's east side which featured a carousel, a 1990s mall staple. During this makeover, the mall lured many upscale stores such as The Disney Store and Eddie Bauer. Following the opening of the Walden Galleria, seven miles to the south in Cheektowaga in 1989, Boulevard Mall underwent the overhaul to firmly establish itself as the number two mall in Western New York.

In 1997, the mall again underwent a redesign, this time cosmetically, which saw the implementation of modern skylights, marble floors, columns, and other features aimed at modernizing the complex. In 1998, after over 100 years in business, Jenss filed for bankruptcy and closed their store in the fall. The store was quickly converted into a Kaufmann's Men's Store. In 2000, the mall was expanded once again, this time adding a new wing connected to a two-level, 122,000 square foot Sears. Sears held its grand opening in the fall of 2000, marking the opening of WNY's fifth location. After Sears' opening in 2000, a large Abercrombie and Fitch store opened, as well as other up and coming national chains that wanted to get in on the action.

In September 2006, May Department Stores, owner of Kaufmann's, was purchased by Macy's Inc and all stores became Macy's locations, including the department store and the men's store at the mall. In 2013, H&M opened their second store in Western New York in the former Abercrombie and Fitch store. In 2014, after years of declining patronage and vacancies, it was announced that the food court would close and make way for a new Dick's Sporting Goods. The food court was razed the next year and the new, 58,000 square foot Dick's opened in October 2015. Food retailers were dispersed throughout the mall, such as Subway and Taste of China.

In 2016, following a poor showing during the holiday season, Sears announced it would close their store and auto center, as well as their store and auto center at the Walden Galleria. The stores closed in March 2017. In October 2017, Macy's abruptly closed their men's store in the former Jenss and moved the men's department to the main store. Following the departure of Sears and Macy's shrinking footprint, the mall entered a slow decline. Chains such as Charlotte Russe, Banana Republic, Hollister, The Children's Place, PacSun and others began to leave.

By 2019, after changing ownership, leases were no longer being renewed and many of the inline stores left for the massive development proposed at the mall. It was reported the Washington, D.C.–based Douglas Jemal purchased the mall and the nearby Wegmans for $30 million.

Following the outbreak of COVID-19 in 2020, the Boulevard Mall along with all malls in New York State were forced to close. This abrupt closure served as the death knell for many inline stores hanging on by a thread, and when the mall reopened in the summer of 2020, many did not return. Throughout the early 2020's many national chains that were still left continued the exodus, including Victoria's Secret and Pink, American Eagle, Hot Topic, Kay Jewelers, Express and ExpressMen, Zumiez, Lids, Bath & Body Works and others. Gabe's, a discount store, announced in 2022 that they would open a store in the former Sears building, however only the first floor would be used, and the store did not have an entrance into the mall. By 2023, the mall was rapidly approaching dead mall status, and after the holiday season, H&M announced they would be leaving the mall shortly after the new year. In April 2024, it was announced that the interior of the mall south of Macy's would be closed off to the public, with JCPenney, Macy's, Dick's Sporting Goods, Gabe's, and TGI Friday's remaining open as they have exterior entrances. The mall corridor from Macy's to JCPenney will remain open as Men's Warehouse and Loft still have stores on in the mall. The interior closed for good on February 3, 2026.

On January 8, 2026, Macy's announced that it would be closing as part of a plan to close 14 stores by the end of Q1 2026.

On February 3, 2026, the interior of the mall closed for demolition, following years of decline.

Jemal plans to redevelop the site as Boulevard Place, an urban boulevard concept with office and residential elements.

== Future ==
In 2020, the town of Amherst was seeking a $10 million grant to retro-fit the 60 year old property into an upscale development in anticipation of a future extension of the Buffalo Metro Rail to reach the University at Buffalo North Campus via Niagara Falls Boulevard and Maple Road.

In 2021, it was reported the Washington, D.C.–based Douglas Jemal closed on the purchase of the 63-acre site of the mall, and the adjacent Wegmans property for $30 million. Plans call for a property called Boulevard Place.

In 2024, JCPenney lost a second appeal to the town of Amherst to keep their store open in an eminent domain battle. As of now, the store remains open, but its future is unclear.

Late in 2025, The Amherst Town board voted to demolish the aging buildings to make way for redevelopment through Benderson Development. Supervisor-Elect Shawn Lavin stated the infrastructure is now in place for the property to become a blend of residential, commercial and mixed-use spaces. He added, "[...] you're going to see at that corner between both U.B. South and North Campus is something great, and today is the first step of that." Demolition is expected to begin in early 2026.
