= Sattler's =

Former department store chain in Buffalo, NY

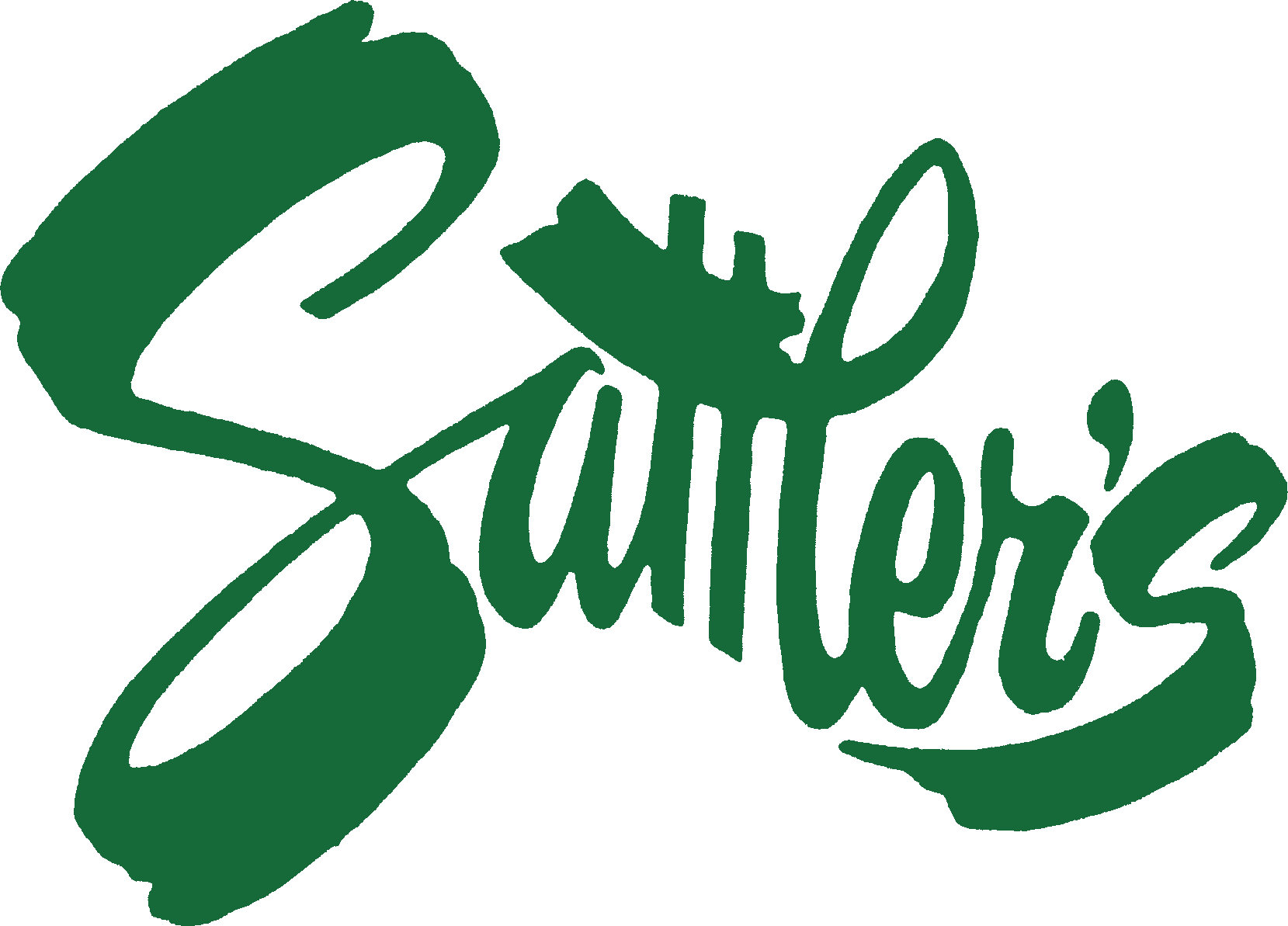
- Industry: Retail
- Founded: 1889
- Defunct: 1982
- Fate: Liquidated
- Headquarters: Buffalo, New York
- Products: Shoes, food, drugs, clothing, furniture, appliances, and housewares

Sattler's was a regional department store chain headquartered at 998 Broadway, Buffalo, New York, two miles (3 km) from the downtown core. They pioneered "bargain basement" retailing in the Buffalo area. Sattler's was founded in 1889 by 17-year-old John G. Sattler when he opened a one-room shoe store in his mother's home at 992 Broadway. That store would eventually become Sattler's main store which, by 1950, covered 6 acres (24,000 m^{2}) and included the 365,000-square-foot (33,900 m^{2}) flagship store. In the late-1920s the store introduced a number of innovative marketing and promotional schemes to attract customers such as weekly automobile giveaways and high wire walkers. They also resold the contents of bankrupt stores purchased in railcar lots called the "Bargain Train". Starting in 1947, they sponsored an annual Santa Claus parade.

Sattler's other Buffalo-area locations included stores in the Thruway Plaza (later Thruway Mall) in Cheektowaga, New York (1957), Boulevard Mall in Amherst, New York (1962), Seneca Mall in West Seneca, New York (1969), and Main Place Mall in downtown Buffalo (1973). In 1962–63, a store operated in Rochester, New York. In 1969, the company opened stores in Chautauqua, New York, and in Olean, New York.

In September 1965, Sattler's opened an innovative home furnishings and food merchandising concept store in an old industrial plant that covered 12 acres (49,000 m^{2}) at Elmwood and Hertel avenues in Buffalo. The $5 million, 500,000-square-foot (46,000 m^{2}) store operated as Sattler's Wonderful World of Food, Inc., and Home Furnishings City U.S.A. The store closed in 1979.

Starting in 1963, Sattler's also operated eight drug stores, including four free-standing units. These stores closed in 1979.

The Sattler's chain, then owned by United Department Stores, closed in 1982. The flagship store was razed in 1989, and replaced with a Kmart, which subsequently closed in 2003.
