= Jenss =

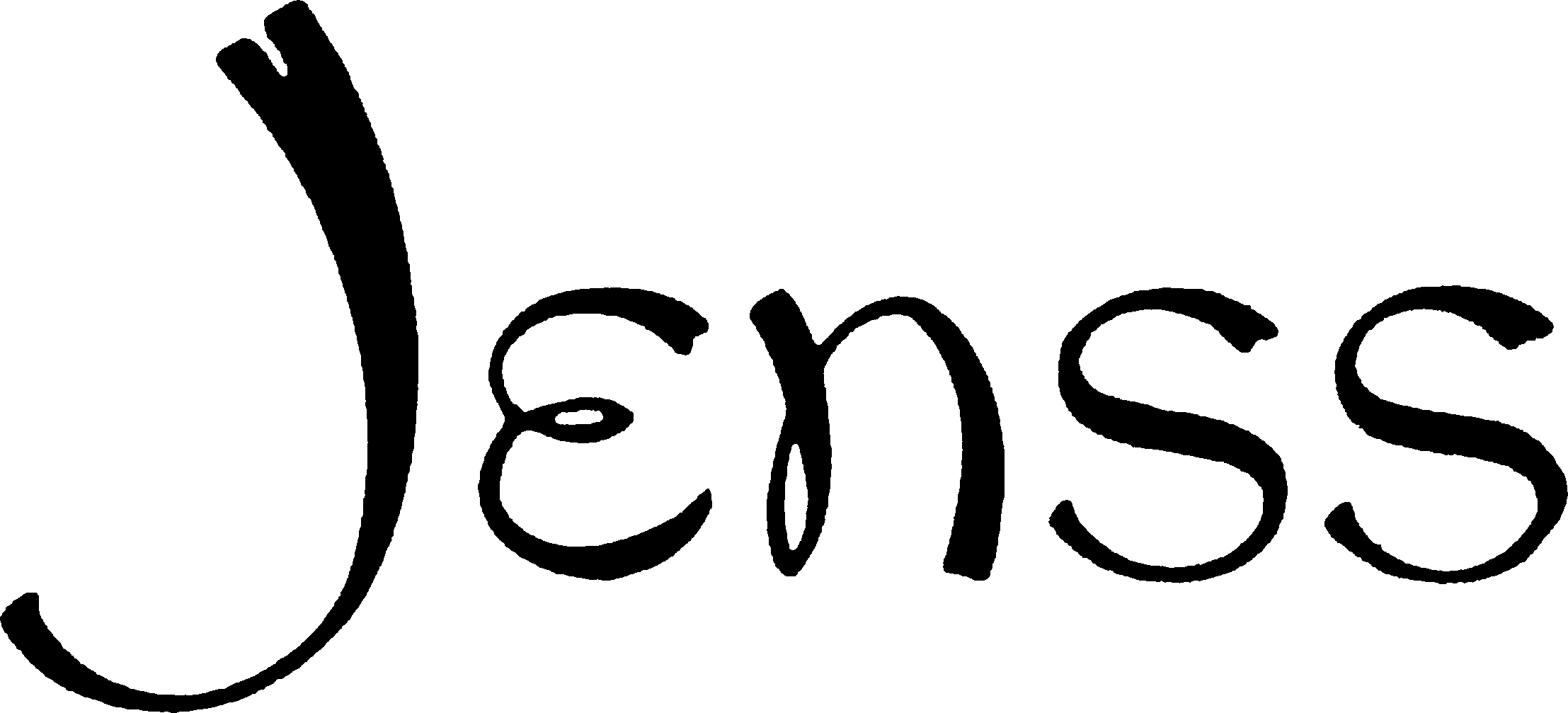
- Industry: Retail
- Founded: 1887
- Defunct: 2000 (closing of department stores)
- Fate: Closed Department Stores
- Headquarters: Buffalo, New York
- Products: Clothing, gifts, fine jewelry, and accessories

Jenss was a small chain of department stores in Western New York State. The company was founded in 1887 by the Jenss brothers in Lockport, New York. In 1951, Harold Dautch bought the company. In 1962, the company opened its flagship department store at the Boulevard Mall in Amherst, New York. Other locations were: Summit Park Mall, Eastern Hills Mall, and Main Street in Niagara Falls. It also operated the Jenss Twin Ton location at Main and Niagara streets in downtown Tonawanda (city), New York, the former Zuckmaier Brothers department store. In 1997, the company decided to close its Summit Park Mall Location. On September 15, 2000, Jenss closed all of its department stores. In 2002, Jenss, while remaining a separate company, chose to open stores exclusively with Reeds Jewelers. No merger took place, and the companies retain separate and distinct operations.
