= Eastern Hills Mall =

Shopping mall in Clarence, New York

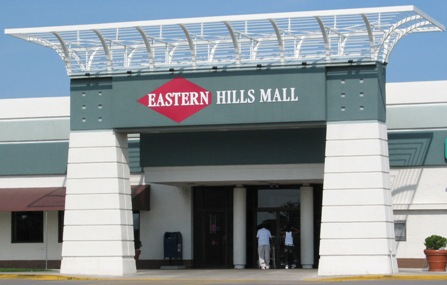
- Location: Harris Hill, New York, United States
- Coordinates: 42.972°N 78.693°W
- Opened: 1971
- Closed: 2024 (interior)
- Developer: Edward J. DeBartolo Corporation
- Manager: Mountain Development Corp.
- Owner: Mountain Development Corp., Uniland Development
- Num. of stores: 55
- Num. of anchor tenants: 4
- Floor area: 996,729 square feet (92,599 m^{2})
- Floors: 1
- Website: shopeasternhills.com

Eastern Hills Mall is a shopping mall located 11 miles northeast of Buffalo, New York, United States, on the western border of the Town of Clarence in Erie County. It lies on Transit Road (New York State Route 78). The mall is north of the junction of NY-78 with NY-5, and Main Street. The name "Eastern Hills" refers to the very low hills that contribute to a slightly higher elevation than the bordering areas along the Onondaga Escarpment. Eastern Hills Mall is part of a long commercial strip on Transit Road. Currently the mall is anchored by JCPenney, Raymour & Flanigan, and Orvis.

It consists of two long wings running north and south and one short wing running east and west, which connects the north–south wings in a "double L-shaped" formation. A major department store is at the end of each wing. A food court is located adjacent to the end of the long south wing but is currently closed and barricaded off.

== History ==
The Eastern Hills Mall was developed by the Edward J. DeBartolo Corporation. The mall was originally to be named "Buffalo Mall", but the name was changed to Eastern Hills Mall at the request of the town of Clarence. Construction began in 1969. The mall was opened on November 8, 1971. The original anchors were AM&A's, JCPenney, Sears, Jenss, Woolworth and Hengerer's. General Cinema opened the Eastern Hills Cinema I-II about six months later on May 24, 1972. Hengerer's became Sibley's in 1981.

The mall underwent an extensive overhaul in 1987 that added a food court. The only other expansion the mall sought was a Lechmere store next to JCPenney, but never opened. Originally the largest mall in the Buffalo, NY area, the mall lost that title to the Walden Galleria in 1989. Sibley's became Kaufmann's in 1990. AM&A's became The Bon-Ton in 1994. In 1997, Jenss closed. In 1998, Burlington Coat Factory moved into the former Jenss location.

Another renovation to the small east–west center concourse and food court took place in 2005, largely cosmetic in nature. New floor tile was installed in both the center concourse and food court, and imitation fireplaces, small flat screen televisions, and new seating were installed. The longer north–south concourses remained untouched during this second renovation, causing a break in a pink zig-zag floor tile line pattern, which prior to the 2005 renovation existed through the entire mall from end-to-end. In late 2006, Federated Department Stores converted all local Kaufmann's stores to Macy's. By this time, the mall featured many younger national chains. Television station WBBZ-TV established its broadcast studios at the mall in 2012.

In April 2016, Macy's announced they would close their anchor store, which was converted to Niagara Emporium. In April 2018, The Bon-Ton chain went out of business and closed its anchor store, which became Raymour & Flanigan. In December 2018, Sears announced they would close their anchor store. In October 2023, The Niagara Emporium closed.

Uniland's current plans for the mall include an enhanced development with residential apartments creating a mixed-use development dubbed a "lifestyle shopping center".

On January 10, 2024, all interior mall tenants without an exterior exit were given eviction notices and ordered to leave the mall by January 14, 2024. Partial demolition will begin on the mall as part of a plan for a new mixed-use campus development, which will include office, residential, medical, shopping, dining, recreational and civic areas.

== Non-commercial activity ==
After the October Storm of 2006, which devastated much of the surrounding area, the parking lot of Eastern Hills served as a focal point for clean up and restoration of services. Many utility companies used the parking lot as a ramada for parking vehicles at night and a dispatch point by day. In addition, part of the lot was used for storing materials used to restore power to the area.

== Future ==
In March 2018, Uniland Development, a local commercial development company, agreed to purchase a stake in the mall's equity, sharing co-ownership with current owners Mountain Development Corporation. Uniland's future plans for the mall are to convert some of the property to residential apartments and create a mixed-use development that it dubbed a "lifestyle shopping center." The Clarence Town Board approved plans for the mall in August 2018.

Uniland and Mountain Development attained the services of Gensler in January 2019. Similar projects they have worked include upscale shopping centers The Domain, Legacy West, and River Oaks Shopping Center. The first updates were unveiled in March 2020. A proposal was filed with Clarence town officials in June 2021.

It was announced in June 2025, the Clarence Town Board gave the green light to a major redevelopment plan for the Eastern Hills Mall. The project would redevelop more than one million square feet of space inside the mall and create 1,400 residential units. Along with housing, the future eastern hills town center would feature storefronts, restaurants, entertainment, and offices.
