= The Summit (New York) =

Former shopping mall outside Niagara Falls, New York

Coordinates: 43.088°N 78.938°W

- Location: Wheatfield, New York
- Opened: August 21, 1972; 54 years ago
- Closed: 2009 (whole mall); September 2017 (Save-A-Lot); August 2018 (last 2 anchor stores)
- Developer: Forest City Enterprises
- Owner: Zoran Cocov
- Num. of stores: 4 (98 at peak)
- Num. of anchor tenants: 5 (all vacant)
- Floor area: 800,000 square feet (74,322.4 m^{2})
- Floors: 1
- Website: www.niseevents.com

The Summit, formerly Summit Park Mall, was an enclosed shopping mall in Wheatfield, New York. Opened in 1972, the mall became largely vacant by the late 1990s. It underwent renovations in 2004 and 2005 which added new anchor stores and tenants, but after the mall's developers filed for bankruptcy protection in 2009, the complex was closed except for three anchor stores: Sears, The Bon-Ton and Save-A-Lot, with two more vacant anchors last occupied by Steve & Barry's and a Macy's closeout store. As of September 2017, Save-A-Lot has closed permanently, leaving only Sears and The Bon-Ton still open in the mall.

The Summit was located on Williams Road, south of US 62 (Niagara Falls Boulevard) and north of NY 265 and NY 384 (River Road).

== History ==
The original anchor stores of Summit Park Mall were Sears and three local department stores: AM&A's (bought out by The Bon-Ton in 1995), Hens & Kelly, and Jenss, with other major tenants including Child World and McCrory. Hens & Kelly moved out in 1982, and remained vacant until October 1992, when Macy's opened its first closeout store in the space.

Also in 1992, Child World closed its store, which was converted to a Toys "R" Us by year's end. The Macy's closeout store closed in 1995 and was never replaced by another anchor. By the late 1990s, the mall was 40% vacant, and its owners had expressed interest in converting portions of it to office space. Jenss closed in 1998.

In 2004, a local developer purchased the mall for $5 million, with plans to rename the complex Destination Niagara USA. At that point, the mall was 65% vacant. The mall was then renamed The Summit, and new tenants were added, including a Steve & Barry's, which opened in 2005 in the former Jenss space, a children's play center in the former McCrory and the Niagara Aerospace Museum, although this institution later moved to the former Niagara Falls International Airport's old terminal on Niagara Falls Boulevard. The mall's sales increased by 18% in 2007.

Toys "R" Us closed its store in early 2006 as part of the chain's reorganization plan. Two years later, a Save-A-Lot grocery store opened in half of the Toys "R" Us building. Steve & Barry's closed in 2008.

In May 2009, the mall's owners, Oberlin Plaza One, announced that the mall would close on June 6 following the company's filing for bankruptcy protection. At the time, twenty-five stores operated within the mall. The mall was allowed to stay open beyond this date after the U.S. Bankruptcy Court decided to extend the deadline for closure, although many of the twenty-five remaining tenants relocated. By August 2009, the mall's last three inline tenants moved out, leaving only Sears, The Bon-Ton and Save-A-Lot operational until its closure.

In January 2013, the mall building was flooded with up to six inches of water from a pipe, in what was believed by Niagara County police to be an act of vandalism. In March 2014 Zoran Cocov purchased the mall for 4.2 million dollars. Cocov revealed plans in late 2014 to revive the space adding stores, museums, a sportsplex, wine tasting center, and a business incubator. Cocov also received tax breaks for 700,000 dollars for five years for renovations to revive the space.

In 2016, it was announced that a brewery project was to be added to the current mall project.

In 2018 both the Sears and Bon-Ton anchor locations at the mall began liquidation sales due to declining sales locally and nationally. On April 18, 2018, it was announced that The Bon-Ton would be closing in August 2018 as it is going out of business, leaving Sears as the only tenant left. On May 7, 2018, Sears announced that would also be closing in August 2018.

In December 2019, within Sears' old location, The Niagara International Sports & Entertainment facility opened. In 2020, a plan was proposed to revitalize the location, converting part of the mall into mixed use spaces, as well as offering lodging for visitors. Developers plan to expand the project to eventually include ice rinks, shops, and eateries.

The Niagara International Sports and Entertainment Center project was estimated to finish by the fourth quarter of 2018. However, recent site revision complications have delayed some of these plans.
