= Walden Galleria =

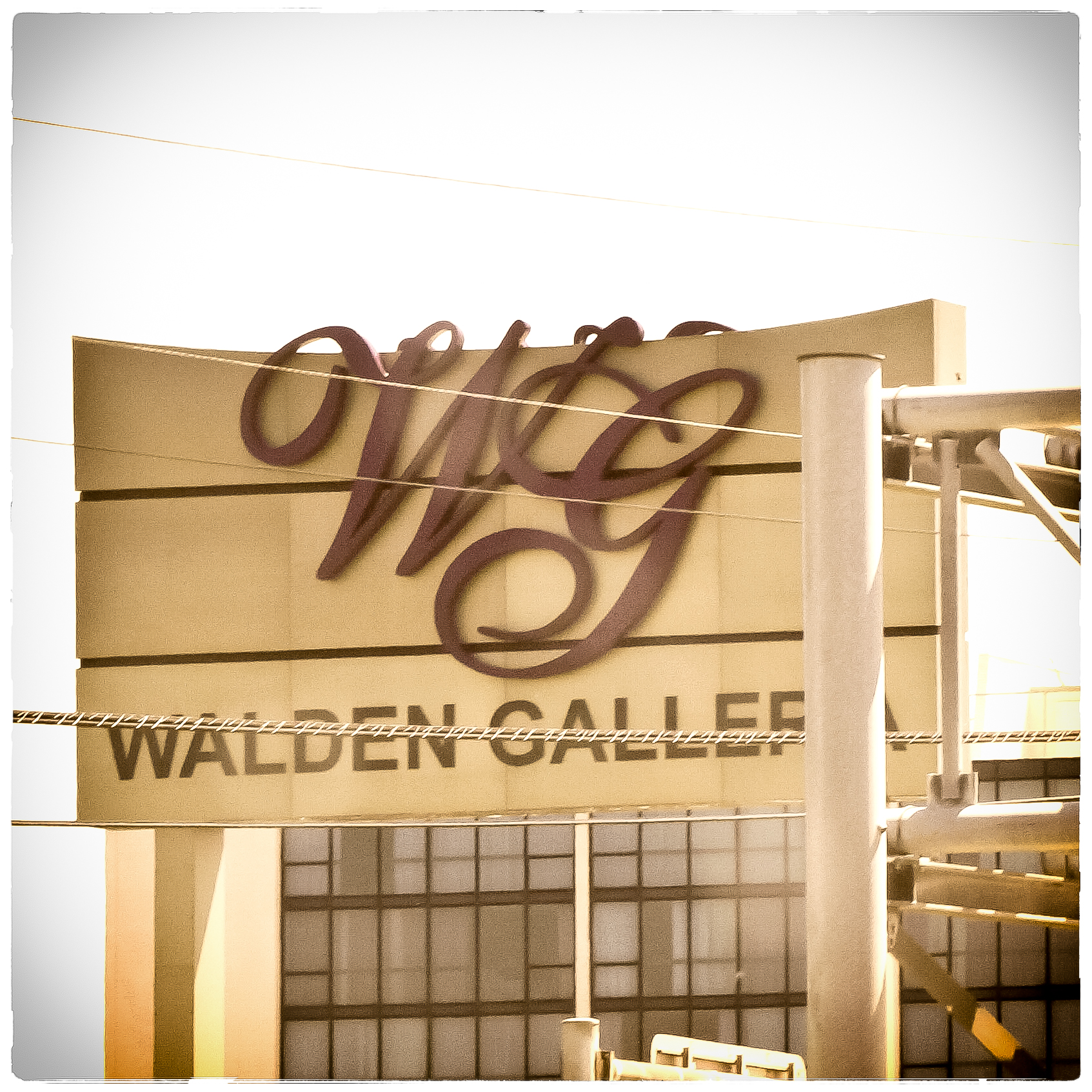
- Location: Cheektowaga, New York, U.S.
- Coordinates: 42.914126°N 78.763953°W
- Opened: May 1, 1989; 37 years ago
- Developer: The Pyramid Companies
- Manager: Pyramid Management Group
- Owner: Pyramid Management Group
- Num. of stores: 170
- Num. of anchor tenants: 9 (8 open, 1 vacant)
- Floor area: 1,600,000 square feet (150,000 m^{2})
- Floors: 2
- Website: www.waldengalleria.com

Walden Galleria is a super-regional shopping mall located in Cheektowaga, a suburb of Buffalo, New York, located east of Interstate 90 and New York State Thruway exit 52 off Walden Avenue. The Walden Galleria comprises more than 1,600,000 square feet (150,000 m^{2}) of retail space, with 170 stores on two levels, including a food court and a movie theater. The mall has stores such as Primark and Zara, that are unique to Upstate NY, with closest locations being in New York City and Toronto. In 2021, it was listed among the top 20 most visited shopping centers in America, attracting over 23 million visitors from the US and Canada. The mall is owned and managed by The Pyramid Companies of Syracuse, New York, the same management firm which developed it. The mall features Macy's, JCPenney, Primark, Dick's Sporting Goods, Best Buy, IKEA, in addition to a 16-screen Regal Cinemas which also features 4DX.

== History ==
Walden Galleria was developed by The Pyramid Companies, an Upstate New York-based shopping center development and management firm. Built on a site near exit 52 of the New York State Thruway, the mall was opened in 1989. The mall featured a range of upscale and traditional anchors, Bonwit Teller, L.L.Berger, The Sample, AM&A's, Sibley's, JCPenney, and Sears. At the time, the mall featured more than 150 stores, as well as a theater owned by Hoyts Cinemas.

An additional anchor space was built for Lord & Taylor in 1990.

=== 1990s ===
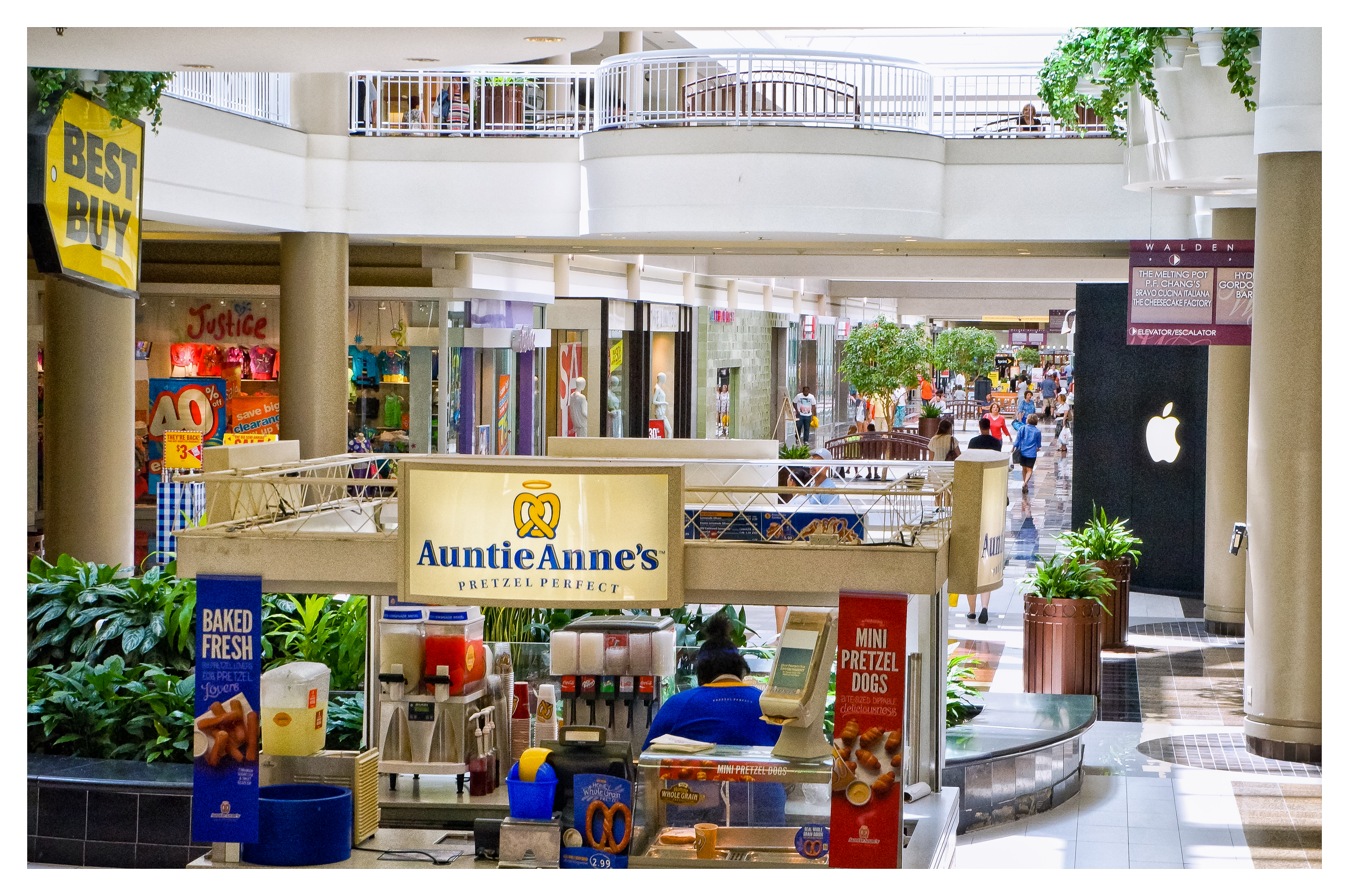
Walden Galleria Concourse

During 1990, storied regional division Sibley's became Pittsburgh, Pennsylvania-based Kaufmann's. In 1995, York, Pennsylvania-based department store chain The Bon-Ton acquired the AM&A's chain, converting all branches to The Bon-Ton. Later that year, on December 14, 17-year-old Cynthia Wiggins of Buffalo was struck by a dump truck while trying to get to her first day of work in the mall's food court from a NFTA Metro bus stop on Walden Avenue. The incident sparked allegations from Buffalo's African-American community that Pyramid did not want people from Buffalo's predominantly minority East Side to have easy access to the mall. In settling a wrongful death claim against Walden Galleria and NFTA Metro and to prevent a boycott of the mall, the bus stop was soon moved to a point inside the mall, where it remains today.

In 1996, sporting apparel retailer Finish Line opened one of its largest stores. Montgomery Ward, which acquired the Lechmere chain in 1994, closed the Lechmere stores nationwide in 1998, as part of a corporate restructuring. After its closure, Lechmere converted to JCPenney Home and a DSW Shoe Warehouse. In 1999, Kaufmann's also opened a home store within the mall.

=== 2000s ===
Dick's Sporting Goods at Walden Galleria, formerly a Galyan's sporting goods store

Upstate NY's first Apple Store opened, occupying 7,200 square feet (670 square meters) in front of the Bon Ton and Forever 21. Also joining the mall was Abercrombie & Fitch and Hollister, the latter of which was the first location in Western New York.

By 2002, General Cinemas had sold the mall's theater complex to AMC Theatres. In 2004, the Galyan's location was rebranded to Dick's Sporting Goods following the latter's acquisition of the former. In 2006, The Bon-Ton closed its store at the mall. In September 2006, Kaufmann's was rebranded to Macy's after Macy's merged with the parent company of Kaufmann's.

==== 2007 Expansion ====
Plans were announced to expand Walden Galleria by razing the recently shuttered The Bon-Ton to make way for a wing for additional stores, anchored by a 16-screen Regal Cinemas multiplex on the upper level. An existing exterior entrance with escalators and an elevator going up to the food court was removed and the large exterior glass wall was temporarily blocked off with the intention of creating a Barnes and Noble store in front of that space that would open up to the food court. However, that location became Dave and Buster's instead due to complications in the construction of Barnes and Noble's proposed escalators since that particular section of the mall was built on caissons over Scajaquada Creek. Additionally, a portion of the multi-level parking ramp near the Bon-Ton store was demolished to make way for new store fronts that would create a boulevard-like design along the mall's western facade. A five-storey, 1,200-vehicle parking ramp was also built to replace the spaces affected by the expansion.

=== 2010s ===
A new decade brought many changes to the now 21-year-old shopping center. In 2011, Anthropologie, a trendy women's clothing and accessory store joined the mall. A wave of other stores opened that year as well including Fossil, which opened its second area location in a 4,000-square-foot (370-square-meter) space on the first floor, Free People, a Philadelphia-based retailer which opened its first Upstate New York location in a 2,000-square-foot (190-square-meter) space on the first floor, and White House/Black Market whose 3,000-square-foot (280-square-meter) store is its second area location. Gordon Biersch, a brew pub opened in the restaurant outparcel attached to the parking garage.

In 2013, several aesthetic upgrades were made throughout the mall. New Italian marble floors were installed. Lighting and seating updates were made as well. The main entrances were updated to reflect the 2007 expansion.

In 2014, a Lululemon was added, which has since expanded to occupy more space and become a major retailer for the mall.

In November 2014, the mall was involved in a controversy regarding stores being fined for deciding not to open on Thanksgiving Day. The mall owners threatened to fine stores $200 an hour if they remain closed on the holiday, up to a maximum of $1200. This was because all mall stores were expecting to open at midnight. A local radio station reported that a mandatory notice was posted around the mall stating "we caution you to be open at 6 pm when the rest of the mall opens." When owners of smaller stores in the mall found out about the policy, they quickly spoke out against it. The manager of a small T-shirt store located in the mall said it forced him to open the shop because "[we are] a small company" and the fine would "substantial to us." Local citizens outraged by this policy also spoke out against it, with a massive boycott against the mall organized at 12:00am on Black Friday, with over 4,000 people purportedly attending, which encouraged shoppers to "steer clear" of the Walden Galleria. An Indiegogo campaign entitled Coffee and Cheer on Thanksgiving Day was also started to deliver coffee to the mall employees "forced to work at supper time" during Thanksgiving.

Although Pyramid did continue to enforce this policy, it shifted some of the blame to anchor tenant Macy's, who was a major proponent of Thanksgiving sales nationwide, for pressuring the mall into adopting the policy.

Around this time World of Beer opened which buoyed off of the craft beer boom happening in the Buffalo area. About a month later in September, Dave and Buster's relocated to the center in a 30,000-square-foot (2,800-square-meter) space next to the Cheesecake Factory.

In 2017, Sears, a major tenant, closed its doors at the mall.

In late 2019, Macy's announced that their location was among the first to receive millions of dollars in cosmetic upgrades. Regal Cinemas also announced upgrades which saw it bring 4-DX technology that immerses people in movies with moving seats, wind, rain, lights and even smells.

=== 2020s ===
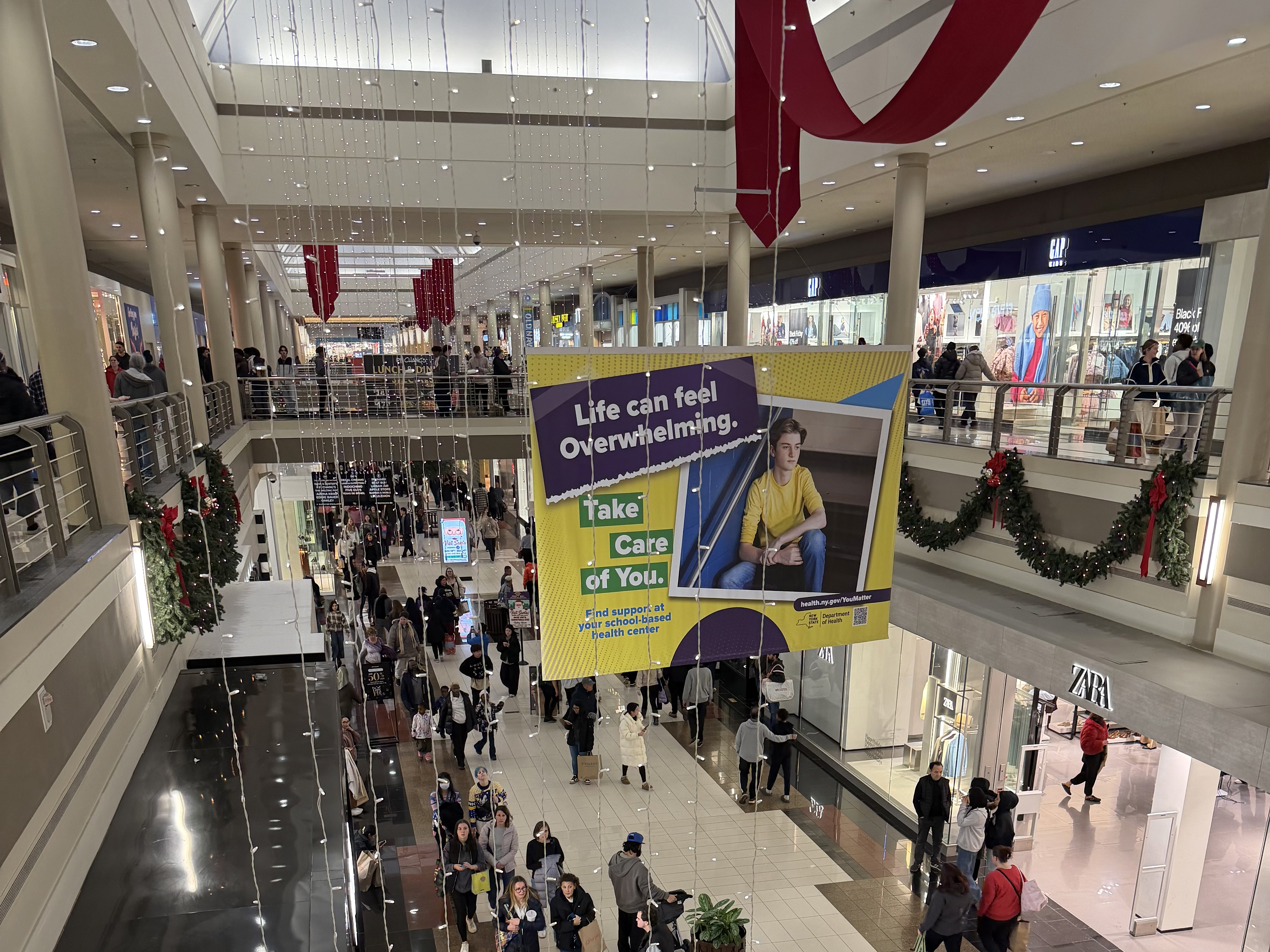
Mall in 2025

On August 27, 2020, it was announced that Lord & Taylor would close all its stores, as a result of the economic impact of the COVID-19 pandemic. Early plans envisioned the 99,534-square-foot (9,247-square-meter) store reconstructed into a modern space known as York Factory, a co-working sub-brand offering soft amenities such as a program delivering lunch straight to offices, bike rentals, a physical and mental wellness studio, salon services, and weekly events.

In 2021, Walden Galleria was listed among the top 20 most visited shopping centers in America attracting over 23 million visitors from the United States and Canada.

In April 2023, a Primark opened in the space previously occupied by Sears.

In 2023, Going, Going, Gone! opened a store in the lower level of the former Sears.

In June 2025, Wells Fargo placed the mall into receivership amidst a foreclosure on the mall after its owners, Pyramid Management Group, defaulted on a $270 million loan.

In 2026, it was announced that the Going, Going, Gone! store would become the Swedish retailer IKEA. IKEA plans to utilize the entirety of the Going, Going, Gone! space to open their store. The new store is expected to be 67,000 square feet (6224.5-square-meters). The store is currently being renovated with an opening date planned for 2027.
