= List of NFTA Metro bus routes =

== Overview ==
NFTA Metro carried many of its present route numbers and names from the previous International Railway Company routes. Otherwise, much of the routing follows (loosely) the following number schematic:

- 1-49 City of Buffalo and Erie County routes
- 50-59 City of Niagara Falls and Niagara County routes
- 60-81 Express routes to/from Downtown Buffalo
- 90-97 Special event routes
- 101-118 School bus routes
- 200-216 Metrolink routes

The routes recently underwent a major revamping. Gone are the original "A" designations to "City Line." Replacing them are destinations to general areas as noted in the listings.

=== Currently operating routes ===
Route Number	Route Name	Originating Garage (1, 2)	Terminals	Notes
1 Lovejoy; 1A	William	BW	Downtown (Buffalo Metropolitan Transportation Center); City Line (Goethe Loop); Appletree (Appletree Business Park)	As of December 4, 2016, some trips have been adjusted to serve South Ogden Plaza. As of June 18, 2017, route no longer lays over at Carolina Street and Busti Avenue.
2 Kaisertown; 2A; 2B	Clinton	BW	Downtown (Buffalo Metropolitan Transportation Center); City Line (Fernwood Loop); Lancaster (Pleasant and Aurora) Appletree (Appletree Business Park)	As of June 18, 2017, route no longer lays over at Carolina Street and Busti Avenue. As of February 13, 2022, service to Bank of America (Transit Road) discontinued.
3 Riverside	Grant	Fr	Downtown (North Division Street and Ellicott Street); City Line (Vulcan Loop)	As of June 21, 2015, due to construction of the new Delaware North headquarters, resulting in safety concerns with West Chippewa Street being too narrow for buses to continue navigating, route will operate as follows: outbound, Niagara Square to Niagara Street, right Elmwood Avenue and continue regular route beyond West Chippewa Street. As of June 19, 2016, route no longer services Kenmore and Military; instead, it services Vulcan Loop, previously served by route 5 and 35 buses after those routes began servicing the new Black Rock/Riverside Transit Hub in December 2015. As of September 4, 2016, some trips have been added to serve Charter School for Applied Technologies. As of February 13, 2022, inbound route no longer services West Huron Street.
4 Sloan; 4B	Broadway	BW	Downtown (Buffalo Metropolitan Transportation Center); City Line (Michael Loop); Thruway Mall	"Sloan" trips operate to Michael Loop, "B" trips operate via Broadway to Harlem. As of June 18, 2017, route no longer lays over at Carolina Street and Busti Avenue. As of March 4, 2018, "H" trips discontinued. As of February 13, 2022, most weekend trips serve Thruway Mall.
5 University Station	Niagara-Kenmore	Fr	Downtown (North Division Street and Ellicott Street); University Station	Route changed to move service over Sheridan Drive to separate route 35 and add service from previous route 30. As of December 6, 2015, route no longer services Hertel Avenue or Tonawanda Street between Hertel and Ontario, nor does it service Vulcan Loop.
6 Galleria Mall	Sycamore	BW	Downtown (Lower Terrace and Charles Street); Walden Galleria Mall	Route changed to move service over Galleria Drive to allow easier access to Walden Galleria Mall; as such, route no longer services Walden Avenue east of Galleria Drive. As of February 13, 2022, route no longer services Waterfront Village; instead, route will operate as follows; inbound, regular route to Washington and North Division, right North Division, continue Church, left Lower Terrace, layover; outbound, Lower Terrace, left Seneca, left Franklin, right Church, continue South Division, left Ellicott, regular route.
8 Main-Bailey/Waterfront Village	Main	CS	Marine Drive; City Line (Main-Bailey Loop)	As of October 31, 2010, route no longer services Michigan Avenue. As of June 21, 2015, route will operate as follows: regular route to Wilkeson and Erie, right Erie, left Marine Drive and continue regular route. As of March 16, 2020, route changed to add weekend service to the Buffalo-Niagara Medical Campus to alleviate pressure off routes 14 and 16; as such, route no longer services Goodell Street; additionally, bus stops at Goodell Street and Main Street and Main Street and Virginia Street permanently discontinued. Instead, outbound route will operate as follows: regular route to Ellicott and Goodell, continue Ellicott, left Carlton, right Main, regular route. As of February 13, 2022, service to University Plaza reinstated.
11A; 11D	Colvin	Fr	Downtown (North Division Street and Ellicott Street); Paramount (Paramount Loop); Tonawanda Industrial Park (Fillmore Avenue and Wales Avenue)	As of March 6, 2016, route changed to move service over Hertel Avenue to alleviate pressure off route 23 due to safety concerns with the fleet of LFS CNG buses being too big to meet the 9'1" height restriction of the rail bridge that crosses over Colvin Avenue; as such, route no longer services Amherst Street or Colvin Avenue south of Hertel Avenue. Instead, route will operate as follows: inbound, regular route to Colvin and Hertel, right Hertel, left Delaware, regular route; outbound, regular route to Delaware and Amherst, continue Delaware, right Hertel, left Colvin, regular route.
12 Niagara Street	Utica	CS	Niagara (Niagara Street and Hampshire Street); City Line (Main-Bailey Loop)	As of October 31, 2010, route no longer services Huntley Loop. As of June 21, 2015, route changed to move service over Richmond Avenue; due to safety concerns with Chenango Street and Hampshire Street between West Ferry Street and Winter Street being too narrow for buses to continue navigating, route no longer services Hampshire Street, Chenango Street or West Utica Street west of Richmond Avenue. As of February 13, 2022, route changed to alleviate pressure off routes 13 and 23; as such, route no longer services French Street or Kehr Street. Instead, route will operate as follows: inbound, regular route to East Ferry and Kehr, continue East Ferry, left Fillmore, right East Utica, regular route; outbound, regular route to East Utica and Fillmore, left Fillmore, right East Ferry, regular route.
13 Utica Station; 13C; 13D; 13E	Kensington	CS	Utica Station (Main Street and East Utica Street); University Station	As of October 30, 2010, "B" trips discontinued. 13C operates from Hutch Tech HS to University Station.
14 Ridge Road; 14 B 14 C	Abbott	BW	Downtown (Washington Street and Mohawk Street); Buffalo-Niagara Medical Campus (Washington Street and Carlton Street); The Shops; McKinley Mall; ECC South (Erie Community College South Campus)	As of June 21, 2015, due to construction of LECOM Harborcenter, resulting in safety concerns with Washington Street between Scott Street and Perry Street being too narrow for buses to continue navigating, route no longer services Perry Street west of Michigan Avenue or Washington Street south of Exchange Street. Instead, route will operate as follows: inbound, regular route to Michigan and Perry, continue Michigan, right Carroll, right North Carroll, right Exchange, right Washington and continue regular route; outbound, regular route to Washington and Exchange, left Exchange, left North Carroll, left Seneca, left Michigan and continue regular route. As of March 8, 2020, route no longer services Ellicott Street or Washington Street north of Genesee Street; instead, route will operate as follows: regular route to Ellicott and Genesee, right Genesee, left Michigan, left Carlton and layover; outbound, Carlton, right Main, right High, right Michigan, right Genesee, left Washington, regular route. As of April 4, 2022, due to North Carroll being permanently closed, route will operate as follows: Inbound, regular route to Michigan and Scott, left Scott, right Washington, continue regular route. Outbound, regular route to Washington and Scott Streets, left Scott, right Michigan.
15 Cazenovia Park; 15B	Seneca	BW	Downtown (Lower Terrace and Charles Street); City Line; Southgate Plaza	As of June 2021, service resumes for some trips to start/end at City Line. All weekend and holiday service will continue "B" trip to Southgate Plaza.
16 Botanical Gardens; 16B; 16H	South Park	BW	Downtown (Washington Street and Mohawk Street); Buffalo-Niagara Medical Campus (Washington Street and Carlton Street); City Line (Lackawanna Victory Transit Center); McKinley Mall; Hamburg (Main Street and Buffalo Street)	As of June 21, 2015, due to construction of LECOM Harborcenter, resulting in safety concerns with Washington Street between Scott Street and Perry Street being too narrow for buses to continue navigating, route no longer services Perry Street west of Michigan Avenue or Washington Street south of Exchange Street. Instead, route will operate as follows: inbound, regular route to Michigan and Perry, continue Michigan, right Carroll, right North Carroll, right Exchange, right Washington and continue regular route; outbound, regular route to Washington and Exchange, left Exchange, left North Carroll, left Seneca, left Michigan and continue regular route. As of March 4, 2018, new "H" trips added to serve Hamburg due to discontinuation of route 36. As of March 8, 2020, route no longer services Ellicott Street or Washington Street north of Genesee Street; instead, route will operate as follows: regular route to Ellicott and Genesee, right Genesee, left Michigan, left Carlton and layover; outbound, regular route to Washington and Carlton, continue Carlton, right Main, right High, right Michigan, right Genesee, left Washington, regular route. As of April 4, 2022, due to North Carroll being permanently closed, route will operate as follows: Inbound, regular route to Michigan and Scott, left Scott, right Washington, continue regular route. Outbound, regular route to Washington and Scott Streets, left Scott, right Michigan.
18 Delavan Station	Jefferson	CS	Delavan/Canisius University Station; Louisiana (Louisiana Street and South Park Avenue)	As of June 19, 2016, route no longer services Louisiana Street between Seneca Street and Perry Street, nor does it service Seneca Street west of Hamburg Street; however, route extended to Larkinville, previously serviced by route 24.
19 University Station	Bailey	BW	University Station; Bailey/Abbott	A few trips operate over Dingens Street into New Buffalo Industrial Park.
20 Orchard	Elmwood	Fr	Downtown (Ellicott Loop); Orchard (Orchard Loop)	As of June 21, 2015, due to construction of the new Delaware North headquarters, resulting in safety concerns with West Chippewa Street being too narrow for buses to continue navigating, route will operate as follows: Outbound, Niagara Square to Niagara Street, right Elmwood Avenue and continue regular route beyond West Chippewa Street. As of February 13, 2022, inbound route no longer services West Huron Street.
22 West Side; 22A; 22S	Porter-Best	CS	Niagara; Thruway Mall	Route extended to alleviate pressure off route 6; as such, route no longer services Walden-Bailey Loop; "A" trips operate over Pine Ridge Road into Villa Maria College. 22S "City Honors HS" operates from City Honors HS to West Side, while "International Prep HS" operates from International Prep HS to Thruway Mall.
23A; 23R; 23S	Fillmore-Hertel	CS/Fr	Black Rock/Riverside Transit Hub; Bailey/Abbott	Route changed to move service over Niagara Street to service the new Black Rock/Riverside Transit Hub. As of December 6, 2015, route no longer services the Marina Vista Apartments. "R" trips operate from Bailey Abbott Loop to Riverside HS, while "S" trips operate from Mckinley HS to Bailey Abbott Loop.
24A; 24B; 24L	Genesee	CS	Downtown (Waterfront Village); City Line (Andrews Loop); Airport (Buffalo-Niagara International Airport)	As of June 19, 2016, some trips have been adjusted to serve IQOR. As of February 13, 2022, route no longer services Exchange Street Station; instead, route changed to end at Waterfront Village, previously served by route 6 when that route was changed to end at Lower Terrace and Charles to alleviate pressure off route 15. As of December 8th 2025, X trips have been removed and changed to 78
25A; 25B; 25D	Delaware	Fr	Downtown (Ellicott Loop); Orchard; Tonawanda (Main and Niagara Transit Center); North Tonawanda (Mid City Plaza)	As of June 21, 2015, "D" trips extended to Mid City Plaza due to discontinuation of route 57.
26A; 26B	Delavan	CS	Niagara; Thruway Mall	Route changed to move service over Harlem Road to replace route 24D trips to Thruway Mall. As such, "A" trips no longer service Andrews Loop. 26B "City Line" operates from Lafayette HS to Andrews Loop. 26B "Genesee" operates from McKinley HS to around Genesee and Best Streets. 26A "McKinley HS" operates from Andrews Loop to McKinley HS. 26B "Riverside HS" operates from Andrews Loop to Riverside HS.
32 Black Rock Riverside Transit Hub; 32A; 32S	Amherst	BW	Black Rock/Riverside Transit Hub; Thruway Mall	Route changed to move service over Galleria Drive to allow easier access to Walden Galleria Mall; as such, route no longer services Walden Avenue between Galleria Drive and Millennium Hotel entrance. As of December 6, 2015, route changed to move service over Niagara Street to service the new Black Rock/Riverside Transit Hub; as such, route no longer services Tonawanda Street north of Amherst Street or Hamilton Street. 32S "Riverside HS" inbound operates from Huntley Loop to Riverside HS, while outbound operates from Riverside HS to Thruway Mall. 32A trip does not service Rockwell Rd., with the eventual outcome of eliminating that stop on all trips.
34	Niagara Falls Blvd.	Fr	University Station; Amherst Town Center	As of September 6, 2010, "M" trips discontinued. As of March 8, 2020, weekend service permanently extended; last Saturday inbound bus leaves Amherst Town Center at 9:42 pm, last outbound bus leaves University Station at 10:30 pm, last Sunday inbound bus leaves Amherst Town Center at 9:44 pm, last outbound bus leaves University Station at 10:00 pm. As of December 27, 2020, "H" trips discontinued; also, route no longer services portion of Creekside Road between Niagara Falls Boulevard and Woodridge Drive or portion of North French Road between Sweet Home Road and Pineview Drive; instead, route changed to operate as follows: outbound, regular route to Niagara Falls Boulevard and Creekside Drive, continue Niagara Falls Boulevard to East Robinson Road, right East Robinson, left Sundridge, right Glenhaven, right Sweet Home, right North French, left John Glenn, left Commerce, continue past Sweet Home onto Dodge, right John James Audubon Parkway, left Gordon R. Yaeger Drive to Audubon Town Center; inbound buses leave from Amherst Town Center turning right onto John James Audubon Parkway, left Dodge, continue past Sweet Home onto Commerce, right John Glenn, right North French, left Sweet Home, left Glenhaven, left Sundridge, right East Robinson, left Niagara Falls Boulevard, regular route. As of March 1, 2026, route no longer services Boulevard Mall.
35	Sheridan	Fr	Black Rock/Riverside Transit Hub; Flint Circle (University at Buffalo, The State University of New York North Campus)	Route replaces portion of route 34M trip over Alberta Drive that was discontinued with the fall 2010 service changes. Service is extended to the University at Buffalo, The State University of New York North Campus. As of December 6, 2015, route no longer services Vulcan Loop; instead, it services the new Black Rock/Riverside Transit Hub; however, it does service the Marina Vista Apartments, previously served by route 23. As of February 13, 2022, route no longer services Maple Road east of Sweet Home Road, nor does it service Flint Road; instead, route operates as follows: outbound, regular route to Maple and Sweet Home, left Sweet Home, right Rensch, right Hadley, left Ausperger, layover at Coventry Loop; inbound, right Ausperger, right Hadley, left Rensch, left Sweet Home, right Maple, regular route.
40 Buffalo; Niagara Falls	Buffalo-Niagara Falls (via Grand Island)	Fr	Buffalo (Buffalo Metropolitan Transportation Center); Niagara Falls (Portage Road Transit Center)	As of December 6, 2015, route no longer services Buffalo Avenue; instead, all buses will be required to enter and exit the Niagara Scenic Parkway; however, it does service the new Black Rock/Riverside Transit Hub. As of December 5, 2021, route will have limited stops between Black Rock/Riverside Transit Hub and Niagara and Maryland.
42 Southgate	Lackawanna	BW	Downtown (Buffalo Metropolitan Transportation Center); Southgate Plaza	As of March 4, 2018, route extended to Downtown Buffalo due to discontinuation of route 36. As of March 2, 2025, route no longer services Perry Street between Michigan and Chicago; instead, route changed to operate as follows: outbound, regular route to Michigan and Scott, continue Scott, right Chicago, left Perry, right Louisiana, regular route; inbound, regular route to Perry and Chicago, right Chicago, left Scott, regular route. As of Summer 2024, the Downtown layover is no longer at Ellicott and Mohawk, but at Buffalo Metropolitan Transportation Center
44A; 44B	Lockport	CS	Buffalo (University Station); Crosspoint (Crosspoint Business Park); Lockport (Main Street and Locust Street)	A few weekday trips operate over Lockport Memorial Hospital.
46 Lancaster; 46A	Lancaster	BW	Thruway Mall; Thruway Mall-via Amazon Lancaster	Route replaces route 6 service east of the Walden Galleria Mall and operates as a one-way loop past Buffalo-Depew. As of April 20, 2016, route services new Walmart at Walden Avenue and Nagel Road, previous site of the Super Flea Market. As of February 13, 2022; service to Harlequin Books discontinued and service to Amazon Lancaster started.
47C	Wehrle (formerly Youngs Road)	CS	University Station; Transit (Eastern Hills Mall)	As of February 13, 2022, route extended to Eastern Hills Mall to alleviate pressure off route 48 and replace portion of route 24P over Transit Road; as such, route no longer services Main Street east of Harlem Road, nor does it service Erie Community College North Campus or Buffalo Niagara International Airport; instead, route changed to operate as follows: outbound, regular route to Main and Harlem, right Harlem, left Wehrle, right Youngs, left Lawrence Bell, left Earhart, right Wehrle, left Transit, layover; inbound, left Transit, right Wehrle, left Earhart, right Lawrence Bell, right Youngs, left Wehrle, right Harlem, left Main, regular route.
48A; 48C	Williamsville	CS	University Station; Transit (Eastern Hills Mall)	Most weekday trips serve Erie Community College North Campus.
49	East Amherst (formerly Millard Suburban)	CS	University Station; Transit (Eastern Hills Mall)	As of February 13, 2022, route no longer services Sheridan Drive east of Hopkins Road. Service to Eastern Hills Mall reinstated to alleviate pressure off route 48.
50A; 50B	Main-Niagara (formerly University)	Fr	Portage Road Transit Center; Niagara Falls Transit Center (near Fashion Outlets)	Service to Lewiston discontinued as of December 5, 2021.
52A	North End Circulator (formerly Hyde Park)	Fr	St Mary's Hospital; Portage Road Transit Center	
55A; 55T	Pine Ave.	Fr	Portage Road Transit Center; Niagara Falls Transit Center; Aquarium of Niagara	Serves Downtown Niagara Falls. "T" trips operate from mid-May through end of October. As of September 6, 2020, due to the COVID-19 impact to NFTA operations, "B" trips to Niagara Falls Transit Center and Summit Business Park discontinued.
59	Airport-NCCC	Fr	Niagara Falls Transit Center (near Fashion Outlets); NCCC	Service began December 5, 2021.
60	Niagara Falls	Fr	Buffalo (Buffalo Metropolitan Transportation Center); Niagara Falls Transit Center (Near Fashion Outlets)	
61	Tonawanda	Fr	Downtown (North Division Street and Ellicott Street); Tonawanda (Main Street and Niagara Street)	
64	Lockport	CS	Downtown (North Division Street and Ellicott Street); Lockport (Main Street and Locust Street)	
66 A 66 B	Williamsville	CS	Downtown (Allen/Medical Campus Station); Transit (Millersport Highway and Transit Road)	Service extended to Millersport Highway and Transit Road (66B) due to discontinuation of route 65.
69	Lancaster	BW	Downtown (Lower Terrace and Charles Street); Lancaster (Broadway and Central Avenue)	As of September 6, 2020, due to the COVID-19 impact to NFTA operations, "A" trips to Alden (Broadway and Sullivan Avenue) discontinued. As of June 19, 2022, route number changed from 69B to 69.
70	East Aurora	BW	Downtown (Lower Terrace and Charles Street); East Aurora (Fillmore Avenue and Riley Street)	As of February 13, 2022, due to a bus driver shortage, "A" trips through Elma (Clinton Street and Bowen Road) discontinued. As of June 19, 2022, route number changed from 70C to 70.
72	Orchard Park	BW	Downtown (Lower Terrace and Charles Street); Orchard Park (Abbott Road and Armor Duells Road)	As of February 13, 2022, due to a bus driver shortage, "A" trips to ECC South (Erie Community College South Campus) discontinued. As of June 19, 2022, route number changed from 72P to 72.
74 A 74 B	Hamburg	BW	Downtown (North Division Street and Ellicott Street); Athol Springs Transit Center; Hamburg (Main Street and Buffalo Street)	As of February 13, 2022, due to a bus driver shortage, "B" trips to North Boston (Herman Hill Road) discontinued. As of June 19, 2022, "B" trips operate to Hamburg (Main Street and Buffalo Street).
76	Lakeshore (formerly Lotus Bay)	BW	Downtown (North Division Street and Ellicott Street); Seneca One Stop	As of March 21, 2021, service extended from Seneca Bingo to Seneca One Stop. As of September 5, 2021, route number changed from 76S to 76.
77	Buffalo-Niagara Falls	Fr	Buffalo (Buffalo Metropolitan Transportation Center); Niagara Falls (Portage Road Transit Center)	Service began December 5, 2021 to alleviate pressure off route 60.
78	Cheektowaga Express	CS	Downtown, Buell Park & Ride; Buffalo Niagara International Airport	As of December 8, 2025, route has changed from 24X to 78.
81	Eastside	CS	Downtown (South Division Street and Washington Street)	
101 S	North-South	BW	Lackawanna ("The Shops") and Botanical Gardens to McKinley Vocational High School	Buffalo Public School bus routes. Only operate on school days, but are open to general public use. As of September 4, 2022, all route numbers changed to 101S.
101 S	North-South	BW	Hutchinson Central Technical High School to Bailey/Abbott	Buffalo Public School bus routes. Only operate on school days, but are open to general public use. As of September 4, 2022, all route numbers changed to 101S.
101 S	North-South	BW	South Park High School to Utica Station	Buffalo Public School bus routes. Only operate on school days, but are open to general public use. As of September 4, 2022, all route numbers changed to 101S.
102 S	Bailey-East	BW	Kaisertown to McKinley Vocational High School	Buffalo Public School bus route. Only operates on school days—and then only one, one-way trip—but is open to general public use. Route 102B service from McKinley Vocational High School and Burgard Vocational High School to Lackawanna Victory Transit Center discontinued as of February 13, 2022. As of September 4, 2022, route number changed from 102F to 102S.
103 S	East-Suburban	BW	Lackawanna ("The Shops") to/from St. Mary's High School, Lancaster (Central & Broadway)	Catholic High School bus route. Only operates on school days, but is open to general public use. As of September 4, 2022, route number changed from 103A to 103S.
104 S	South-Central	Fr	City Honors School to City Line (Starin & Kenmore)	Buffalo Public School bus route. Only operates on school days—and then only one, one-way trip—but is open to general public use. As of September 5, 2021, route number changed from 104F to 104. As of September 4, 2022, route number changed from 104 to 104S.
106 S	South-Suburban	BW	Downtown (Buffalo Metropolitan Transportation Center) to/from Saint Francis High School, Athol Springs	Catholic High School bus route. Only operates on school days, but is open to general public use. As of September 4, 2022, route number changed from 106A to 106S.
110 S	West-North	CS	Burgard Vocational High School to Black Rock/Riverside Transit Hub	Buffalo Public School bus route. Only operates on school days—and then only one, one-way trip—but is open to general public use. As of September 4, 2022, route number changed from 110A to 110S.
111 S	South-Michigan	CS	Lovejoy & North Ogden to/from Buffalo Academy for Visual and Performing Arts	Buffalo Public School bus routes. Only operate on school days, but are open to general public use. Route 111B service from East Community High School to Amherst Station discontinued as of February 13, 2022. As of September 4, 2022, all route numbers changed to 111S.
111 S	South-Michigan	CS	City Honors School to Lovejoy & North Ogden	Buffalo Public School bus routes. Only operate on school days, but are open to general public use. Route 111B service from East Community High School to Amherst Station discontinued as of February 13, 2022. As of September 4, 2022, all route numbers changed to 111S.

- (1) Originating Garage-Terminal routes are based at one of three garages: BW=Babcock-William, CS=Cold Springs and Fr=Frontier
- (2) All weekend and holiday service originate out of Frontier

=== Previously operating routes ===
Route Number	Route Name	Operation from/to	Notes
7	Baynes-Richmond	Downtown (North Division Street and Ellicott Street); Forest (H.H. Richardson Complex)	Service discontinued May 24, 2020 due to the impact of COVID-19 to NFTA operations.
9	Parkside/Zoo	Downtown; Delavan/Canisius University Station; City Line (Coburg Loop & Kenmore); Brighton & Eggert ("B" trips)	Service originated as the 9-Kenmore streetcar route in the early 1900s. Service replaced in 1994 by an extension of routes 18 and 39 (latter route discontinued December 24, 1995). Route then briefly serviced by Bflo Transit, Inc.
10	West Utica	Downtown; Utica Station; Niagara & Ferry	Service originated as a streetcar route in the early 1900s. Service combined with route 12 East Utica and renamed Utica on June 23, 1985.
17	Central Terminal	Downtown (Hotels); Buffalo Central Terminal	Service continued until 1980s with some service on route 4C, operating Fillmore Avenue, Paderewski Drive and Memorial Drive, before returning onto Broadway.
17	Kensington-Suburban		Service began June 23, 1985. Service discontinued March 27, 1994. Replacement service offered by route 32 on Union Road from Wehrle Drive to Walden Galleria Mall and Thruway Mall, route 49 on Hopkins Road, Sheridan Drive, Transit Road and Maple Road and route 47 on Wehrle Drive, Erie Community College North Campus and Aero Drive.
20 E	Late Night Express	Downtown (Delaware & West Chippewa); Delavan/Canisius University Station	Short-lived shuttle service between Canisius College, Medaille College, Buffalo State College and the Chippewa Entertainment District. Service originally operated weekends, then reduced to Thursday nights only before being discontinued entirely due to low ridership and budget cuts.
21	Michigan/Forest	Downtown; Main-Michigan (Cold Spring Garage); Delavan/Canisius University Station; Forest & Niagara	Service discontinued March 24, 1993. Replacement service offered by route 8B on Michigan Avenue from Best Street to William Street to ease pressure off route 8A before being discontinued October 31, 2010 and partially replaced March 8, 2020 by part of routes 14 and 16.
24X	Geneese	Downtown, Burrell Park & Ride, Buffalo Niagara International Airport.	Service discontinued December 8, 2025. Service replaced with Route 78
27	Ridge Road	Downtown or Ford Plant; Southgate Plaza; Orchard Park; East Aurora	Service discontinued December 1995. Replacement service partially offered by route 42.
27	Erie County Home	Airport (Buffalo Niagara International Airport); Wende (Erie County Home)	Replaced service previously offered by route 24C. Passengers were required to transfer between routes at the Buffalo Niagara International Airport. Service discontinued March 7, 2015 due to extremely low ridership.
28	Sheridan	Northtown Plaza; Sheridan & Mill	Service discontinued early 1980s. Replacement service partially offered by route 49B from University Station.
29	Wohlers	Niagara (Maryland Street and Efner Street); Delavan/Canisius University Station	As of June 19, 2016, route changed to move service over Main Street. Due to construction of the new School of Medicine and Biomedical Sciences medical school that has since been completed, route no longer serviced Washington Street between High Street and Virginia Street. Inbound passengers who wished to access Allen/Medical Campus Station were required to deboard across from the station at Main and Allen Streets. Also, outbound trips no longer serviced Riley Street or Northampton Street. Service discontinued May 24, 2020 due to the impact of COVID-19 to NFTA operations.
30	Kenmore	Dupont (Sheridan Drive); Vulcan Loop; University Station; Airport (Buffalo Niagara International Airport)	Service discontinued October 31, 2010. Replacement service offered by route 5 from Vulcan Loop to University Station and route 47C from University Station to Buffalo Niagara International Airport.
31	Ogden	University Station; Broadway/Ogden; McKinley Circle; Nason Loop or Bailey/Abbott; Bethlehem Steel	Service discontinued March 27, 1994 and replaced by an extension of route 22.
33	Tonawanda/North Tonawanda	Main/Niagara; Warner/Witmer (M or P); Ruie/Nash (S, T or W); Hackett/Hinds (J or K); Ellicott Creek/Frederick (F); The Summit (B or P)	Service discontinued in 1988 and replaced by routes 20 (20T) and 25 (25H, 25M).
35	Hamburg via Abbott	Downtown; McKinley Mall; ECC South; Hamburg (Main & Buffalo)	Service discontinued and replaced by an extension of route 14. Service currently does not operate south of Erie Community College South Campus.
36	Hamburg	Downtown (East Mohawk Street and Ellicott Street); Hamburg (Main Street and Buffalo Street); McKinley Mall	Service discontinued March 4, 2018 and replaced by an extension of routes 16 and 42.
37	Hamburg via Camp	Downtown; Ford Plant; South Park & Scranton; Hamburg (Main & Buffalo); Boston	Replacement service partially offered by route 74 during rush hours.
38	Buffalo/Angola	Downtown; Angola	Service (via Angola) reassigned March 1993 to route 76. Remaining route discontinued December 24, 1995 due to cost-cutting measures by the NFTA.
39	Parker	University Station or Delavan/Canisius University Station; Brighton & Eggert; Northtown Plaza or Tonawanda (Ellicott Creek)	Service discontinued December 24, 1995. Route then briefly serviced by Bflo Transit, Inc.
41	Sheridan/Harlem	University Station; Thruway Plaza; Southgate Plaza (B)	Service discontinued upon the December 2001 schedule changes.
42	North Campus	University Station; Flint Circle	Shuttle service briefly operated in the 1990s between University Station and Flint Circle via North Bailey Avenue and Maple Road.
43	Mall Shuttle	Thruway Plaza; Appletree Business Park	Service began March 1993 as an extension of routes 4 and 6 to serve Walden Galleria Mall and Appletree Business Park from Thruway Mall. Service discontinued March 2001 and extended on route 4 to compensate for lost route. Service changed October 31, 2010 to discontinue route between Walden Galleria and Appletree Business Park with route 46 added to compensate portion of routes 4, 6B, 6C, 6D and 6F that were discontinued.
46	ECMC Shuttle	Delavan/Canisius University Station; Erie County Medical Center (ECMC)	This route operated as a shuttle to ease pressure off route 13A into Erie County Medical Center (ECMC).
51	Buffalo Av; Military Road	Downtown Niagara Falls; Krull; The Summit	Service merged with route 53.
51	Military North	The Summit; Niagara Transit Center; Niagara University	Service discontinued October 30, 2010 due to low ridership.
53	Niagara	Downtown Niagara Falls; The Summit	Service previously part of route 50-Buffalo Avenue-University-Highland. Service rejoined with route 50 on December 23, 2007 with Niagara Street alignment maintained.
54	Military	Portage Road Transit Center; Niagara Transit Center	Service discontinued May 24, 2020 due to the impact of COVID-19 to NFTA operations.
56	River Road	Kenmore & Military (Frontier Garage); Main & Niagara; The Summit; Niagara Transit Center	Service began March 24, 1993 as a continuation of buses operating from Frontier Station to Niagara Falls routes. Service discontinued October 30, 2010.
57	Flex Tonawandas	Main Street and Niagara Street; Niagara Falls International Airport	Replaced service previously offered on routes 25C and 25D into North Tonawanda. Service discontinued June 19, 2015 due to extremely low ridership.
58	Lockport City		
58	Lockport-Niagara Falls		Service discontinued in 1988.
62	Parker	Downtown; Ellicott Creek	Service discontinued April 29, 2012 due to low ridership.
63	Riverside	Downtown; Kenmore & Military	Service discontinued April 29, 2012 due to low ridership.
65	Amherst	Downtown Buffalo; Millersport & Transit	Service discontinued April 29, 2012 due to low ridership and partially replaced by route 66 to Millersport Highway and Transit Road.
67	Cleveland Hill	Downtown (Allen/Medical Campus Station); ECC North (Erie Community College North Campus)	Service discontinued February 13, 2022 due to low ridership. Replacement service partially offered by routes 12 and 32.
68	George Urban	Downtown (Canalside station); Airport (Buffalo Niagara International Airport)	Service discontinued May 24, 2020 due to the impact of COVID-19 to NFTA operations.
71	Holland		Service began March 24, 1993. Service discontinued December 24, 1995. Replacement service partially offered to Holland by routes 70 and 75 (latter route discontinued September 6, 2020 due to the impact of COVID-19 to NFTA operations).
73	Lancaster		Service began March 24, 1993. Service discontinued December 24, 1995. Replacement service partially offered to Lancaster by route 69.
75	West Seneca	Downtown (Lower Terrace and Charles Street); Bank of America (Transit Road); Bullis (Seneca Creek Road and Union Road)	Service discontinued September 6, 2020 due to the impact of COVID-19 to NFTA operations.
79	Tonawanda	Downtown (Exchange Street Station); Main & Niagara	Service discontinued May 24, 2020 due to the impact of COVID-19 to NFTA operations.
80	ECC Shuttle	Tri-campus shuttle connecting ECC campuses	Service replaced by route 211 ECC Circulator (route 211 discontinued summer 2013 when route operation given to Erie Community College).
82	Outer Harbor Shuttle	Short-lived route serving businesses on the outer harbor.	Service discontinued in 2002 due to low ridership.
90	Bills Express; Portage Road Transportation Center	Short-lived route serving Buffalo Bills home games at Highmark Stadium.	Service discontinued April 29, 2012 due to funding crisis.
91	Bills Express; Tonawanda (Township)	Short-lived route serving Buffalo Bills home games at Highmark Stadium.	Service discontinued April 29, 2012 due to funding crisis.
92	Bills Express; University Station	Short-lived route serving Buffalo Bills home games at Highmark Stadium.	Service discontinued April 29, 2012 due to funding crisis.
93	Bills Express; Buffalo Metropolitan Transportation Center	Short-lived route serving Buffalo Bills home games at Highmark Stadium.	Service discontinued April 29, 2012 due to funding crisis.
94	Bills Express; Niagara Falls Transportation Center	Short-lived route serving Buffalo Bills home games at Highmark Stadium.	Service discontinued April 29, 2012 due to funding crisis.
95	Bills Express; Thruway Plaza	Short-lived route serving Buffalo Bills home games at Highmark Stadium.	Service discontinued April 29, 2012 due to funding crisis.
96	Bills Express; Clarence Mall	Short-lived route serving Buffalo Bills home games at Highmark Stadium.	Service discontinued April 29, 2012 due to funding crisis.
97	Darien Lake	Service operated between Downtown Buffalo and Darien Lake Theme Park Resort.	Service discontinued April 29, 2012 due to low ridership and high cost of operating, although service was reinstated to run during the summer of 2012 as the season was about to begin when service was discontinued.
112	Grant-North	East High School to City Line (Kenmore & Vulcan)	Buffalo Public School bus route. Only operates on school days—and then only one, one-way trip—but is open to general public use. Service discontinued December 21, 2019.
200	North Tonawanda-Wheatfield		Service discontinued May 1, 2012 due to low ridership.
201	Lockport Shuttle	Lockport (Main Street and Locust Street)	Hourly loop service in the City of Lockport. Service discontinued December 2, 2012 when route operation given to Niagara Rural Transportation as their route 2.
202	Metrolink Shuttle	Canalside station Parking Area (Michigan & Perry)	Short-lived shuttle route to parking area in lower Main Street area. Service discontinued March 25, 2007.
203	Erie County Home Express	Erie County Medical Center (ECMC); Wende	Shuttle service timed during shift changes for Erie County Home. Service discontinued October 30, 2010 and replaced by route 27, which was itself discontinued March 7, 2015 due to extremely low ridership.
204	Airport/Downtown Express	Downtown (North Division Street and Ellicott Street); Airport (Holtz Road Park and Ride)	Service discontinued June 17, 2019 and replaced by route 78.
206	Buffalo State Circulator	Fall/Spring semester shuttle service for Buffalo State College students with additional service to Tops and Wegmans.	Service discontinued September 2, 2018.
207	Elmwood Circulator	Buffalo State College; Buffalo Grand Hotel	Shuttle service for Buffalo State College students to shopping and entertainment. Service discontinued December 2010 due to route duplication on route 20.
208	Grant Circulator	Buffalo State College; Grant & Ferry	Shuttle service for Buffalo State College students to shopping and entertainment. Service discontinued June 2, 2009 due to route duplication on route 3.
209	Medaille Circulator	Medaille College/Buffalo Zoo	Shuttle service connecting Medaille College and remote parking at Buffalo Zoo. Service discontinued May 1, 2012 due to low ridership and funding.
210	Airport-Niagara Falls Express	Service operated between Buffalo Niagara International Airport, Niagara Falls Transportation Center and Portage Road Transit Center.	Service discontinued April 29, 2012 due to low ridership and funding.
211	ECC Circulator	Fall/Spring semester tri-campus shuttle serving ECC City Campus to either ECC North or ECC South.	Service discontinued summer 2013 when route operation given to Erie Community College.
216	McKinley Mall-Gowanda		Service discontinued May 1, 2012 due to low ridership and high cost of operating.
