= LaSalle station (Buffalo Metro Rail) =

Light rail station in Buffalo, New York

LaSalle
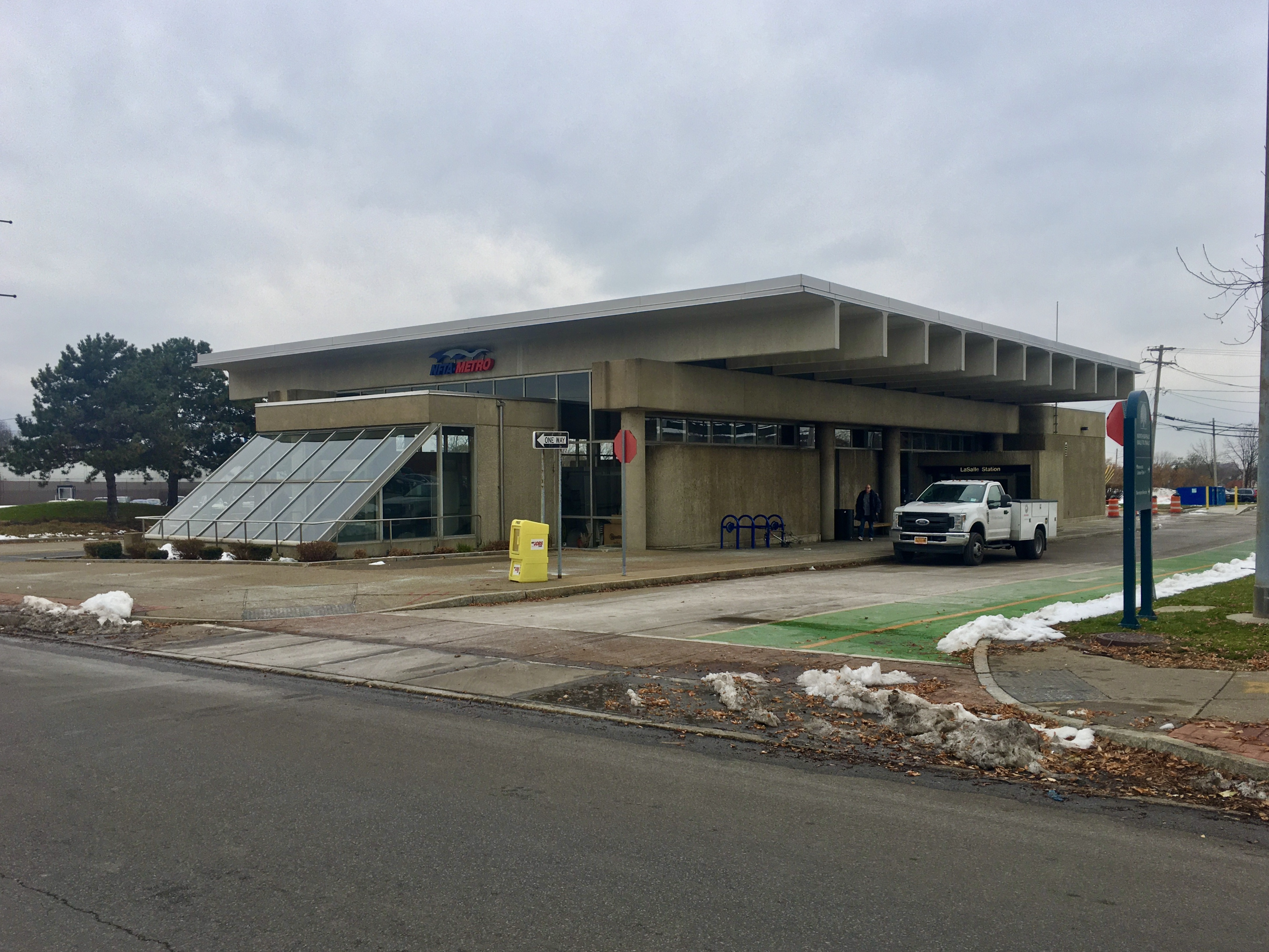
- LaSalle station headhouse as seen in November 2019

General information
- Location: 3030 Main Street; Buffalo, New York
- Coordinates: 42°56′53″N 78°49′48″W
- Owner: NFTA
- Platforms: 2 inter-connected side platforms
- Tracks: 2

Construction
- Structure type: Underground
- Depth: 47 feet (14 m)
- Parking: 800 park and ride spaces

Other information
- Fare zone: Paid fare

History
- Opened: November 10, 1986; 39 years ago

Passengers
- 2017: 232,017

Services
Preceding station	NFTA	Following station
University Terminus	Metro Rail	Amherst Street toward DL&W
Location

LaSalle station is a Buffalo Metro Rail underground station located at the corner of Main Street and LaSalle Avenue and is one stop from the northern terminus. Original drafting plans had the station used as a turnout between the current Metro Rail line and three proposed extensions; the Tonawanda Line, which would extend service into the cities of Tonawanda and Niagara Falls; the North Buffalo Line, which would extend service to Elmwood Avenue on an abandoned railroad right-of-way between Hertel and Kenmore Avenues; and the East Buffalo line, to connect the Main Street line with the proposed Airport Line, carrying passengers to the Buffalo-Niagara International Airport. The only visible sign of the turnout is located below ground by way of partially finished tunnel just west of the LaSalle station platforms. From May 20, 1985 to November 10, 1986, due to construction issues at LaSalle station, Amherst Street station served as the northern terminus. Since November 10, 1986, University station has served as the northern terminus.

== Bus connections ==
LaSalle station is one of four stations that offers an off-road bus loop, requiring passengers to board/debark using curbside stops (the other three being University, Delavan/Canisius College and Utica) and one of only two that has only one route serving the station (the other being Humboldt-Hospital):

- 8 Main

== Artwork ==
In 1979, an art selection committee was created, composed of NFTA commissioners and Buffalo area art experts, that would judge the artwork that would be displayed in and on the properties of eight stations on the Metro Rail line. Out of the 70 proposals submitted, 22 were chosen and are currently positioned inside and outside of the eight underground stations. LaSalle station is home of one piece of artwork, from Richard Gubernick of Buffalo.

== Notable places nearby ==
LaSalle Station is near:

- All-High Stadium
- Bennett High School
- Shoshone Park
- University Heights District
