= Francesca Woodman =

American photographer (1958–1981)

- Self-portrait, c. 1977
- Born: Francesca Stern Woodman; April 3, 1958; Denver, Colorado, U.S.
- Died: January 19, 1981 (aged 22); New York City, U.S.
- Education: Boulder High School
- Alma mater: Rhode Island School of Design
- Occupation: Photographer
- Parents: George Woodman (father); Betty Woodman (mother)

Francesca Stern Woodman (April 3, 1958 – January 19, 1981) was an American photographer best known for her black-and-white pictures featuring either herself or female models.

Many of her photographs show women, naked or clothed, blurred (due to movement and long exposure times), merging with their surroundings, or whose faces are obscured.

Years after her death in 1981, her work continues to be the subject of much positive critical attention.

== Life ==
Woodman was born in Denver, Colorado, to artists George Woodman and Betty Woodman (née Abrahams). Her mother was Jewish and her father was from a Protestant background. Her older brother, Charles, later became an associate professor of electronic art.

Woodman took her first self-portrait at age thirteen and continued photographing herself until she died. She attended public school in Boulder, Colorado, between 1963 and 1971, except for second grade, which she attended in Italy, where the family spent many summers between school years. She began high school in 1972 at Abbot Academy, a private Massachusetts boarding school. There, she began to develop her photographic skills and became interested in the art form. Abbot Academy merged with Phillips Academy in 1973; Woodman returned to Colorado in 1974 to finish high school, graduating from Boulder High School in 1975. Through 1975, she spent summers with her family in Italy in the Florentine countryside, where the family lived on an old farm.

Beginning in 1975, Woodman attended the Rhode Island School of Design (RISD) in Providence, Rhode Island. She studied in Rome between 1977 and 1978 in a RISD honors program. Because she spoke fluent Italian, she was able to befriend Italian intellectuals and artists. She returned to Rhode Island in late 1978 to graduate from RISD.

Woodman moved to New York City in 1979. After spending the summer of 1979 in Stanwood, Washington visiting her boyfriend at Pilchuck Glass School, she returned to New York "to make a career in photography." She sent portfolios of her work to fashion photographers, but "her solicitations did not lead anywhere". In the summer of 1980, she was an artist-in-residence at the MacDowell Colony in Peterborough, New Hampshire.

In late 1980, Woodman became depressed owing to the failure of her work to attract attention and because of a broken relationship. She survived a suicide attempt in the autumn of 1980, after which she lived with her parents in Manhattan.

== Death ==
On January 19, 1981, Woodman died by suicide at age 22 by jumping out of a loft window of a building on the East Side of New York City. An acquaintance wrote, "Things had been bad, there had been therapy, things had gotten better, guard had been let down". Her father has suggested that Woodman's suicide was related to an unsuccessful application for funding from the National Endowment for the Arts. A lackluster response to her photography and a failed relationship had pushed her into the deep depression.

== Works ==
=== Photographs, 1972–1980 ===
Although Woodman used different cameras and film formats during her career, most of her photographs were taken with medium format cameras producing 2 1/4 by 2 1/4-inch (6x6 cm) square negatives. Woodman created at least 10,000 negatives, which her parents kept. Woodman's estate, which was managed by Woodman's parents, consists of over 800 prints, of which only around 120 images had been published or exhibited as of 2006. Most of Woodman's prints are 8 by 10 inches (20 by 25 cm) or smaller, which "works to produce an intimate experience between viewer and photograph".

Many of Woodman's images are untitled and are known only by a location and date. She often took photographs indoors, finding abandoned and derelict spaces in which to create her photographic tableaux.

=== Videos, 1975–1978 ===
At RISD, Woodman borrowed a video camera and VTR and created videotapes related to her photographs in which she "methodically whitewashes her own naked body, for instance, or compares her torso to images of classical statuary." Some of these videos were displayed at the Helsinki City Art Museum in Finland and the Cisneros Fontanals Art Foundation in Miami in 2005; the Tate Modern in London in 2007–2008; and the San Francisco Museum of Modern Art in 2011.

=== Some Disordered Interior Geometries (1981 book) ===
Woodman created a number of artist's books, such as Portrait of a Reputation; Quaderno dei Dettati e dei Temi (Notebook of Dictations and Compositions); Quaderno (also known as Quaderno Raffaello); Portraits Friends Equasions; and Angels, Calendar Notebook. However, the only artist's book containing Woodman's photographs that was published during her lifetime was Some Disordered Interior Geometries. Released in January 1981 shortly before Woodman's death, it is 24 pages in length and is based upon selected pages from an Italian geometry exercise book. On the pages, Woodman had attached 16 photographs and had added handwriting and white correction fluid. A study of the book notes that Woodman occasionally re-drew a form "for emphasis or delight." A reproduction of the book's original spreads shows purple-pink covers, pages which vary slightly in color, and traces of pink on several pages. Although the published version of the book has purple-pink covers, the interior pages are printed using only black, white, and shades of gray.

In 1999, a critic was of the opinion that Some Disordered Interior Geometries was "a distinctively bizarre book… a seemingly deranged miasma of mathematical formulae, photographs of herself and scrawled, snaking, handwritten notes." An acquaintance of Woodman wrote in 2000 that it "was a very peculiar little book indeed," with "a strangely ironic distance between the soft intimacy of the bodies in the photographs and the angularity of the geometric rules that covered the pages." A 2006 essay described the book as "a three-way game that plays the text and illustrations for an introduction to Euclid against Woodman's own text and diagrams, as well as the 'geometry' of her formal compositions," while a 2008 article found the book "poetic and humorous, analytical and reflexive." A 2010 article on Woodman called the book "original and enigmatic," and a 2010 review stated of the book that "we are the richer for it." Claire Raymond argues that in Some Disordered Interior Geometries Woodman elliptically confronts the problem of the female artist's struggle to claim authority as an artist: by using a student textbook as her signal artist's book (the only book published during Woodman's lifetime) Woodman exposes the difficulty of the female artist moving beyond the role of neophyte/student.

A complete facsimile edition of all Woodman's artist's books was published in 2023.

== Posthumous recognition ==
=== Publications ===
Besides catalogues of her solo exhibitions, notable books by and about Woodman include:

==== Books of work by Woodman ====
- Francesca Woodman: Photographs 1975–1980. Marian Goodman, 2004. Exhibition catalogue.
- Francesca Woodman. Phaidon, 2006. Edited by Chris Townsend.
- Francesca Woodman's Notebook, which was released in 2011. It contains a facsimile of an Italian school exercise book to which Woodman added photographs, as well as an afterword by Woodman's father. This book, also known as Quaderno or Quaderno Raffaello, has been described as "both an urgent missive to a lover and a playful sexual summons."
- On Being an Angel Moderna Museet/König, 2015.
- Portrait of a Reputation. Rizzoli Electa, 2019. Photographs, notes, letters, postcards, and other ephemera. Accompanied an exhibition at MCA Denver, 2019–2020.
- Alternate Stories. Marian Goodman Gallery, 2021. Exhibition catalogue.
- The Artist's Books. MACK, 2023. Reproductions of all Woodman's artist's books.

==== Further Reading on Woodman ====
- Francesca Woodman and the Kantian sublime. Ashgate, 2010. A book examining the relevance of Woodman's photography as a way of understanding Kant's theory of the sublime.
- Francesca Woodman's Dark Gaze. Ashgate, 2016. By Claire Raymond. Woodman's diazotypes and other later works are examined.
- Harrison Adams, "Francesca Woodman: Water Specified," photographies 13, no. 3 (2020): 413-434.
- Rosalind Krauss, "Francesca Woodman: Problem Sets." In The Bachelors, 161-178. Cambridge: MIT Press, 1999.
- Abigail Solomon-Godeau, "Just Like a Woman." In Photography at the Dock: Essays on Photographic History, Institutions, and Practices, 238-255. Minneapolis: University of Minnesota Press, 1991.

=== Exhibitions ===
Front of dust jacket of 2006 book Francesca Woodman; photograph is Untitled, Providence, Rhode Island, 1976

Woodman had only a few exhibitions during her life, some of which have been described as "exhibitions in alternative spaces in New York and Rome." There were no known group or solo exhibitions of her work between 1981 and 1985, but numerous exhibitions each year since then. Among her major solo exhibitions were:

- 1978: Immagini. Libreria Maldoror, Roma.
- 1986–1989: Francesca Woodman, photographic work. Traveled to Hunter College Art Gallery, New York, NY; Wellesley College Museum, Wellesley, MA; University of Colorado Fine Arts Gallery, Boulder, CO; UCI Fine Arts Gallery, University of California, Irvine, CA; Institute of Contemporary Art, Philadelphia, and Krannert Art Museum, Champaign, IL.
- 1992–1993: Francesca Woodman, photographische arbeiten (photographic works). Traveled to Shedhalle, Zürich, Switzerland; Westfälischer Kunstverein, Münster, Germany; Kulturhuset, Stockholm, Sweden; Suomen Valokuvataiteen Museo SÄÄTIÖ, Helsinki, Finland; DAAD Galerie, Berlin, Germany; and Galleri F15 Alby, Moss, Norway.
- 1998: "l'artiste et la représentation de soi, Francesca Woodman", Rencontres d'Arles festival.
- 1998–2002: Francesca Woodman. Traveled to Fondation Cartier pour l'art contemporain, Paris, France; Kunsthal, Rotterdam, The Netherlands; Belém Cultural Center, Lisbon, Portugal; The Photographers' Gallery, London, United Kingdom; Centro Cultural Tecla Sala, L'Hospitalet, Barcelona, Spain; Carla Sozzani Gallery, Milan, Italy; The Douglas Hyde Gallery, Dublin, Ireland; and PhotoEspana, Centro Cultural Conde Duque, Madrid, Spain.
- 2000: Francesca Woodman: Providence, Roma, New York. Palazzo delle Esposizioni, Rome.
- 2009–2010: Francesca Woodman. Traveled to Espacio AV, Murcia, Spain; sms contemporanea, Siena, Italy; and Palazzo della Ragione, Milan, Italy.
- 2011–2012: Francesca Woodman. San Francisco Museum of Modern Art, San Francisco, CA; and Solomon R. Guggenheim Museum, New York, NY. Many had never been on display before.
- 2015–2017: On Being an Angel. Traveled to Moderna Museet, Stockholm; Foam Photography Museum, Amsterdam; Fondation Henri Cartier-Bresson, Paris; Moderna Museet, Malmo; Finnish Museum of Photography, Helsinki.
- 2019-2020: Francesca Woodman: Portrait of a Reputation. MCA Denver, Denver, CO.
- 2021: Francesca Woodman:Alternate Stories. Marian Goodman Gallery, New York, NY.
- 2024: Francesca Woodman and Julia Margaret Cameron: Portraits to Dream In, National Portrait Gallery, London, UK.
- 2025: Francesca Woodman Works from the Verbund Collection, Albertina Museum, Vienna.

=== The films The Fancy and The Woodmans ===
Poster for the 2011 film The Woodmans including part of "Polka Dots" photograph

In 2000, an experimental video The Fancy, by Elisabeth Subrin, examined Woodman's life and work, "pos[ing] questions about biographical form, history and fantasy, female subjectivity, and issues of authorship and intellectual property." Reviewers noted that the video juxtaposes "formalism, biography, and psychoanalysis" and "hints at conspiracy, calling attention to the Woodman family's unwillingness to make the bulk of her body of photography available…."

The Woodmans, a feature-length documentary, was released theatrically by Lorber Films on the thirtieth anniversary of her death, January 18, 2011. The director "had unrestricted access to all of Francesca’s photographs, private diaries, and experimental videos". Although the film won "Best New York Documentary" at the Tribeca Film Festival, Woodman's parents decided not to attend the premiere. Reactions to the film have been largely favorable. On the film review site Rotten Tomatoes, 94% of 17 critics' reviews were positive, and 83% of 793 user ratings were positive. It was broadcast on the PBS series Independent Lens on December 22, 2011.

=== Popular opinion ===
Public opinion has generally been favorable towards Woodman's work. At the 1998 exhibition in Paris, many people had "strong reactions" to her "interesting" photographs. A number of people have found Woodman's individual photos (for example "Self-portrait at 13") or her photography in general inspirational.

== Influences ==
Among other factors, critics and historians have written that Woodman was influenced by the following literary genre, myth, artistic movement, and photographers:

- Gothic fiction. She is reported to have identified with Victorian heroines. Many of the stories feature a female figure who is often forced into solitude, then turns mad. The Gothic style is full of symbols of tombs, mirrors, demons and angels.
- The myth of Apollo and Daphne, as evidenced by photographs in which Woodman is entangled in tree roots or wears birch bark on her arms.
- Surrealism. She studied surrealism immensely and studied the workings of Duane Michals. For example, Woodman "followed the movement's tradition of not explaining work" and demonstrated a "desire to crack the code of appearances."
- André Breton and in particular his Nadja of 1928. In a 1979 interview with Roberta Valtorta, Woodman is reported as saying "Vorrei che le parole avessero con le mie immagini lo stesso rapporto che le fotografie hanno con il testo in Nadja di André Breton" ("I would like words to have the same relationship with my images as the photographs have with the text in Nadja by André Breton". Translated by Dunhill.)
- Man Ray (e.g., a series of his photographs of Meret Oppenheim, and his surrealist works).
- Duane Michals. Woodman's and Michals's work share features such as blurring, angels, and handwriting in common.
- Deborah Turbeville. Woodman had "admired" Turbeville's work, and had compiled an artist's book for Turbeville (Quaderno Raffaello) which contained a written request for the older photographer to telephone her.
- Woodman was exposed to the symbolic work of Max Klinger whilst studying in Rome from 1977 to 1978 and his influence can clearly be seen in many photographic series’, such as Eel Series, Roma (1977–78) and Angel Series, Roma (1977). In combining performance, play and self-exposure, Woodman's photographs create extreme and often disturbing psychological states. In concealing or encrypting her subjects she reminds the viewer that photographs flatten and distort, never offering the whole truth about a subject.
- Woodman worked closely with her friend George Lange, another alumnus from Rhode Island School of Design. During a major exhibition held in honor of Woodman at the Museum of Contemporary Art, Denver, Director Nora Burnett stated “[They] made photographs together, they shared meals together, they experimented, explored and created together." A critic noted that this exhibition leaves out mention of her suicide. Instead of highlighting that event, which can dominate the discussion around her art output, this exhibition focuses on her early work, including playful and even ordinary moments from her life.
