= George Woodman =

American painter

George Edgar Woodman (April 27, 1932 – March 23, 2017) was an American ceramicist, painter, and photographer.

== Biography ==
Woodman went to Harvard University and married Betty Woodman (née Elizabeth Abrahams) in 1953.

After earning a master's degree in painting at the University of New Mexico, he taught painting and art criticism at the University of Colorado at Boulder until 1996. The Woodmans moved to New York in 1980 and had a second home in Italy, where they spent their summers.

The Woodmans' son, Charles, was born in 1955 and became Associate Professor of Electronic Art at the University of Cincinnati.

Their daughter was photographer Francesca Woodman; she was born in 1958 and died by suicide in 1981. Woodman selected some of his daughter's journal entries for publication in the book Francesca Woodman edited by Chris Townsend (Phaidon, 2006).

== Death ==
George Woodman died in his home in New York on March 23, 2017, aged 84.

== Ceramics ==
Until the early 1970s, George Woodman painted the ceramic work of Betty Woodman. His own ceramic art includes a 1984 tile mural at Delavan/Canisius University station on the Buffalo Metro Rail a 1991 tile mural Ode to the West Wind in the Temple Buell Theater in Denver, Colorado and a 2004 tile mural Path Games at the Detroit People Mover's Renaissance Center Station.

Path Games was a replacement for Dreamers and Voyagers Come to Detroit, a similar tile mural also created by Woodman in 1987 for the original Renaissance Center Station, which was demolished in 2002 to allow removal of the concrete berms in front of the building.

== Painting ==
From the 1950s to the 1980s, Woodman's artistic output consisted largely of colorful oil paintings on canvas. His earliest paintings in the 1950s to the early 1960s were landscapes.

In the early 1960s, he painted abstract works "with heavy, painterly brush strokes," but by the mid-1960s "the paint was applied thinly and evenly" in his abstracts. In the 1970s, as a mentor of the Colorado Criss-Cross artists' cooperative, Woodman was associated with the Pattern and Decoration movement. His paintings have been exhibited in at least two solo shows: "Sensuality in a World of Reason" in 1998 and "George Woodman: Paintings 1960-2000” in 2007.

== Photography ==
Since the early 1980s, Woodman has concentrated on black-and-white photography. The photographs in a 1991 New York exhibition were described as having an "antique, romantic air", with a "reliance on images from art history." In 1998, the Palazzo Pitti in Florence, Italy, displayed 78 of Woodman's "highly constructed" photographs that were "based on its own collection."

The 1998 exhibition "Sensuality in a World of Reason" included multiple-exposure photographs with overlapping human figures, buildings, and sculptures. A 2002 exhibition in Chennai, India, which was entitled "Truths and Fictions," included Woodman's photographs of photographs. His large-format, black-and-white, still life camera obscura photographs were exhibited in 2004; they involved techniques such as collage-like arrangements, long exposures with movement of objects, and combinations of positive and negative images.
