= Buffalo Niagara International Airport =

Airport in New York state, United States

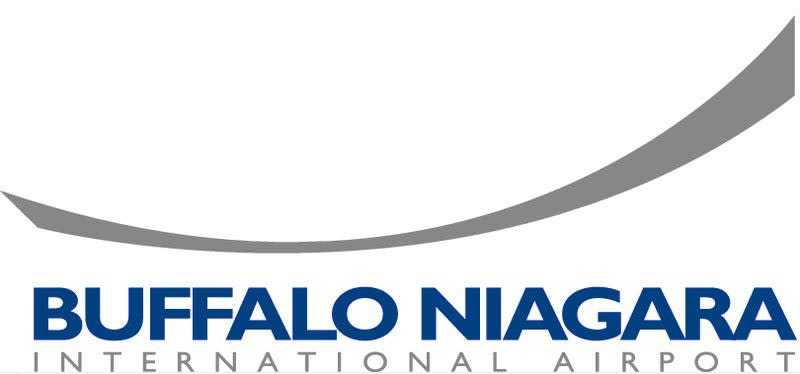

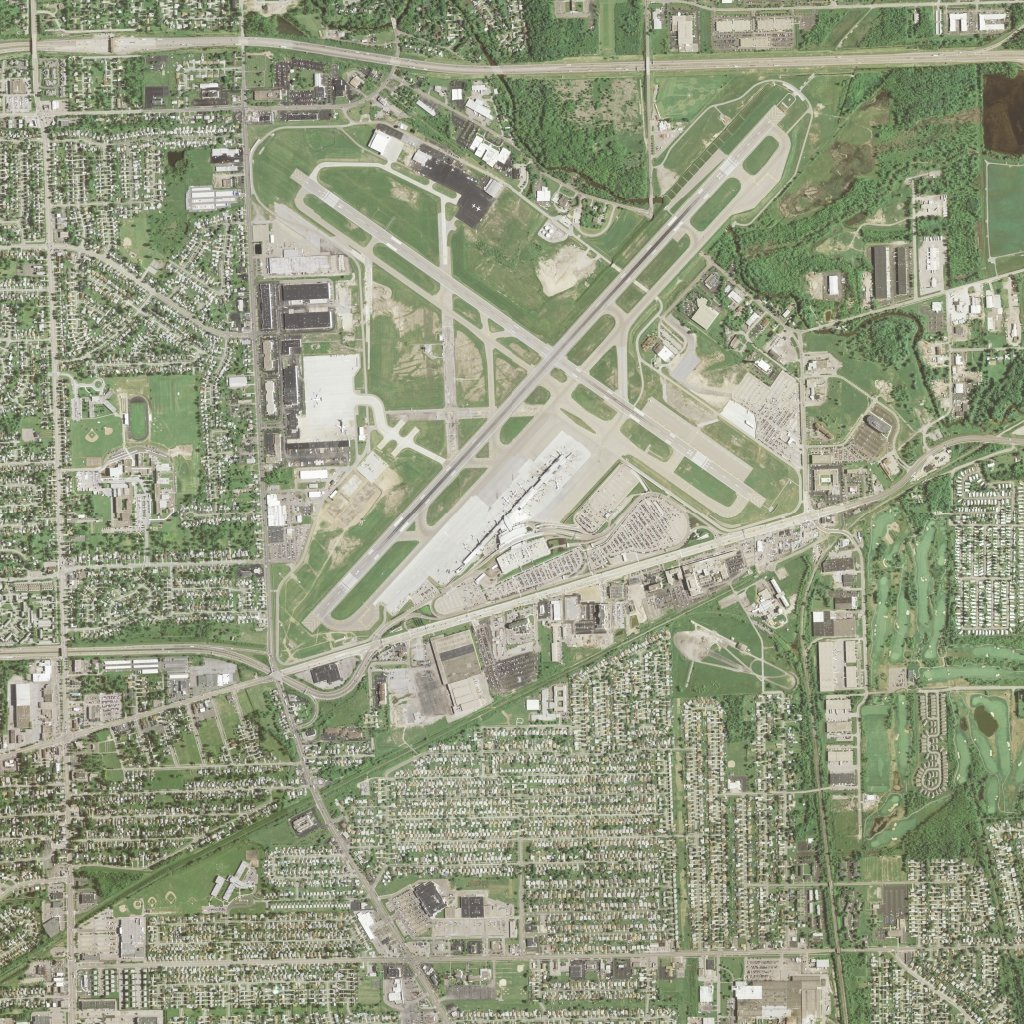
- USGS orthophoto
- IATA: BUF; ICAO: KBUF; FAA LID: BUF

Summary
- Airport type: Public
- Owner/Operator: Niagara Frontier Transportation Authority
- Serves: Buffalo–Niagara Falls metropolitan area Golden Horseshoe
- Location: 4200 Genesee Street; Cheektowaga, New York, U.S.
- Elevation AMSL: 717 ft (219 m)
- Coordinates: 42°56′26″N 078°43′56″W
- Website: www.buffaloairport.com

Maps
- Interactive map of Buffalo Niagara International Airport

Runways
Direction	Length		Surface
Direction	ft	m	Surface
05/23	8,829	2,691	Asphalt
14/32	7,161	2,183	Asphalt

Statistics (2025)
- Total passengers: 5,017,000 ▲
- Aircraft operations: 72,777
- Sources: Bureau of Transportation Statistics

Buffalo Niagara International Airport (IATA: BUF, ICAO: KBUF, FAA LID: BUF) is in Cheektowaga, New York, United States. The airport serves Buffalo, New York and Niagara Falls, New York in the United States, and the southern Golden Horseshoe region of Ontario, Canada. It is the third-busiest airport in the state of New York and the busiest inside of the Buffalo-Niagara Falls metropolitan area. The total catchment area for Buffalo Niagara International Airport (BUF) is estimated to be around 9.2 million people, the largest between NYC to the east and Chicago to the west, largely because it serves as a major, lower-cost alternative for travelers in the Southern Golden Horseshoe region of Ontario, Canada, in addition to Western New York. The combined US and Canada service area makes the Buffalo Niagara Region one of the top 10 largest urban regions in North America. It is about 11 miles (18 km) east of Downtown Buffalo and 60 miles (97 km) southeast of Toronto (although driving distance is 106 miles (171 km)). The airport covers a total area of 1,000 acres (400 ha).

== History ==
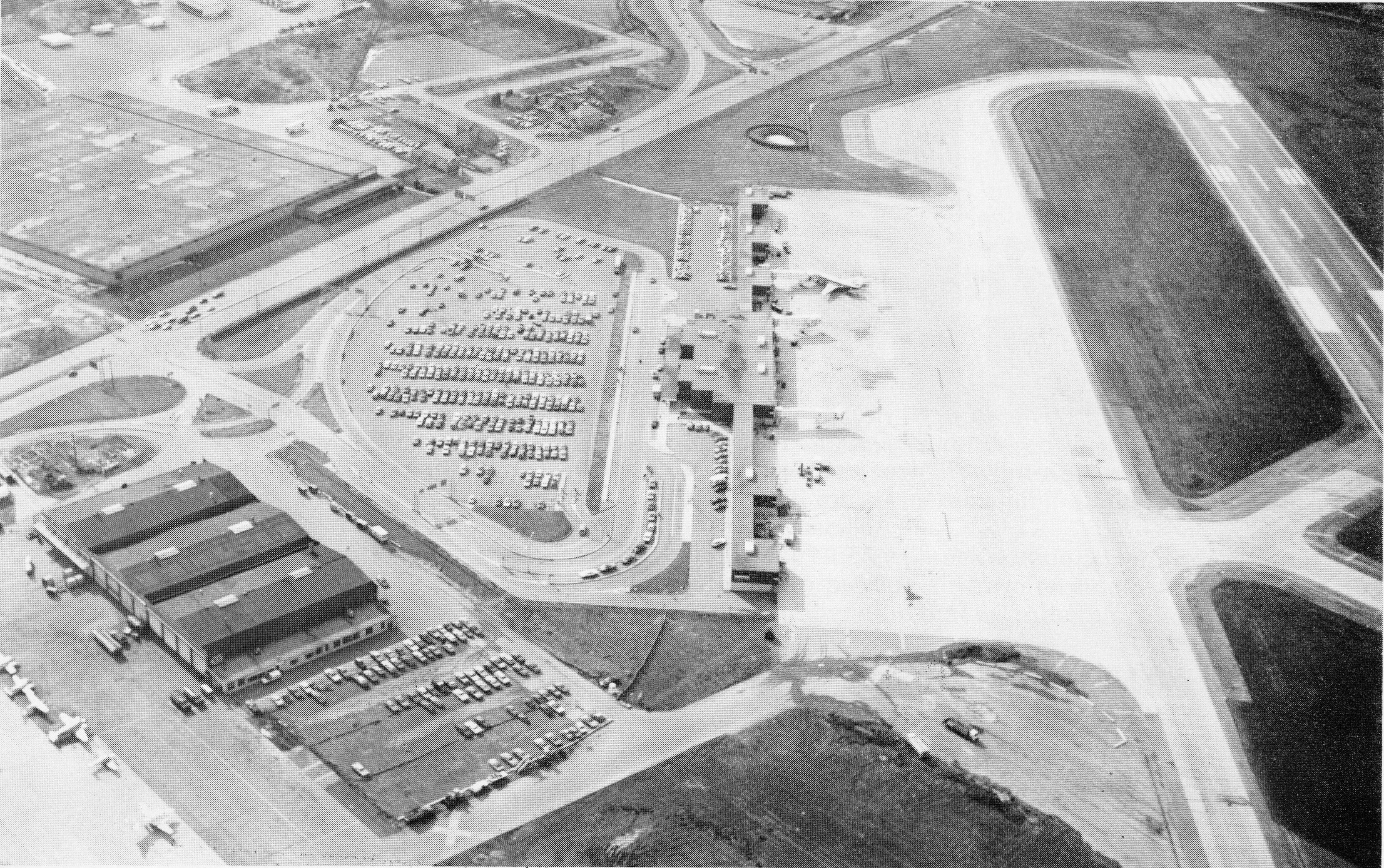
West terminal in 1974

Buffalo Niagara International Airport opened as Buffalo Municipal Airport in 1926 on former farmland, making it one of the country's oldest public airports. The original airport included a small terminal building, one hangar, and four cinder runways, each 3,000 feet (910 m) long by 100 feet (30 m) wide. Passenger and mail service began in December 1927, with service to Cleveland. A WPA-built Art Deco V-shaped terminal with a large cylindrical tower opened in 1939, replacing the original terminal. At this time, the airport had four paved runways: Runway 5/23 was 5,630 feet (1,720 m) long, Runway 13/31 (now 14/32) was 5,730 feet (1,750 m) long, Runway 1/19 was 5,000 feet (1,500 m) long, and Runway 8/26 was 3,650 feet (1,110 m) long. All of the runways were 150 feet (46 m) wide. Runways 1–19 and 8–26 were closed in the 1950s, and Runway 13–31 was renamed Runway 14–32.

The terminal's first expansion was completed in 1955. This addition expanded the terminal to 11 gates, tripled the terminal's square footage and added a restaurant and lounge. In 1959, the airport was acquired by the Niagara Frontier Transportation Authority from the City of Buffalo and renamed Greater Buffalo International Airport.

The terminal received another overhaul in 1961 that added a new control tower and a concourse for American Airlines. The first scheduled jet service was American Boeing 727 service to/from New York in 1965; Runway 5–23 was extended northeast from 5,645 feet (1,721 m) to 8,100 feet (2,500 m) later that year. In 1968, an auxiliary terminal building, West Terminal, was announced. Construction began in 1969 and it opened in 1971 with nine gates. During this time, an all-new airport to be located in Wheatfield, New York was in the planning stages and so the West Terminal was intended to have a ten-year life expectancy.

Despite the addition of the West Terminal, the 1939 terminal, now named East Terminal, received another expansion and renovation completed in 1973. New ticket lobbies were built for American Airlines and United Airlines, the original portion was turned into a baggage claim area and jetways were added for the first time. An expansion and renovation of West Terminal was announced in 1977 and completed in 1982. Two gates were added, the front of the terminal received a two-story addition, new ceilings were installed, and the original blue exterior was repainted gray. This configuration of the airport remained for the next fifteen years.

A large Curtiss-Wright plant once existed at the Airport. In 1940, the company broke ground on the plant on the southeast side of the airport and dedicated it in August 1941. The building was sold to Westinghouse in 1946 after the end of World War II. Westinghouse sold the facility to Buffalo developer Paul Snyder in 1985, who attempted to repurpose the building as the Buffalo Airport Center industrial park. This was not successful and the building was shuttered in 1991. After sitting vacant for nearly a decade, the facility was demolished in 1999 to allow Runway 14/32 to be lengthened. In 2006 the main runway was repaved and extended 750 feet (230 m), its first major upgrade since 1980 and the secondary runway was extended 1,000 feet (300 m).

In 2008 some local residents attempted to petition to rename the airport to "Buffalo Tim Russert International Airport" after Buffalo native and Meet the Press moderator Tim Russert after his sudden death; the honor instead went to a stretch of Route 20A/Big Tree Road passing south of Highmark Stadium, the home of his beloved Bills.

=== Current terminal ===
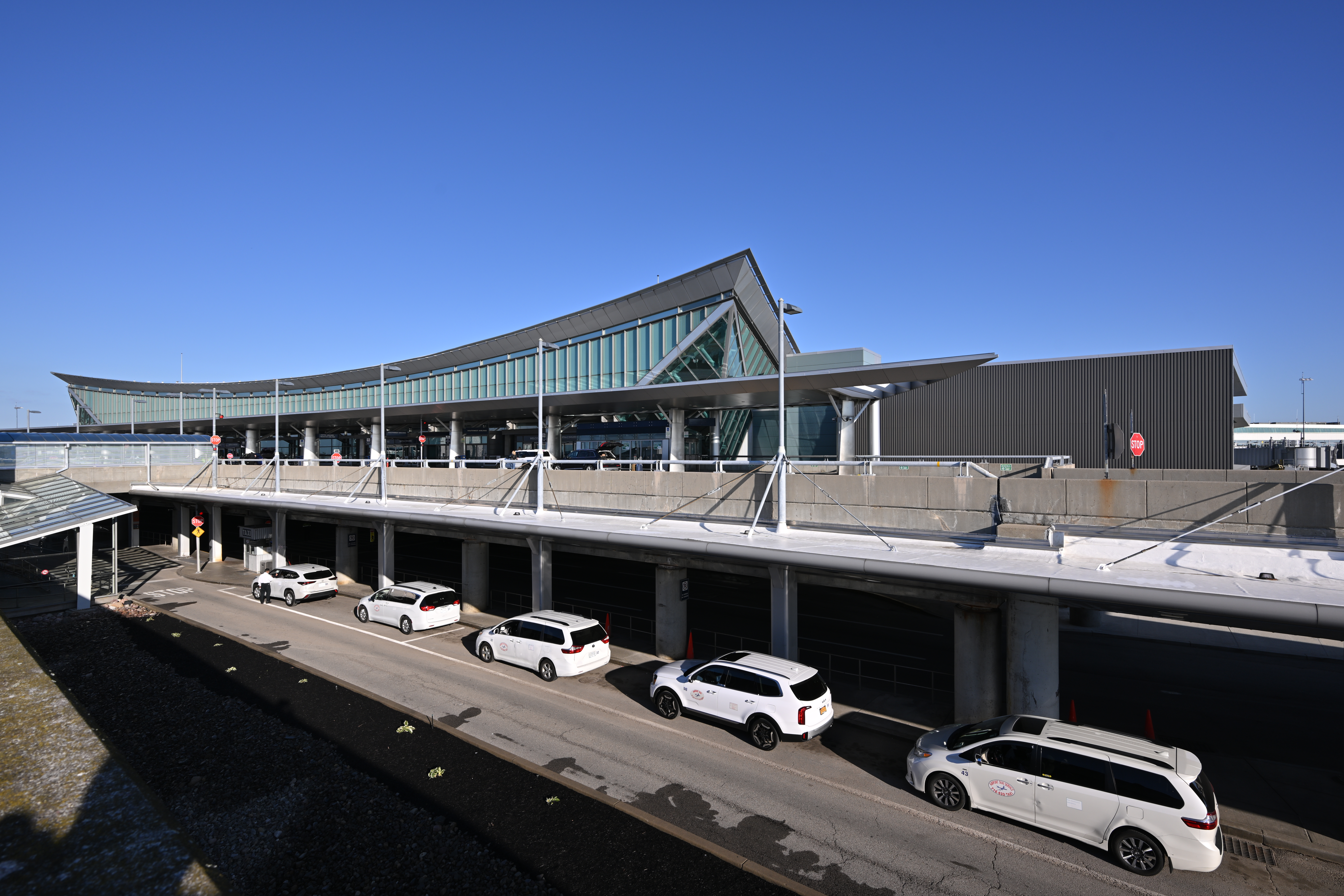
Buffalo Niagara Airport terminal exterior

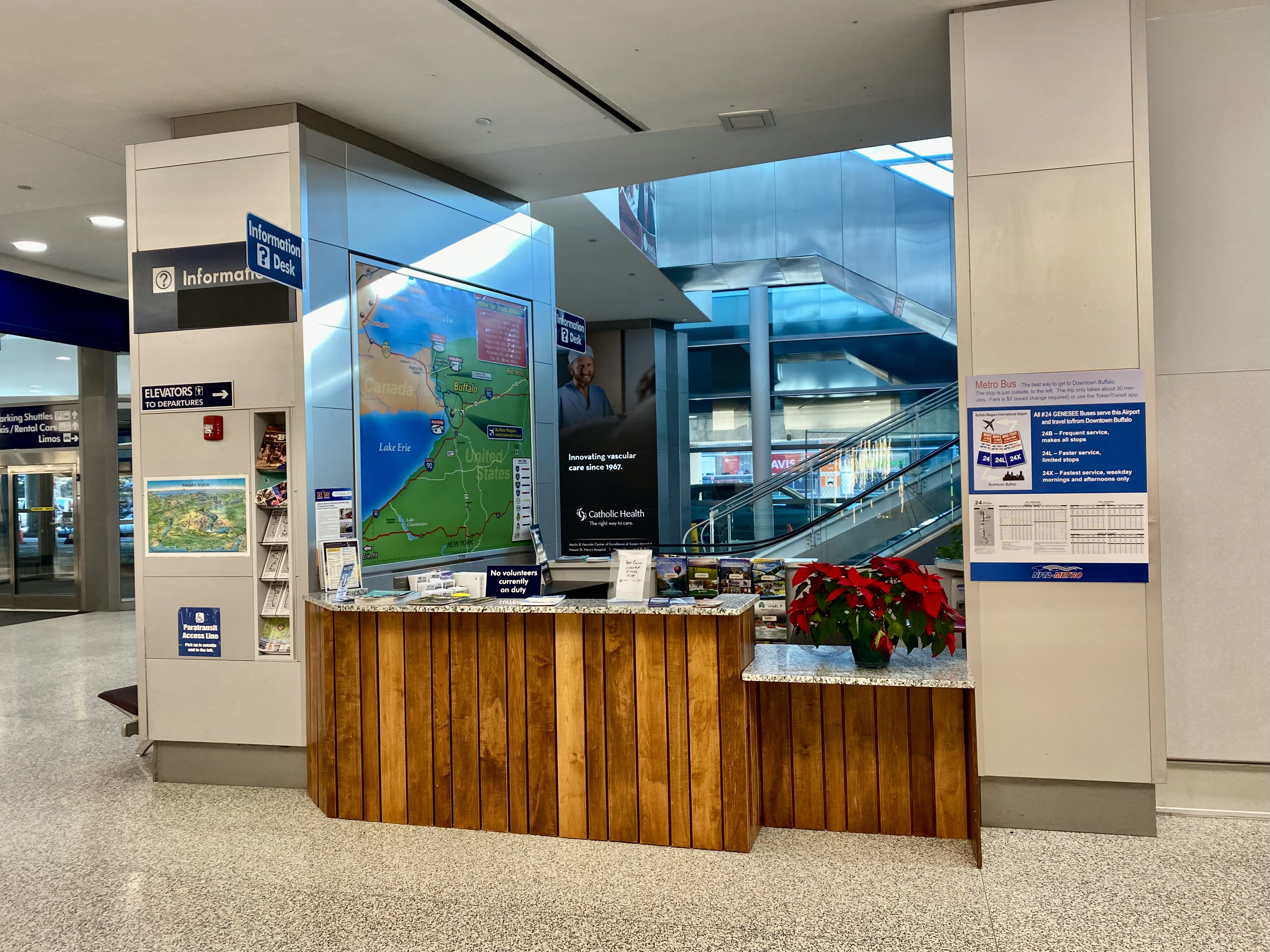
Tourist information desk

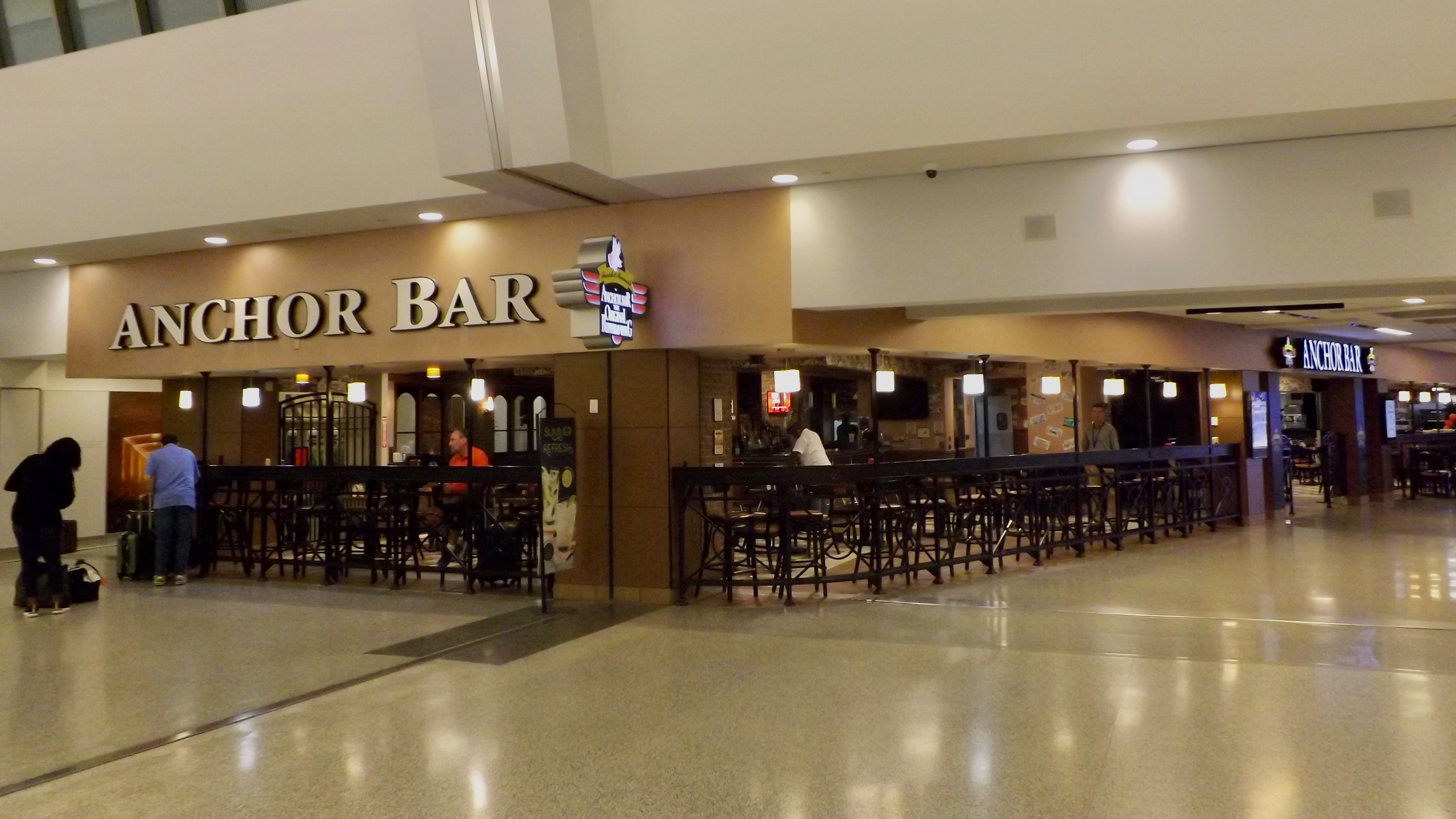
Anchor Bar

In 1991 it was decided a new terminal would make more sense than continued renovations. Construction of the new building designed by the Greater Buffalo International Airport (GBIA) Design Group, a joint venture composed of Kohn Pederson Fox Associates, CannonDesign, and William Nicholas Bodouva began in 1995 in between the two existing terminals.

The new $56 million terminal (at newly named Buffalo-Niagara International Airport) opened on November 3, 1997, with 15 gates. The old terminals were demolished immediately to allow expansion. The new building was expanded in 2001, increasing the number of gates to 24. The entire terminal has a total floor area of 462,256 square feet (42,945.0 m^{2}).

In late 2017 the terminal began an $80 million renovation and expansion with more than 54,000 square feet (5,000 m^{2}) of new space as part of the airport's 2013 master plan. The expansion will create secure walkways on the east and west side of the terminal for arriving passengers and relocate the central exit walkway to eliminate bottlenecks with departing passengers on the second floor. This will also create expanded curbside space for arriving and departing passengers. The renovation will also replace the baggage claim area's three flat plate baggage carousels with four sloped plate carousels, doubling the current capacity. Preparations began in December 2018, and groundbreaking and major construction began in February 2019. The renovations were completed in 2021. As part of the master plan, this expansion allows for the creation of a new pier south of the current east concourse.

== Infrastructure ==
=== Runways ===
Buffalo Niagara International Airport is at elevation 727 feet (222 m) and has two runways.

Number	Length	Width	ILS	Notes
5/23	8,829 feet (2,691 m)	150 feet (46 m)	Cat. I (both directions)	The main and longest runway at the airport, with Approach Lighting Systems (ALS) at each end.
14/32	7,161 feet (2,183 m)	150 feet (46 m)	Cat. I (32 only)	Runway 14 approach does not have ILS, nor ALS.

=== Emergency services ===
Buffalo Airport Fire Department responds to all fire and emergency medical aid calls in the terminal complex and adjacent property. The airport was formerly served by Buffalo Fire Department Engine 7 (crash-fire-rescue unit) until 1981 and was transferred to the Niagara Frontier Transportation Authority. A new $11 million fire station was completed in 2017. The facility is off of Amherst Villa Road. It is triple the size of the old station and includes a training facility and other amenities.

=== Other facilities ===
Signature Flight Support is the FBO for the airport. It provides private charter flights and other services, including fueling and ground handling, to many of the scheduled airlines that operate from the Buffalo-Niagara International Airport. It also provides aircraft maintenance service from its FAA approved repair station to airlines, corporate and general aviation customers. It is on the airport's north side. Prior to Tac Air taking over FBO operations in October 2020, Prior Aviation was the FBO.

=== Airspace ===
The airspace above Buffalo is prone to high flight traffic due to its proximity to Toronto Pearson International Airport, Billy Bishop Toronto City Airport and John C. Munro Hamilton International Airport. Most of these flights are inbound or outbound from destinations in the United States, Central America, the Caribbean and South America. Aircraft descending into the Toronto area use waypoints in Buffalo as part of a Standard Terminal Arrival Route (STAR) from the south. These aircraft are still well above 6,500 feet (2,000 m) and do not affect the air traffic of Buffalo.

== Service history ==
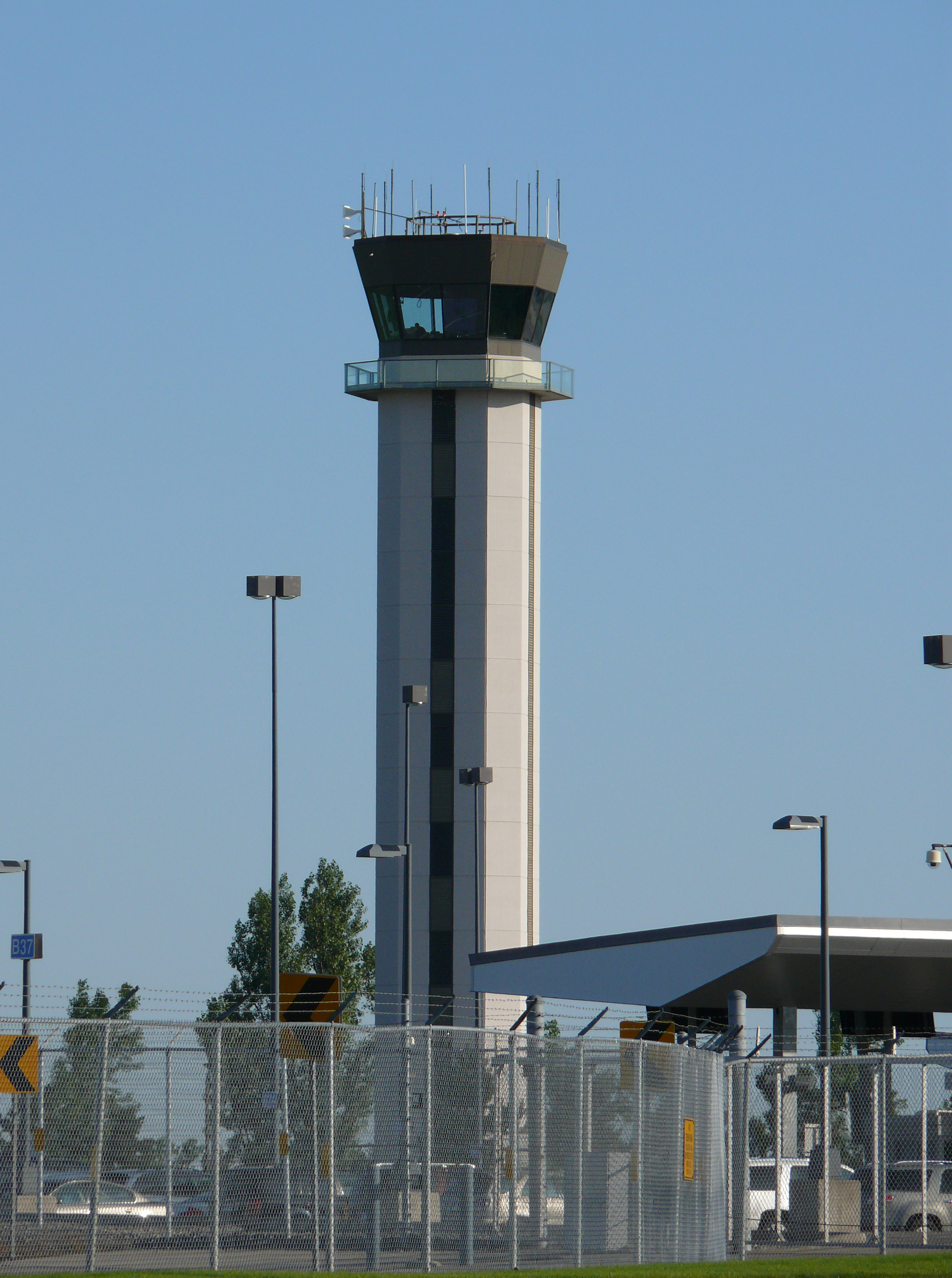
Buffalo Niagara control tower

The April 1957 OAG shows 96 weekday departures: 55 American, 28 Capital, 10 Mohawk and 3 Allegheny. Nonstop flights remained limited to Boston, New York, Pittsburgh and Chicago; Buffalo did not receive a nonstop beyond Chicago until Mohawk started a Minneapolis route in 1970. Continental tried Denver service for a few months in 1987–88. American attempted direct service to DFW multiple times, and Northwest started Minneapolis in 1987. Southwest expanded the footprint in October 2000 with service to Phoenix and Las Vegas.

When the federal government deregulated the airlines in 1978, Buffalo was served by four airlines: three "trunk carriers" (American Airlines, United Airlines, Eastern Air Lines) and one "local service carrier" (Allegheny Airlines). American and United used the East Terminal, while Allegheny and Eastern occupied the West Terminal.

During the "glory years" for mainline-sized jet service at U.S. medium-size airports in the 1970s and 1980s, Buffalo regularly hosted widebody passenger jets. American Airlines DC-10s flew to Chicago O'Hare International Airport and other points. Eastern Air Lines Lockheed L-1011s and Airbus A300s flew to Hartsfield–Jackson Atlanta International Airport. Eastern's flights often did 'tag-on' hops to Toronto Pearson International Airport due to legal restrictions on flights between the United States and Canada. Buffalo still hosts many mainline passenger jets, but scheduled flights are usually narrow-body (single-aisle) aircraft. Today, Buffalo hosts wide-body charter flights for the Buffalo Bills or their National Football League opponents.

Shortly after deregulation of the U.S. airline industry, American and United began reducing service at medium-sized Northeastern markets such as Buffalo. Many other airlines entered the Buffalo market and the 1980s saw a riot of new airline service as the industry began to take its post-deregulation shape. Most of these carriers did not survive the decade.

The most prominent new carrier at Buffalo was People Express Airlines, a low-fare carrier founded in 1981 with a hub at Newark International Airport. Buffalo, along with Norfolk, Virginia and Columbus, Ohio was one of the original three cities served by People from Newark. The airline grew rapidly into a major carrier and at its peak ran over 10 flights per day from Buffalo to Newark. Too-rapid growth including a purchase of the original Frontier Airlines led to People's demise in 1987. They were bought and assimilated by Continental Airlines.

Other carriers at Buffalo included:

- Trans World Airlines (TWA), which served Buffalo around 1979–1981 during a short-lived hub in Pittsburgh.
- Republic Airlines, a Minneapolis-based carrier that ran flights from Buffalo to its hub at Detroit Metropolitan Wayne County Airport starting in 1984 and that was bought by Northwest Airlines in 1986.
- Empire Airlines, a regional carrier based in Utica that built a hub at Syracuse Hancock International Airport after deregulation and ran regional jet and turboprop flights in the Northeast.
- Mall Airways, a small regional carrier based at Albany International Airport, operated flights from Buffalo to their Albany hub in the mid-1980s.
- Piedmont Airlines, a pre-deregulation local service carrier from North Carolina that built a hub at Baltimore/Washington International Airport after deregulation and ran flights to the Northeast, Southeast, and Florida, and was bought by USAir in 1987 and merged into them in 1989.
- Independence Air, a low-cost carrier serving primarily the East Coast, operated eight flights daily from Buffalo to their hub at Dulles International Airport from July 2004 until it ceased operations in January 2006.

In 1986–1987 the US airline industry went through a series of buyouts and mergers, and by the end of 1989 most domestic air service in the US was provided by six "legacy carriers." At the end of the 1980s, airlines at Buffalo were mostly this six and their regional affiliates: American, United, Continental, USAir, Northwest and Delta Air Lines. During the 1990s, with People Express swallowed by Continental, these carriers kept fares high and enplanements stagnant at Buffalo.

=== Low fare service ===
At the beginning of the 21st century, Buffalo Niagara International Airport grew with the addition of low-cost carriers Southwest and JetBlue. Due to the "Southwest Effect", Buffalo Niagara International Airport exceeded the 5 million passenger mark in 2006. Previous estimates by the NFTA had projected 3.8 million passengers for 2006, and it would be 2020 before the 5 million passenger plateau would be reached. Buffalo is the largest airport by passenger traffic in Upstate New York and now averages 4.5–5.5 million passengers per year. Another addition to the low cost carriers was Frontier, which began service from Buffalo in 2017.

=== Canadian travelers ===
The proximity of Buffalo Niagara International Airport to the 9.2 million residents of the Golden Horseshoe region (which includes the metropolitan areas of Greater Toronto and Hamilton) in Ontario makes it a very popular airport for Canadians traveling to U.S. destinations. Despite the existence of four international airports in the region that provide cross-border flights (Toronto-Pearson, Toronto-Billy Bishop, Hamilton and Kitchener-Waterloo), one in three passengers utilizing Buffalo are from Canada and in 2012, 47 percent of all passengers were from Canada. This is due to air fares for US-bound Canadian flights being generally higher due to added customs and immigration surcharges, the value difference of Canadian and U.S. currency, and other taxes and fees. Several passenger shuttle services operate from the airport to cities in Southern Ontario, and to Toronto-Pearson and Hamilton airports.

Due to past U.S. COVID-19 pandemic travel restrictions that required COVID-19 testing for international arrivals via air travel, Toronto-based professional sports teams were similarly using the airport as a travel hub, having their players transported by bus from Toronto since land crossings and domestic flights were not subject to testing.

== Airlines and destinations ==
On average there are over 100 flights per day, with nonstop service to 35 airports across the United States and Puerto Rico. Seasonally, the airport offers international flights to the Dominican Republic and Mexico.

=== Passenger ===
Airlines	Destinations
American Airlines	Charlotte, Dallas/Fort Worth; Seasonal: Chicago–O'Hare
American Eagle	Boston, Chicago–O'Hare, New York–LaGuardia, Philadelphia, Washington–National; Seasonal: Miami
Breeze Airways	Charleston (SC) (begins July 2, 2027), Myrtle Beach (begins July 1, 2027), Raleigh/Durham (begins June 29, 2027)
Delta Air Lines	Atlanta, Detroit; Seasonal: Minneapolis/St. Paul
Delta Connection	Detroit, New York–JFK, New York–LaGuardia
Frontier Airlines	Atlanta, Orlando, Tampa; Seasonal: Raleigh/Durham
JetBlue	Boston, Fort Lauderdale, Fort Myers, New York–JFK, Orlando, San Juan; Seasonal: Los Angeles
Southwest Airlines	Baltimore, Chicago–Midway, Las Vegas, Miami (begins February 13, 2027), Nashville, Orlando, Tampa; Seasonal: Dallas–Love, Denver, Fort Lauderdale, Fort Myers, Phoenix–Sky Harbor, Sarasota, West Palm Beach (begins January 9, 2027)
United Airlines	Chicago–O'Hare, Denver, Newark
United Express	Chicago–O'Hare, Newark, Washington–Dulles

Domestic destinations map
All domestic destinations from Buffalo Niagara International Airport (BUF).

• Red represents year-round destinations.
• Green represents seasonal destinations.

• Blue represents future destinations.

=== Cargo ===
Airlines	Destinations
Ameriflight	Binghamton, Elmira, Plattsburgh
FedEx Express	Indianapolis, Memphis, Ottawa, Syracuse
UPS Airlines	Hartford, Louisville, Philadelphia, Raleigh/Durham, Syracuse

Cargo destinations map
All cargo destinations from Buffalo Niagara International Airport (BUF)

== Statistics ==
=== Total passengers ===
Year	Total passengers	% change
2002	3,716,000	Steady
2003	4,013,000	▲7.99%
2004	4,348,000	▲8.35%
2005	4,804,000	▲10.49%
2006	4,983,000	▲3.73%
2007	5,405,000	▲8.47%
2008	5,461,000	▲1.04%
2009	5,278,000	▼3.35%
2010	5,194,000	▼1.59%
2011	5,110,000	▼1.62%
2012	5,145,000	▲0.68%
2013	5,101,000	▼0.86%
2014	4,720,000	▼7.47%
2015	4,643,000	▼1.63%
2016	4,606,000	▼0.79%
2017	4,670,000	▲1.39%
2018	5,015,000	▲7.39%
2019	4,892,000	▼2.45%
2020	1,395,000	▼71.48%
2021	2,896,000	▲107.59%
2022	3,983,000	▲37.53%
2023	4,556,000	▲14.39%
2024	4,961,000	▲8.89%
2025	5,017,000	▲1.13%

^Sharp decrease in traffic caused by the COVID-19 pandemic

=== Top destinations ===
Busiest domestic routes from BUF (January 2025 - December 2025)
Rank	City	Passengers	Carriers
1	Orlando, Florida	272,130	Frontier, JetBlue, Southwest
2	(New York (state)) New York–JFK, New York	230,260	Delta, JetBlue
3	(Georgia (U.S. state)) Atlanta, Georgia	202,630	Delta, Frontier
4	Baltimore, Maryland	200,190	Southwest
5	Chicago–O'Hare, Illinois	195,580	American, United
6	Charlotte, North Carolina	166,460	American, Frontier
7	(New York (state)) New York–LaGuardia, New York	131,700	American, Delta
8	Detroit, Michigan	112,110	Delta
9	Tampa, Florida	106,400	Frontier, Southwest
10	Boston, Massachusetts	95,490	JetBlue

=== Airline market share ===
Largest airlines at BUF (November 2024 - October 2025)
Rank	Carrier	Percentage	Passengers
1	Southwest Airlines	28.01%	1,414,000
2	JetBlue	16.89%	853,000
3	American Airlines	10.51%	531,000
4	Delta Air Lines	9.51%	480,000
5	Frontier Airlines	6.75%	341,000
-	Other	28.34%	1,431,000

== Ground transportation ==
=== Car ===
The airport is served by the Kensington Expressway (NY Route 33), which ends at the airport. Route 33 intersects with the New York State Thruway, Interstate I-90, about 1 mi (1.6 km) from the airport and then continues directly into downtown Buffalo with a total drive time of approximately 10–15 minutes.

=== Bus ===
Niagara Frontier Transportation Authority provides service on routes 24B (Genesee), 47 (Youngs Road), 68 (George Urban Express) and 204 (Airport-Downtown Express). NFTA Metro Paratransit offers services to the airport for people with mobility issues, but pre-booking is required.

Greyhound Bus Lines also provides transportation to and from the airport, with services to Toronto and New York City, (dropping off at 34th and 11th avenues).

=== Car rental and taxi ===
Many national car rental companies have rental facilities on airport property. Alamo, Avis, Budget, Dollar, Enterprise, Hertz and National all are onsite. Various limos, taxis, and shuttle buses have access to and from the airport.

== Accidents and incidents ==
- September 11, 1942 – A Curtiss P-40 Warhawk crashed into the Curtiss-Wright Plant 2 building on the corner of Genesee Street and Sugg Road (Holtz Road) in Cheektowaga. The plane entered the roof of the building landing near the tool crib, trapping several employees. 14 deaths and 33 injuries were reported along with many acts of heroism by employees. The plane was reported to have been at 15,000 feet (4,600 m) when fire started to consume the cockpit. The pilot tried in vain to save the plane but was forced to parachute to safety, landing near Walden Avenue and Union Road. The plane plunged to earth, landing back near the airport. It is said that the impact was so great that the engine was planted into the cement floor of the factory. A marker can be found in the Long Term parking lot of Buffalo Niagara International Airport.
- January 21, 1954: American Airlines Flight 767, a Convair CV-240, crashed soon after taking off from Buffalo Niagara International Airport. The left engine failed, causing the pilot to attempt a return to the airport. A successful wheels up landing was made southeast of the airport 200 yards (180 m) south of 2478 George Urban Blvd. in Depew. No deaths and few injuries were reported.
- On August 2, 1958 – A Blue Angels jet flown by Lt. John R. Dewenter landed, wheels up at Buffalo Niagara International Airport after experiencing engine troubles during a show in Clarence. The Grumman F-11 Tiger landed on Runway 23 but exited airport property, coming to rest in the intersection of Genesee Street and Dick Road, nearly hitting a gas station. Lt. Dewenter was uninjured and the plane was a total loss.
- On December 16, 1972, a private Cessna 421 crashed into the homes at 116 and 121 Diane Drive in Cheektowaga near the airport. The crash killed three on board and three on the ground, and at least four people on the ground were injured.
- July 20, 1977 - A mail plane operated by Corporate Air and bound for Rochester crashed through the roof of the Westinghouse Electric Corp. plant in Cheektowaga, killing the pilot and critically injuring a plant employee. The pilot of the plane, identified by officials as Eugene Snyder, was taken to St. Joseph Intercommunity Hospital in Cheektowaga, where he died shortly before 12:30 am.
- February 18, 1998 – A twin engine Beechcraft chartered by Lt. Governor Betsy McCaughey Ross, a candidate for governor, carrying McCaughey Ross and three staff, crashed on take-off, with minor injuries. An FAA investigation determined that soggy conditions at the airport likely prevented the aircraft from catching fire.
- February 12, 2009 – Colgan Air Flight 3407, a Bombardier Dash 8 Q400 operating under contract with Continental Connection, crashed into a home on Long Street in Clarence Center. The flight from Newark Liberty International Airport was only approximately 6 mi (9.7 km) away from the airport when it crashed. All 49 passengers and crew members on board the aircraft died in the incident, along with one person on the ground. Two others who were in the home at the time of the accident escaped alive. Minutes before the accident, the crew had reported "significant ice buildup" on the wings and the windshield, and an NTSB official said that the aircraft had experienced "severe pitch-and-roll excursions" 40 seconds prior to the crash. This was the first fatal accident of an airliner on US soil in almost three years after the crash of Comair Flight 5191. The crash was attributed to an aerodynamic stall caused by the crew's failure to monitor their airspeed.
- August 14, 2014 – N706GS, a 2013 Piper PA-28, crashed upon takeoff from runway 23. The short flight reached an altitude of 200–300 feet before landing on BNIA property and ending up in a premium parking lot southwest of the terminal. The occupants, Bing Shen, 39; his six-year-old son; and the pilot, certified flight instructor Anastasiia Goldowsky, were treated and released from Erie County Medical Center. The flight was a plane for hire scheduled for an afternoon of sightseeing.
- April 22, 2015 – SkyWest Airlines Flight 5622, en route from O'Hare International Airport in Chicago to Bradley International Airport in Hartford, made an emergency landing after one passenger reportedly lost consciousness.
- June 8, 2015 – Mesa Airlines Flight 3796, a Canadair Regional Jet CRJ-700, operated by United Express, skidded off of Runway 32 into a grass area, due to high winds. The plane departed from Dulles International Airport. There were no injuries.
- February 13, 2019 – United Airlines Flight 1442 to Newark Liberty International Airport struck a passenger jet bridge at Gate 9 while taxiing for takeoff. Strong winds and blowing snow were reported as the cause. There were no injuries among the 158 passengers on board.
- October 2, 2020 — A Socata TBM-850 en route to Buffalo, Niagara from Manchester-Boston crashed near Corfu, New York, after suffering radio failures in the aircraft from Boston Center. The aircraft crashed 17 miles east from the destination airport after beginning its initial descent. Both occupants were fatally injured.

== See also ==
- New York World War II Army Airfields
