= Betty Woodman =

American ceramic artist

- Woodman, 1973
- Born: Elizabeth Abrahams; May 14, 1930
- Died: January 2, 2018 (aged 87)
- Education: School for American Craftsmen (Alfred University)
- Alma mater: Alfred University
- Known for: Pottery

Elizabeth Woodman (née Abrahams; May 14, 1930 – January 2, 2018) was an American ceramic artist.

== Early life and education ==
Betty Woodman was born in Norwalk, Connecticut, raised by Minnie and Henry Abrahams in Newton, Massachusetts, and studied ceramics at the School for American Craftsmen in Alfred, New York from 1948–1950. Her parents were progressive socialists and her mother promoted a feminist viewpoint. During seventh grade, stifled by the home economics courses to which young women were relegated at the time, she successfully fought her way into a woodshop class, wherein she learned to use a lathe. Betty started pottery classes at age 16 and immediately took to clay. She attended the School for American Craftsmen at Alfred University in New York from 1948 until 1950.. She began her career in the 1950s as a production potter and then later became a studio potter. Woodman worked in light-filled studios. One in Boulder, Colorado, and another in New York City. Her workspace environment was described as energetic, and vibrant which was much like her pieces.

== Career ==
Woodman began her career in the 1950s as a production potter. Her career moved from functional pottery to fresh and exuberant art culminating in a retrospective show at the Metropolitan Museum of Art in New York in 2006, the first such retrospective for a living, female ceramicist, and a solo show at the Institute of Contemporary Arts in London in 2016 with the title Theatre of the Domestic. She was a professor of art at the University of Colorado at Boulder from 1978 to 1998. Following her daughter's death in 1981, Woodman's work subsequently shifted, evolving from functional pottery to the more abstract, thus transforming her career. She received an honorary doctorate from CU in 2007. Woodman convinced city of Boulder officials in the 1950s to fund the Pottery Lab, making it one of the first recreational pottery programs in the U.S. Her vision was to have students make pottery for fun but also develop their craft into a career. The Pottery Lab's creation resulted in around 100 kilns being constructed in the Boulder area.

=== Artistic Background ===
Woodman had worked with different forms of pottery techniques which included making baskets, dinnerware, pillow forms, pitchers, and vases. Woodman created a radical vision of how ceramics could function in contemporary art context. Woodman was known for exploring vessel forms in her sculptures. Woodman explored the “vessel” as a metaphor, blurring the lines between craft, sculpture, and painting. Woodman’s work was also influenced by memories of her paintings, landscape, and architecture from her travels. “In 1951, Woodman traveled to Italy for the first time, alone, having worked to save money for the year-long trip. At the invitation of friends, she found her way to Fiesole, outside Florence, and began working in a pottery studio established by painter Giorgio Ferrero and sculptor Lionello Fallacara. It was through these two artists that Woodman first realized that the accepted rules of pottery need not be followed. And it was there that she was introduced to the colorful, folk-oriented traditions of Italian ceramics, which stood in stark contrast to the more restrained approaches predominantly practiced in the United States at the time.” Woodman was inspired by a wide range of influences that included Greek, ancient Etruscan, Japanese ceramics, Italian maiolica, and Roman pottery. During her career she returned to the vase form, repeatedly deconstructing and reconstructing the form in her sculptures. Woodman most often used earthenware clay for ceramic work and vibrant, colorful glazes.

== Family ==
Betty Woodman met George Woodman in a pottery class she was teaching in Boston in 1950. They married in 1953. George Woodman was a painter and photographer. He headed the University of Colorado Boulder art department. He died in March 2017. Betty and George Woodman had two children. Their daughter, Francesca Woodman, was a photographer who died by suicide in 1981 at age 22. Their son, Charles Woodman, is an artist.

== Awards and honors ==
Woodman's awards and honors include:

- National Endowment for the Arts Fellowships (1980,1986)
- Rockefeller Foundation Fellowship at the Bellagio Study Center, Bellagio, Italy (1995)
- Fulbright-Hays Scholarship to Florence, Italy (1996)
- Doctor of Fine Arts Honors Causa from the Nova Scotia College of Art and Design (2006)
- Doctor of Human Letters Honoris Causa from the University of Colorado Boulder (2007)
- Honorary Doctorate of Fine Arts from the Rhode Island School of Design (2009)
- International Artist Award (with George Woodman) from Anderson Ranch Arts Center (2010)
- Gold Medal for Consummate Craftmanship, American Craft Council Awards (2014)

== Exhibitions ==
Woodman exhibited at museums and galleries in the US and internationally, including:

- 'Betty Woodman' at the Stedelijk Museum, Amsterdam (1996)
- 'Betty Woodman' at the Daum Museum of Contemporary Art, Sedalia, MO (2002)
- 'Theaters of Betty Woodman' at the Museu Nacional do Azulejo, Lisbon (2005) and the Musée Ariana, Geneva (2006)
- 'The Art of Betty Woodman' a retrospective exhibition of her career at the Metropolitan Museum of Art, New York (2006)
- 'Betty Woodman: Roman Fresco/Pleasures and Places' first exhibited at the American Academy in Rome (2010)
- 'Betty Woodman: Theatre of the Domestic' at the Institute of Contemporary Arts in London, 2016

== Collections ==
Woodman's work is included in public collections, including:

- Museum of Fine Arts, Boston
- Pérez Art Museum Miami, Florida. Aztec Vase 7 (2007)
- Denver Art Museum, Denver, CO
- Metropolitan Museum of Art, New York
- Musée des Arts Décoratifs, Paris
- Museum of Modern Art, New York
- Whitney Museum of American Art, New York
- National Gallery of Art, Washington D.C.
- Philadelphia Museum of Art, Philadelphia, PA
- Victoria and Albert Museum, London
- Minneapolis Institute of Art
- Smithsonian American Art Museum (SAAM) Pillow Pitcher was acquired by SAAM as part of the Renwick Gallery's 50th Anniversary Campaign.

== Other contributions ==
In the 1991 documentary Thinking Out Loud, Woodman is interviewed by curator and painter John Perreault. In 2006 the monograph, Betty Woodman, was produced in conjunction with her retrospective at the Metropolitan Museum of Art, and it includes curatorial essays by Janet Koplos, Barry Schwabsky, and Arthur Danto.
