= Utica station (Buffalo Metro Rail) =

Light rail station in Buffalo, New York

Utica
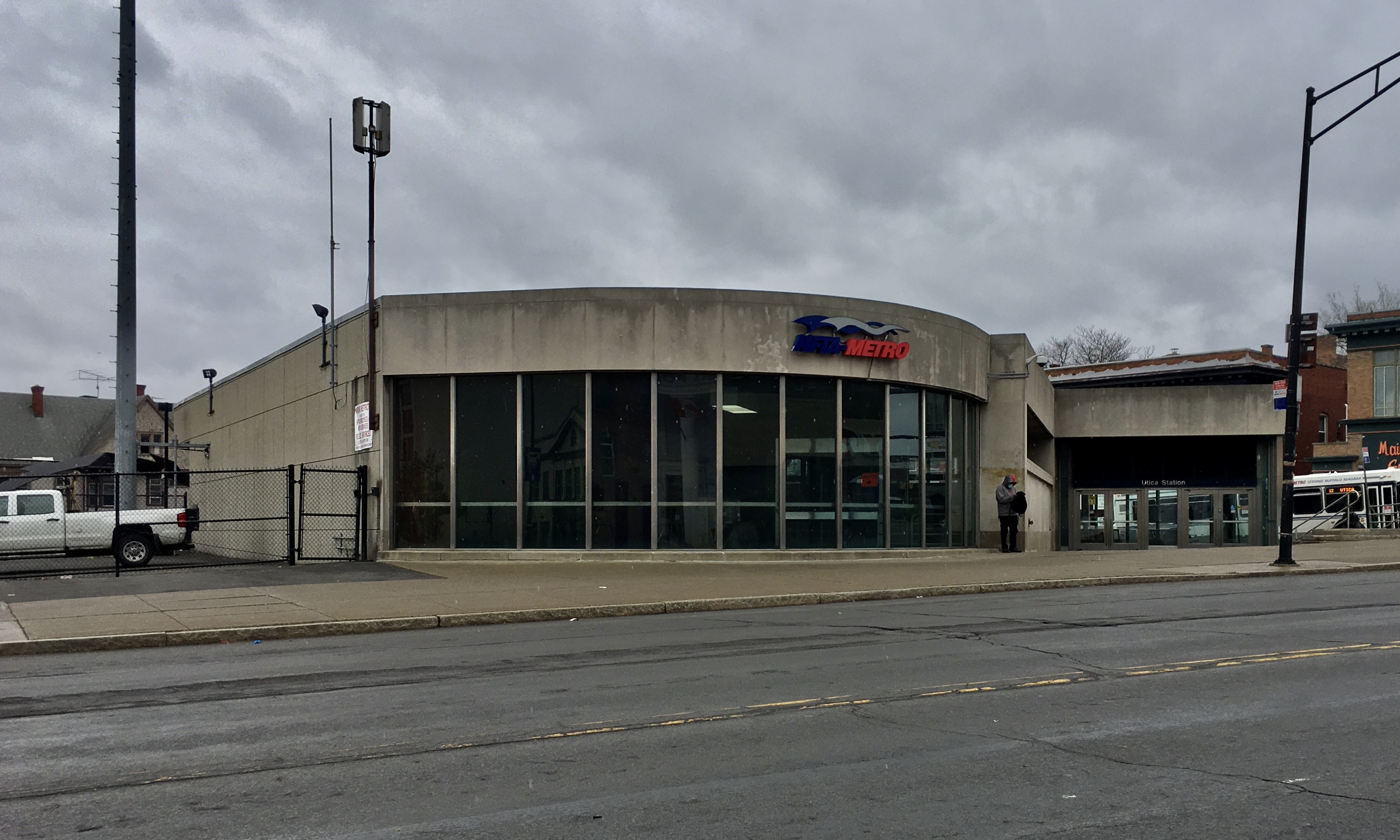
- Utica station in May 2020

General information
- Location: 1375 Main Street; Buffalo, New York
- Coordinates: 42.911272°N 78.865893°W
- Owner: NFTA
- Platforms: 2 side platforms
- Tracks: 2

Construction
- Structure type: Underground
- Depth: 40 feet (12 m)

Other information
- Fare zone: Paid fare

History
- Opened: May 18, 1985; 41 years ago

Passengers
- 2017: 439,865

Services
Preceding station	NFTA	Following station
Delavan/Canisius University toward University	Metro Rail	Summer–Best toward DL&W
Location

Utica station is a Buffalo Metro Rail station located at the corner of Main and East Utica Streets. The station was formerly known at the shortened "Utica" name until December 29, 2021, when it was named as the Robert Traynham Coles Utica Station, named after a deceased architect that worked in the design of the Utica station.

== Bus routes ==
Utica station is one of four stations that offers a bus loop, requiring passengers to board/debark using curbside stops (the other three being University, LaSalle and Delavan/Canisius College) and one of only two that has a driveway for bus lines that connect with Metro Rail (the other being Delavan/Canisius College). Route 8 buses heading toward Marine Drive do not board at the curb on the same side as the station, which is served by three bus routes:

Boarding from Bus Loop:

- 12 Utica (outbound)
- 13 Kensington (outbound)

Boarding on Main Street:

- 8 Main

Boarding on East Utica Street:

- 12 Utica (inbound)

== Artwork ==
In 1979, an art selection committee was created, composed of NFTA commissioners and Buffalo area art experts, that would judge the artwork that would be displayed in and on the properties of eight stations on the Metro Rail line. Out of the 70 proposals submitted, 22 were chosen and are currently positioned inside and outside of the eight underground stations. Utica is home of three pieces of work, from Margie Hughto (Syracuse), George Smith (Houston) and Craig Langager (New York City). Margie Hughto offers a heavily glazed clay painting covering the interior wall of the concourse level and then descending to the lower level.

== Notable places nearby ==
Utica station is located near:

- Brylin Hospital
- Cold Spring Bus Garage
- NFTA Transit Police headquarters

George Smith offers a large stainless steel sculpture based on the art and architecture of the Dogon people of Africa. When passing the sculpture, it appears to be in motion. The work of Craig Langager is very easy to recognize on the platforms at train level. His four figures, The Listener (with birds), The Portrait Maker (holding a mirror), The Stagehand (with weights and mask) and The Choreographer-Seneca Man (animal persona), are metal figures paired on either platform.
