= University station (Buffalo Metro Rail) =

Light rail station in Buffalo, New York

University
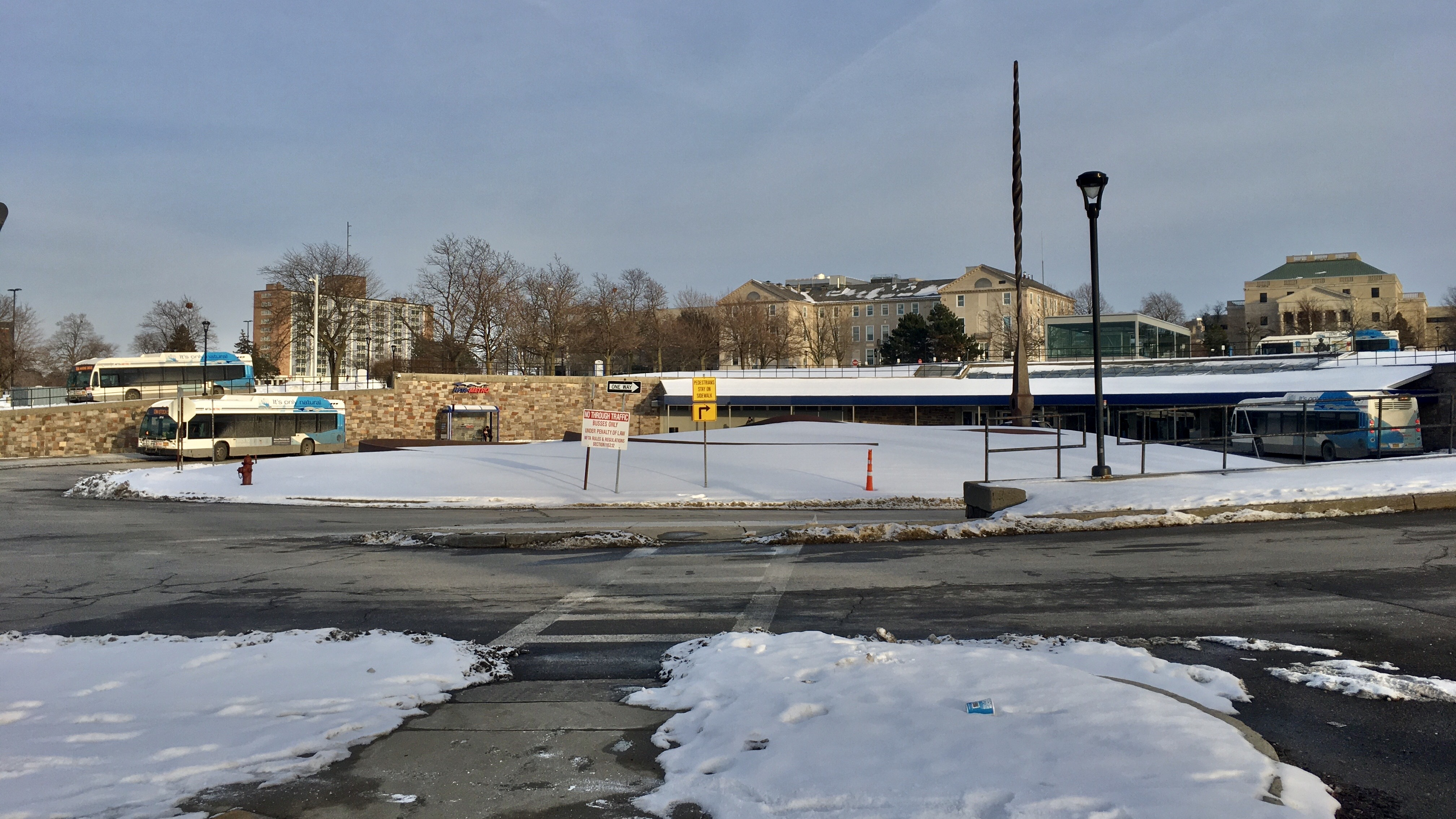
- Exterior and bus loop as seen in February 2021

General information
- Location: 3383 Main Street; Buffalo, New York
- Coordinates: 42°57′17″N 78°49′14″W
- Owner: NFTA
- Platforms: 2 inter-connected side platforms
- Tracks: 2

Construction
- Structure type: Underground
- Depth: 55 feet (17 m)
- Parking: 600 park and ride spaces, kiss and ride lot

Other information
- Fare zone: Paid fare

History
- Opened: November 10, 1986; 39 years ago
- Former names: South Campus (November 10, 1986–September 1, 2003)

Passengers
- 2017: 790,307

Services
Preceding station	NFTA	Following station
Terminus	Metro Rail	LaSalle toward DL&W
Location

University station (formerly South Campus station until September 1, 2003) is a Buffalo Metro Rail station located near the intersection of Main Street and Niagara Falls Boulevard on the University at Buffalo South Campus. It is a major transfer point between Metro Rail and many city and suburban bus routes and offers a unique "Kiss and Ride" facility on the top level, above the mezzanine. This allows drivers of automobiles a separate area to drop off passengers, so they do not add to the traffic congestion from buses at the station during rush-hour periods and a large park-and-ride facility directly to the east of the station. Since University station serves as a terminal, immediately south is a double crossover. From May 20, 1985, to November 10, 1986, due to construction issues at LaSalle station, Amherst Street station served as the northern terminus. Since November 10, 1986, University station has served as the northern terminus.

== Bus connections ==
University station serves UB South and is a transfer point for buses to the north and northeast suburbs of the city and is also one of four stations that offers an off-road bus loop, requiring passengers to board/debark using curbside stops (the other three being LaSalle, Delavan/Canisius University and Utica) and is served by 11 bus routes:

- NFTA
  - 5 Niagara–Kenmore (inbound)
  - 8 Main (inbound)
  - 12 Utica
  - 13 Kensington (inbound)
  - 19 Bailey (inbound)
  - 34 Niagara Falls Boulevard (outbound)
  - 44 Lockport (outbound)
  - 47 Youngs Road (outbound)
  - 48 Williamsville (outbound)
  - 49 Millard Fillmore Suburban (formerly Hopkins) (outbound)
  - 81 Eastside (inbound)
- University at Buffalo shuttles
  - Blue Line - serves as a shuttle van to University at Buffalo-affiliated locations of the Buffalo Niagara Medical Campus from the University at Buffalo-South Campus.
  - UB Stampede - connects the two campuses of the University at Buffalo (North and South). This service is open to members of the university community, but closed to the general public.

== Artwork ==
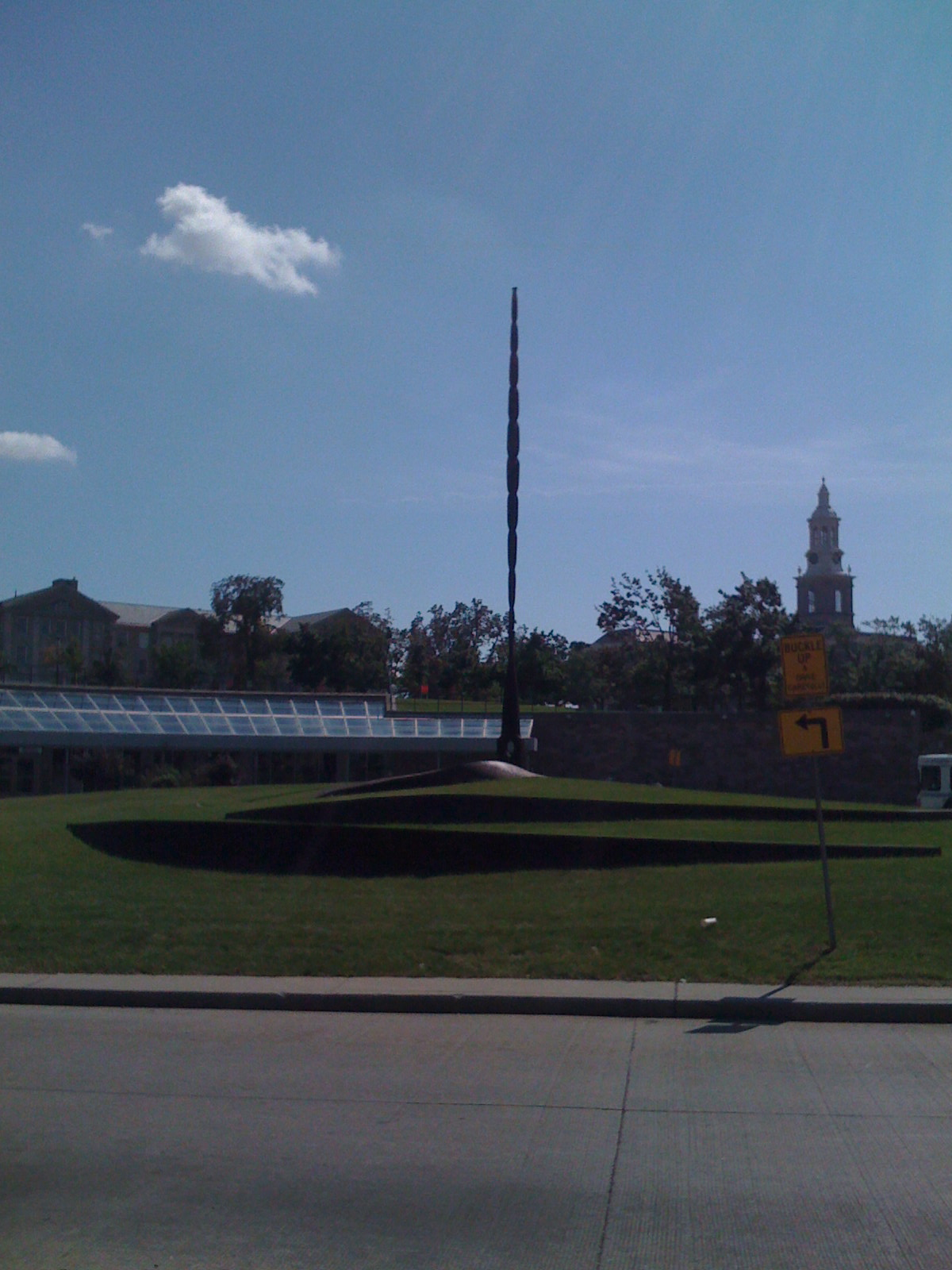
Vertical Presence-Grass Dunes at University station

In 1979, an art selection committee was created, composed of NFTA commissioners and Buffalo area art experts, that would judge the artwork that would be displayed in and on the properties of eight stations on the Metro Rail line. Out of the 70 proposals submitted, 22 were chosen and are positioned inside and outside of the eight underground stations. University station is home of three pieces of work, from Stephen Antonakos (New York City), Harvey Breverman (Buffalo), and Beverly Pepper (Todi, Italy and New York City). The work from Stephen Antonakos is called "Neon for South Campus Station" and is an "abstract form of neon tubing, creating large, incomplete circles and incomplete squares, mounted on the interior ceiling of the mezzanine level of the station." The 550 feet of tubing is red, orange and blue. Harvey Breverman's work is "a large triptych on a semi-circular wall at the foot of the escalators at the trainroom level." The work is entitled Synoptic Triptych. It focuses on the composite nature of a diverse, evolving University (at Buffalo) community and its attending resources. Beverly Pepper's work is a sculpture of steel and grass located in the bus loop entitled Vertical Presence-Grass Dunes. The work changes in appearance as the passengers ride around the loop. An illusion of movement is created through the passing sun patterns.

== Notable places nearby ==
University station is near:

- Grover Cleveland Golf Course
- Community of Eggertsville, town of Amherst
- Kenilworth neighborhood of Tonawanda
- University Plaza
- University Heights Neighborhood
- University at Buffalo South Campus
- University Presbyterian Church
- VA Western New York Healthcare System at Buffalo
