= Effect of low-cost airlines on communities =

Economic effect of low-cost airlines in a community

The effect, often referred to as "the Southwest effect", is the increase in airline travel originating from a community after service to and from that community is inaugurated by Southwest Airlines, or any similar airline that improves service or lowers cost.

== Original description ==
The U.S. Department of Transportation coined the term in 1993, to describe the considerable boost in air travel that invariably resulted from Southwest's entry into new markets, or by another airline's similar activity.

The Southwest Effect was said to have three elements:

- The new-entrant airline increased supply and offered lower prices. Southwest offered dramatically lower air fares than established airlines that usually enjoyed a near-monopoly in the communities.
- Incumbent airlines lowered their own fares. Established airlines competing with Southwest Airlines sought to avoid Southwest's entering their markets, and feared losing passengers and having to offer lower prices. Upon Southwest's entry, incumbent carriers lowered their own fares in that market (and thereby reduced their profitability), to remain competitive.
- Sales rise for all airlines in the market. For the communities affected, Southwest's entry and the corresponding drop in air fares stimulated business and increased demand for air transportation. This, in turn, increased the revenues of all airlines offering transportation to the community, and sometimes resulted in a net profit increase.

== Other carriers with similar effects ==
In recent years, some new airlines have had a greater "Southwest Effect" than Southwest itself. An MIT study released in August 2013 found newer, smaller airlines were having a greater impact on lowering the average price of a ticket where they fly. According to an MIT International Center for Air Transportation analysis of ticket statistics, between 2007 and 2012, Southwest's ability to lower fares had weakened from $36 per one-way fare to only $17 per one-way fare. At the same time, JetBlue, Allegiant, and Spirit Airlines were associated with dips of $32, $29, and $22, respectively, in markets that they entered. However, other airlines' lower fares don't account for the ancillary products that are a significant component of their business.

In August 2013, USA Today, in noting the competitive effect on prices continued to be seen, but JetBlue's impact on prices was now largest, suggested, "You might want to start calling it the JetBlue effect." The article also draws attention to JetBlue's much smaller footprint in overall domestic passenger traffic, making any claims about a widespread effect much more tenuous.
