= Delavan/Canisius College station =

Light rail station in Buffalo, New York

Delavan/Canisius College
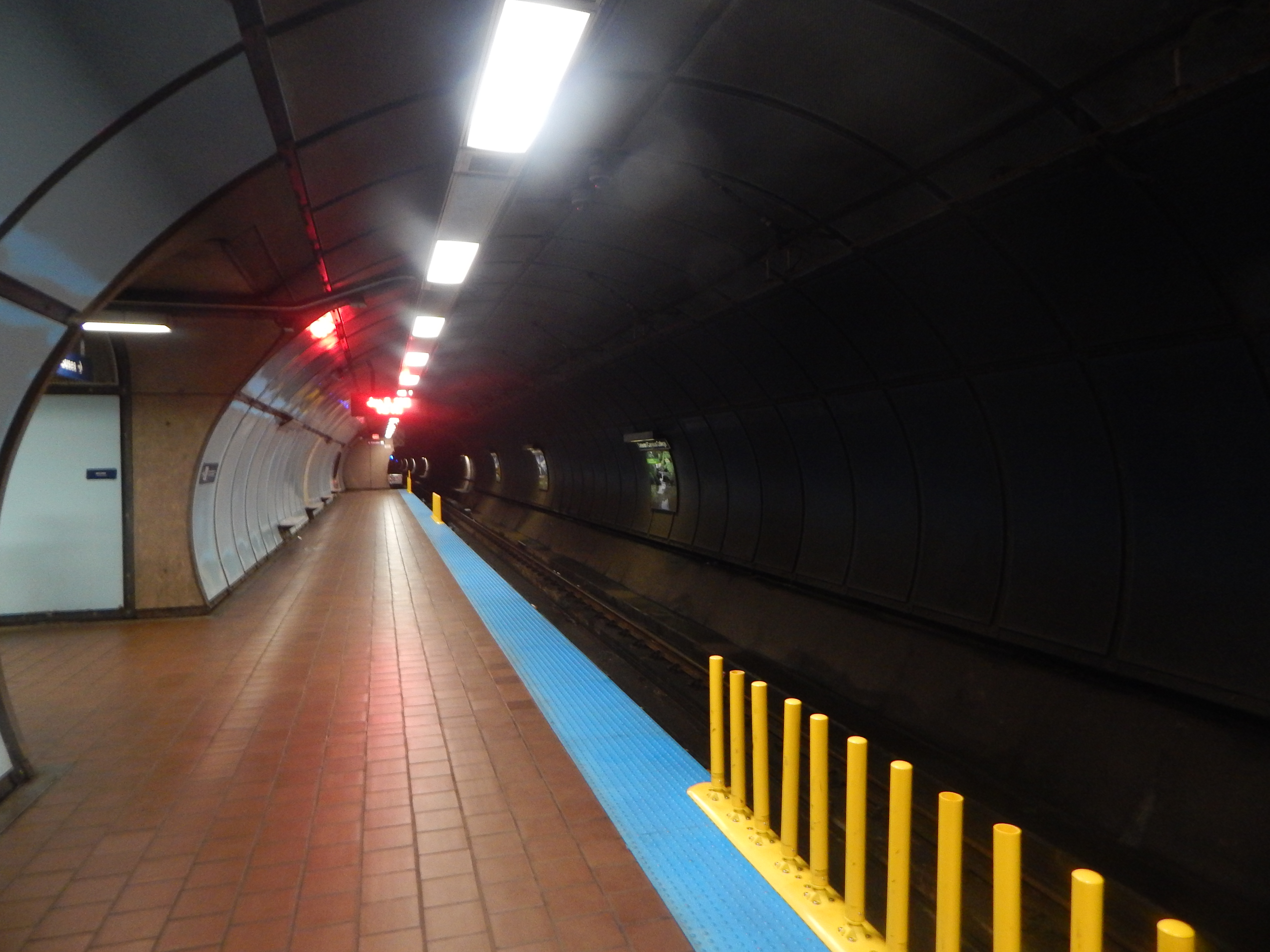
- Delavan/Canisius College station's inbound platform

General information
- Location: 1863 Main Street; Buffalo, New York
- Coordinates: 42°55′21″N 78°51′24″W
- Owner: NFTA
- Platforms: 1 island platform
- Tracks: 2

Construction
- Structure type: Underground
- Depth: 85 feet (26 m)

Other information
- Fare zone: Paid fare

History
- Opened: May 18, 1985; 41 years ago
- Former names: Delavan–College (May 18, 1985 – September 1, 2003)

Passengers
- 2017: 188,514

Services
Preceding station	NFTA	Following station
Humboldt–Hospital toward University	Metro Rail	Utica toward DL&W
Location

Delavan/Canisius College station (formerly Delavan–College station until September 1, 2003) is a Buffalo Metro Rail station located at the northeast corner of Main Street and East Delavan Avenue and is known as having one of the longest escalators set up in the country. Delavan/Canisius College station was also bored through rock and remnants of Cold Spring (a small spring) that are visible through occasional water running on the track bed floors.

In 2023, the namesake Canisius College changed its name to Canisius University. As of February 2025, the station has not yet been renamed to match.

== Bus connections ==
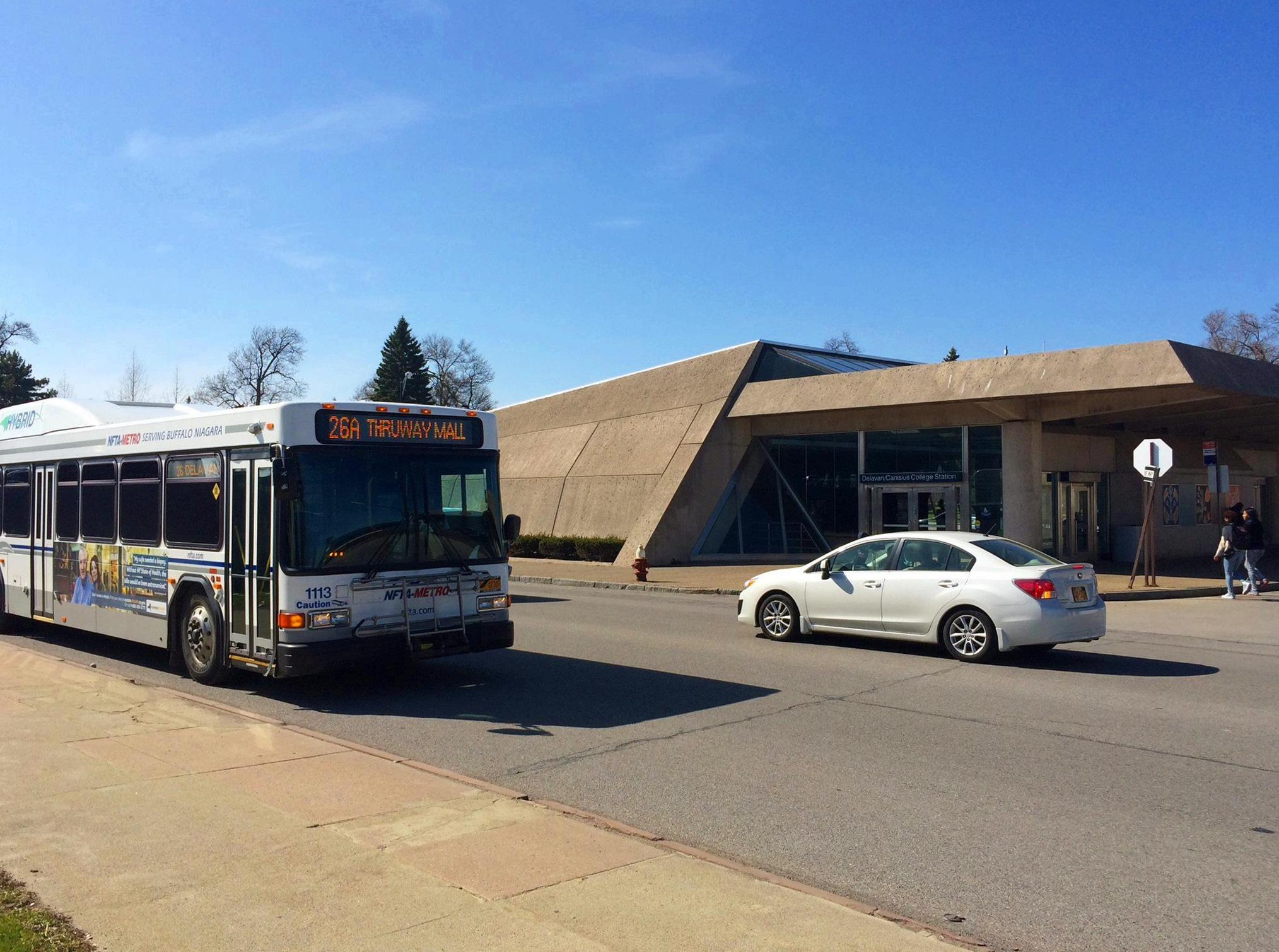
NFTA fleet number 1113 leaving Delavan/Canisius College station.

Delavan/Canisius College station is one of four stations that offers a bus loop, requiring passengers to board/debark using curbside stops (the other three being University, LaSalle and Utica) and one of only two that has a driveway for bus lines that connect with Metro Rail (the other being Utica). Route 8 buses heading toward Marine Drive or University station and route 26 buses heading toward Thruway Mall do not board at the curb on the same side as the station, which is served by four bus routes:

Boarding from Bus Loop:

- 18 Jefferson (inbound)
- 29 Wohlers (inbound)

Boarding on Main Street:

- 8 Main

Boarding on East Delavan Avenue:

- 26 Delavan

== Artwork ==
In 1979, an art selection committee was created, composed of NFTA commissioners and Buffalo area art experts, that would judge the artwork that would be displayed in and on the properties of eight stations on the Metro Rail line. Out of the 70 proposals submitted, 22 were chosen and are currently positioned inside and outside of the eight underground stations. Delavan/Canisius College station is home of three pieces of work, from Sam Gilliam (Washington, D.C.), Carson Waterman (Seneca-Iroquois National Museum) and George Woodman (New York City and Boulder, Colorado).

== Notable places nearby ==
Delavan/Canisius College station is located near:

- Canisius University
- Cold Spring Bus Garage
- Forest Lawn Cemetery
- Gates Circle
- Hamlin Park Neighborhood
