= Buffalo Pro Soccer =

American professional soccer club based in Buffalo

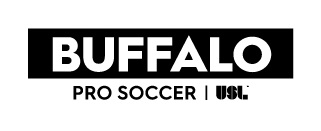
- Founded: March 28, 2024; 2 years ago
- President: Peter Marlette Jr
- League: USL Championship (men); USL Super League (women)
- Website: buffaloprosoccer.com

Buffalo Pro Soccer is a planned American professional soccer team based in Buffalo, New York.

Founded in 2024, the team initially planned to compete in the USL Championship and play its inaugural season at a site to be determined in 2026. It then delayed its start to 2027 and has since again postponed to 2028 while awaiting a principal owner and suitable stadium. A women's team will also compete in the USL Super League.

Plans were initially announced in 2025 for the construction of Queen City Field to accommodate the team, but the project was scrapped over environmental concerns at the remediated field.

== History ==
=== History of professional soccer in Buffalo ===
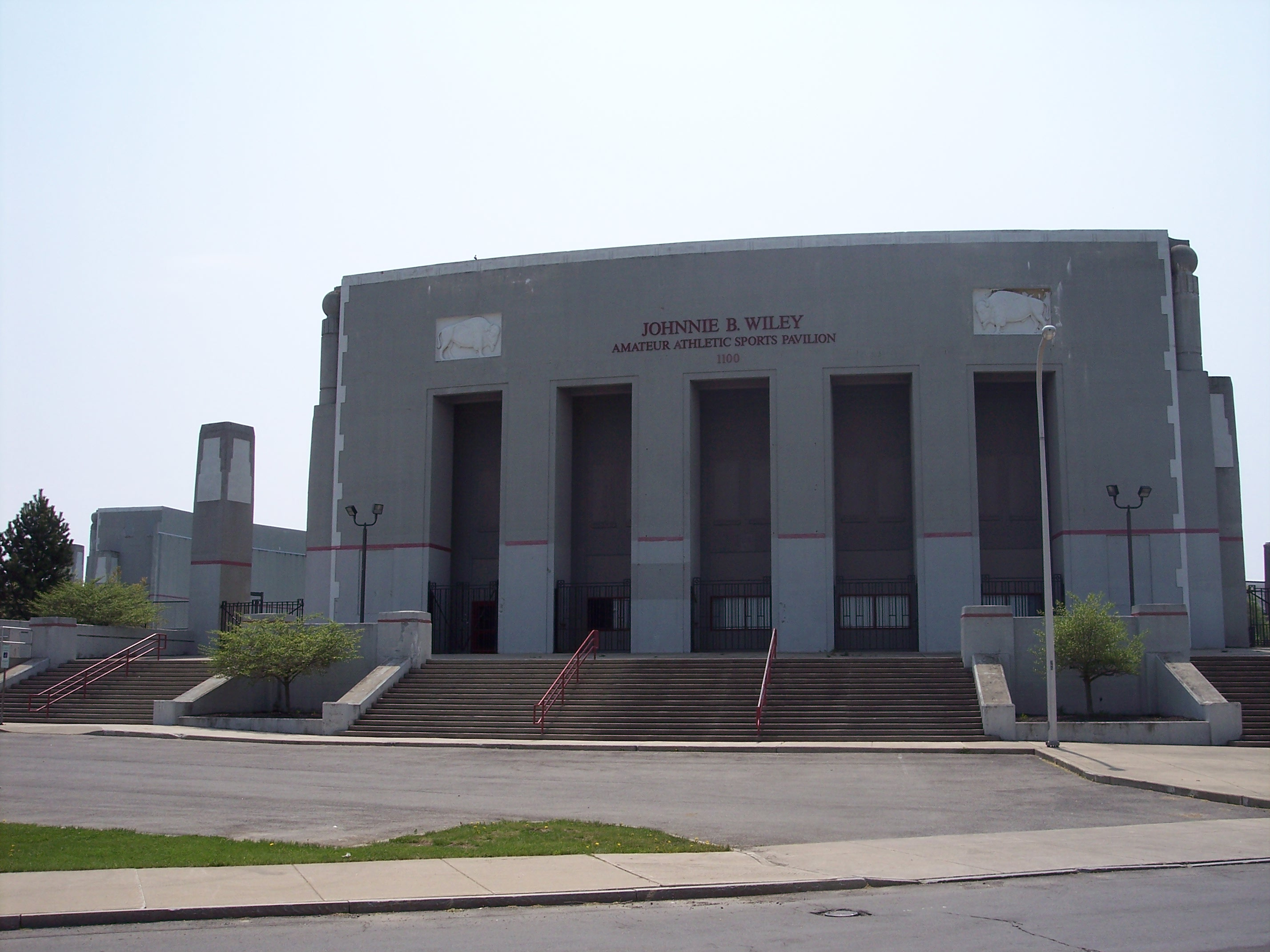
War Memorial Stadium, former home of the Buffalo White Eagles and Buffalo Blazers

Several amateur teams from Buffalo have participated in the U.S. Open Cup. These teams include the Buffalo Corinthians (1913–14), Buffalo Hungarian SC (1928–29, 1939–40), Buffalo German American SC (1932, 1939–40, 1948), Buffalo City GOP (1941), and Simon Pure SC (1968).

Buffalo previously had three professional outdoor soccer teams play within its city limits – the Buffalo White Eagles (1962, ECPSL), Buffalo Blazers (1976–1980, NSL), and Buffalo Storm (1984, USL). The city also hosted two professional indoor soccer teams – the Buffalo Stallions (1979–1984, MISL) and Buffalo Blizzard (1992–2001, NPSL).

Buffalo Bulls men's soccer coach John Astudillo and former Buffalo Stallions coach Sal DeRosa led an unsuccessful bid to have Buffalo host matches for the 1994 FIFA World Cup at Rich Stadium.

Real estate developer John McClutchy acquired the rights to a Buffalo USL Championship expansion franchise in 2019 with aspirations to play at New Highmark Stadium, but he never founded a team.

=== Franchise and academy acquisition, 2024–2025 ===
On March 28, 2024, former professional soccer player Peter Marlette Jr. and his newly formed Buffalo Pro Soccer club were awarded the rights to a USL Championship expansion franchise. Marlette Jr. also announced plans to found a women's team of the same name in the USL Super League. As general manager of Union Omaha, Marlette Jr. led that club to USL League One regular season championships in 2021 and 2023, and the playoff championship in 2021.

Peter Marlette Jr. announced on February 6, 2025 that the club had acquired the youth academy of USL League Two team FC Buffalo, renaming it Buffalo Pro Soccer Academy.

=== Stadium selection and cancellation, 2025 ===
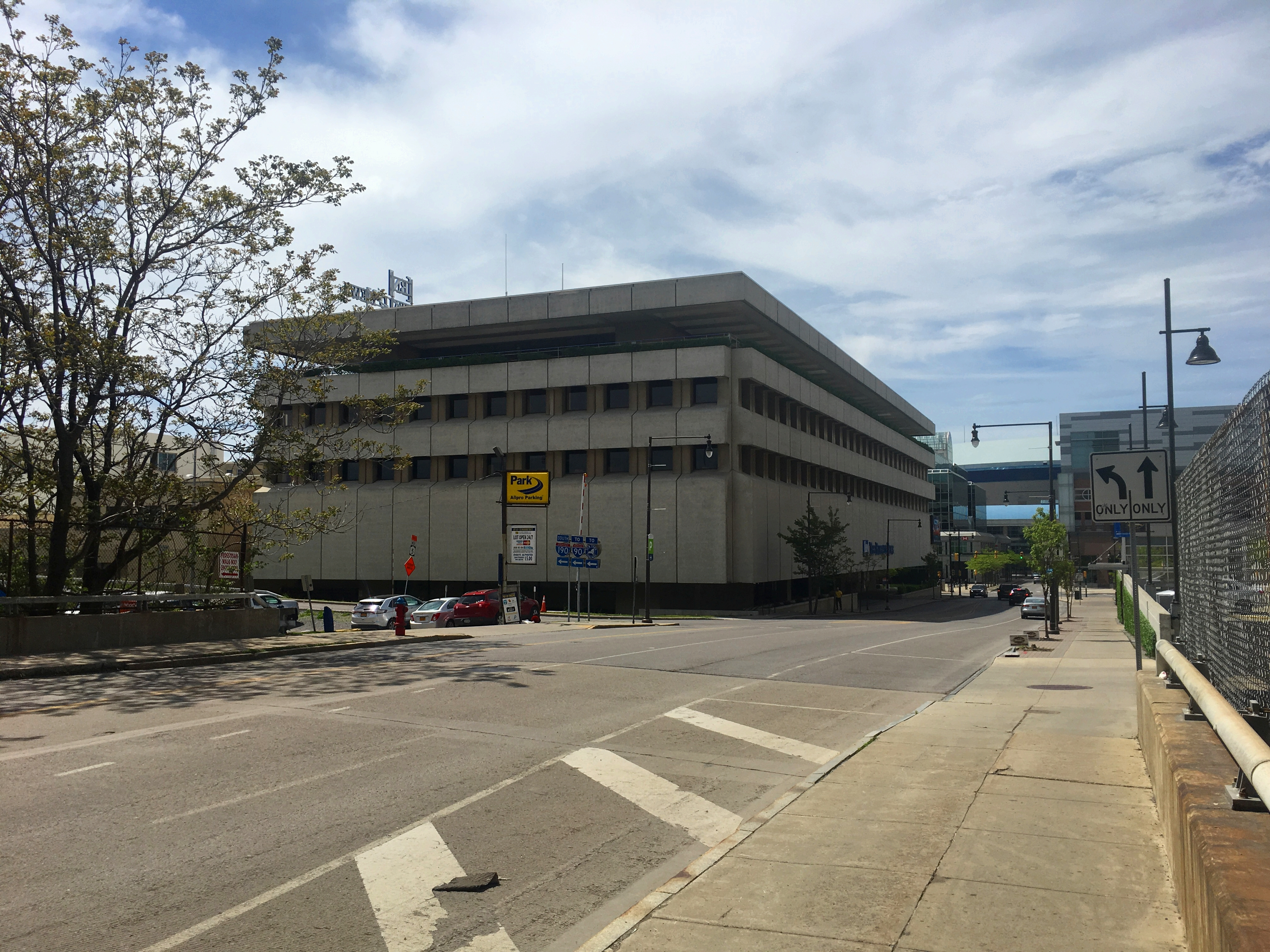
Rejected Buffalo News stadium site in downtown Buffalo, New York

Three potential stadium sites were considered – the former Buffalo News headquarters in downtown Buffalo, Father Conway Park in the Old First Ward, and the abandoned Medaille Sports Complex in the Lovejoy District. The Buffalo News site was preferred, which would have cost $40 million and required $20 million in public funding. Father Conway Park would have required environmental remediation, as it was built atop the former Ohio Street Basin that was filled with industrial waste.

On April 11, 2025, Buffalo Pro Soccer held a press conference to announce that Medaille Sports Complex, now renamed Queen City Field, would be expanded to a capacity of 7,600 with $10 million in private funding. It would have been expandable to a capacity of 15,000 should the team have earned promotion to USL Premier under the league's new promotion and relegation system. Politicians in attendance included former congressman Brian Higgins, State Sen. Sean Ryan, acting mayor Christopher Scanlon, Lovejoy District Councilor Bryan J. Bollman, and Erie County Legislator Lawrence Dupre. The venue would have utilized modular construction, featuring adjacent practice fields for the team and Buffalo Pro Soccer Academy. Season ticket deposits were made available at $20 each, and 800 were purchased during their first weekend on sale.

The stadium site was criticized due to its distance from downtown Buffalo and past environmental problems. Queen City Field is two miles from downtown Buffalo, and was previously closed in 2021 due to sulfur dioxide emissions from the neighboring PVS Chemicals plant.

Buffalo Pro Soccer announced on July 3, 2025 that the Queen City Field project had been cancelled over environmental concerns, the team's inaugural season had been pushed back to 2027, and that the site selection process for their stadium had reopened..

=== Ownership and coaching search, 2025–present ===
Although the team's ownership group is private, $20 million was raised as of April 2025, with Queen City Field owner Jon M. Williams and Buffalo Bills player Reid Ferguson both named as investors. The team is currently searching for their league-required principal owner who has a minimum net worth of $30 million, and must purchase a 35% stake in the club.

Peter Marlette Jr. revealed the club's head coach has been selected, and is described as, "a recently retired, remarkably famous" Premier League player.
