= Queen City Field =

Stadium in Buffalo, New York

- Artist rendering of cancelled 2026 expansion.
- Interactive map of Queen City Field
- Former names: Medaille Sports Complex (2019–2023)
- Location: 427 Elk Street; Buffalo, NY 14210
- Coordinates: 42°51′57.35070″N 78°50′17.94624″W
- Elevation: 591 feet (180 m)
- Owner: Jon M. Williams
- Capacity: 500 (2019–present)
- Executive suites: 12
- Acreage: 12 acres (4.9 ha)
- Public transit: Seneca & Babcock, Route 15

Construction
- Groundbreaking: September 10, 2018
- Opened: September 12, 2019
- Expanded: 2022
- Cost: US$4 million (2019) ($5.04 million in 2025 dollars); US$7.5 million (2022 expansion) ($8.25 million in 2025 dollars)
- Architect: Carmina Wood Morris (2019)
- General contractor: South Buffalo Development

Tenants
- Medaille Mavericks (NCAA D3) 2019–2023; Daemen Wildcats (NCAA D2) 2023

Website
- Medaille Sports Complex

Queen City Field is a multipurpose stadium in Buffalo, New York.

Opened in 2019 as the Medaille Sports Complex, it was planned to be expanded for the city's Buffalo Pro Soccer club. However, the expansion was cancelled in 2025 due to environmental concerns.

The stadium is an anchor tenant of Buffalo Color Park, a 21-acre remediated brownfield site that also includes the Heritage Discovery Center and The Powerhouse. It formerly housed Medaille University athletics events before the school's closure in 2023.

== History ==
=== Construction and opening, 2018–2020 ===
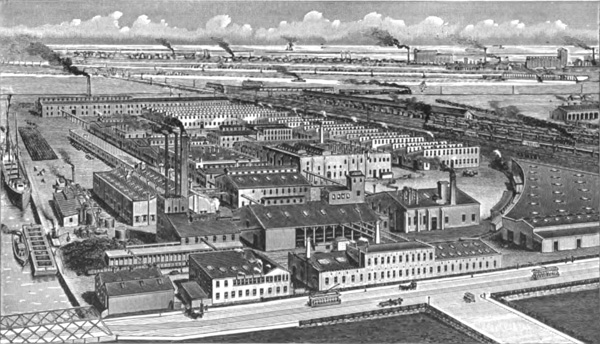
Schoellkopf, Hartford & Hanna Company in Buffalo, New York, ca. 1908.

Jon M. Williams, founder of environmental remediation company Ontario Specialty Contracting and real estate company South Buffalo Development, originally purchased the site in a 2009 tax foreclosure auction. He contributed $3.5 million to Honeywell's $20 million cleanup of the property, and received $6.6 million in brownfield tax credits from the State of New York. The 21 acre brownfield site was formerly occupied by coal tar dye manufacturer Schoellkopf, Hartford & Hanna Company, and Williams constructed Buffalo Color Park on its grounds.

Medaille Sports Complex opened in 2019 as the anchor tenant of Buffalo Color Park, and the $4 million facility served as home of Medaille University's athletic teams. The 5 acre complex originally consisted of a dual-purpose artificial turf field for lacrosse and soccer, along with a 20,000 sq ft (1,900 m^{2}) building that housed locker rooms and training facilities. Medaille's small campus did not allow space for outdoor sports, and they had previously rented both All-High Stadium and Dobson Field for lacrosse and soccer games.

=== Closure due to air pollution, 2021 ===
Medaille University was forced to close the venue in 2021 due to health concerns for athletes and spectators, citing sulfur dioxide emissions from the neighboring PVS Chemicals plant. PVS Chemicals was sued by Medaille that same year after they ignored a New York State Department of Environmental Conservation order to shut down their plant. Remediation ordered by the state later brought air quality back to acceptable levels.

=== Expansion and reopening, 2022–2023 ===
A $7.5 million expansion was completed in 2022, adding playing surfaces for baseball, softball, and field hockey on 7 acres of previously unused land. Medaille University resumed playing at the venue for their 2022 athletic season.

Medaille closed in 2023, which was attributed in part to debt the school owed from stadium construction and their 15-year lease with the venue.

Daemen University utilized the venue for their inaugural lacrosse season in 2023, then moved to Coyer Field.

=== Second expansion and cancellation, 2025 ===
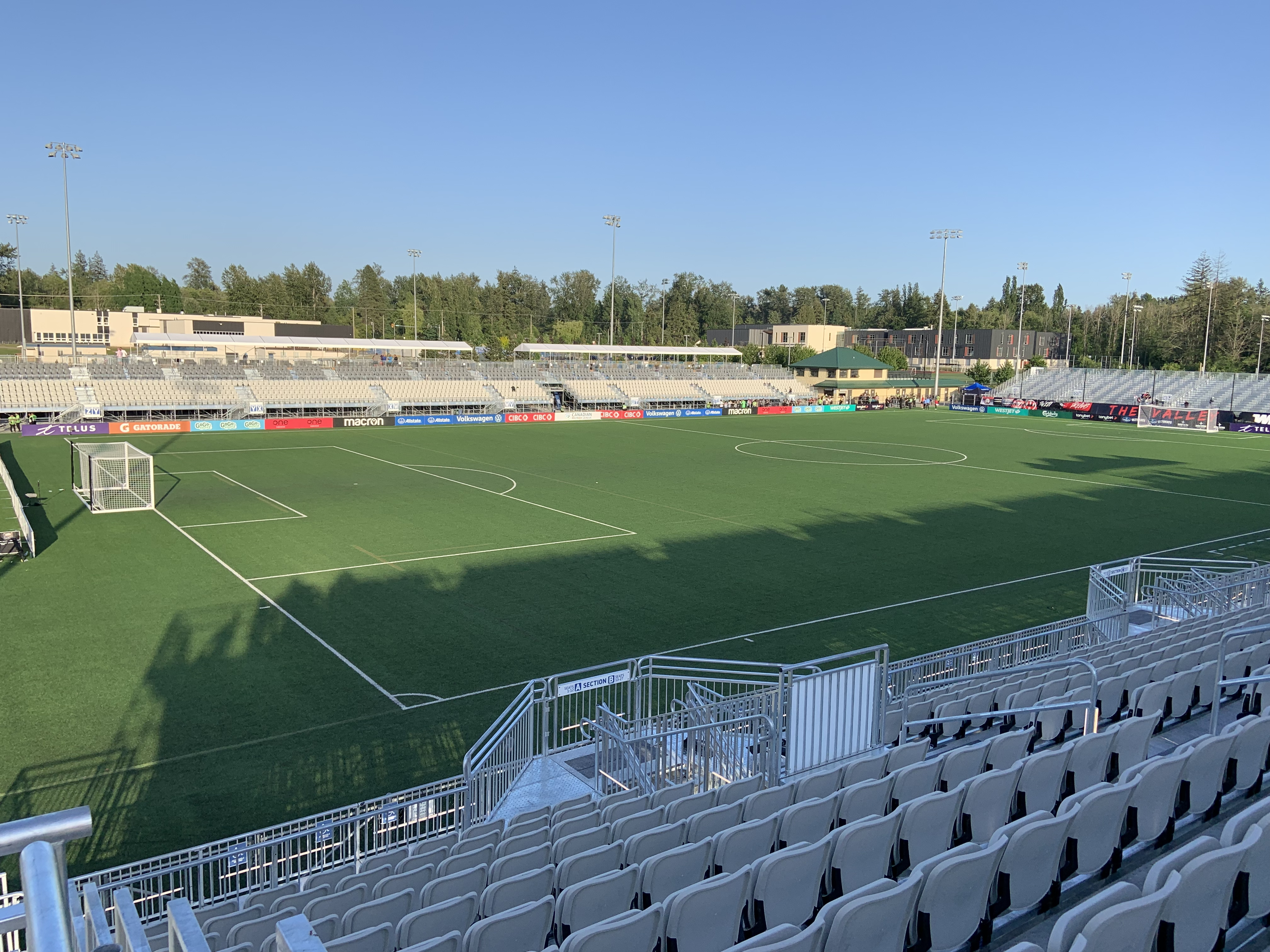
Willoughby Community Park, a prior project of SixFive Stadium Experience

A $10 million expansion of the newly renamed Queen City Field was to be completed in 2026 to host Buffalo Pro Soccer, a team competing in the USL Championship and USL Super League. The expansion would have been be privately funded by Buffalo Color Park owner Jon M. Williams along with Buffalo Pro Soccer's ownership group, which includes Buffalo Bills player Reid Ferguson.

The site selection by Buffalo Pro Soccer was criticized due to the property's environmental history and distance from downtown Buffalo. Buffalo Pro Soccer's favored site choice of the former Buffalo News headquarters on Washington Street would have cost $40 million and required $20 million in public funding. United Steelworkers Local 8823, which represents the workers of PVS Chemicals, opposed the stadium's expansion.

PVS Chemicals released a statement criticizing the expansion plans:

PVS strongly supports athletics and sports as well as the City of Buffalo’s economic improvement, but this is simply not the location for such a facility. Beyond serious legal questions, it makes no sense to build a large stadium next to a chemical plant that has been there for 100 years and is not going anywhere, as we continue to make significant investment in our operations.

Modular construction was to be utilized to quickly complete the renovation, with the parts manufactured by SixFive Stadium Experience. SixFive Stadium Experience previously manufactured Willoughby Community Park for Vancouver FC of the Canadian Premier League.

Capacity of the expanded venue would have been 7,600, and with USL implementing promotion and relegation beginning in 2027, it would have been expandable to 15,000 should Buffalo Pro Soccer have earned promotion to USL Premier. The baseball and softball diamonds that were added in 2022 would have been removed as part of the expansion, while the complex's other playing surfaces would have been retained as practice fields.

Local politicians hoped the stadium would have spawned a new entertainment district within the city's Valley neighborhood, along with the nearby OnCore Golf ShotClub Social driving range that was to open in 2026.

The expansion was cancelled by Buffalo Pro Soccer on July 3, 2025, announcing they had terminated their land lease with Jon M. Williams due to environmental concerns.

== Transportation access ==
Queen City Field is located within one mile of the Smith Street exit (Exit 4) of Interstate 190 (northbound and southbound).

Niagara Frontier Transportation Authority maintains the Seneca & Babcock bus stop a half-mile north of the venue, providing local service on Route 15 from the Valley neighborhood to downtown Buffalo (northbound) and West Seneca (southbound).

Events and tenants
| Preceded by Dobson Field | Home of the Medaille Mavericks; 2019 – 2023 | Succeeded by Final |
| Preceded by Inaugural | Home of the Daemen Wildcats; 2023 | Succeeded by Coyer Field |
