= Blake Ferguson (American football) =

American football player (born 1997)

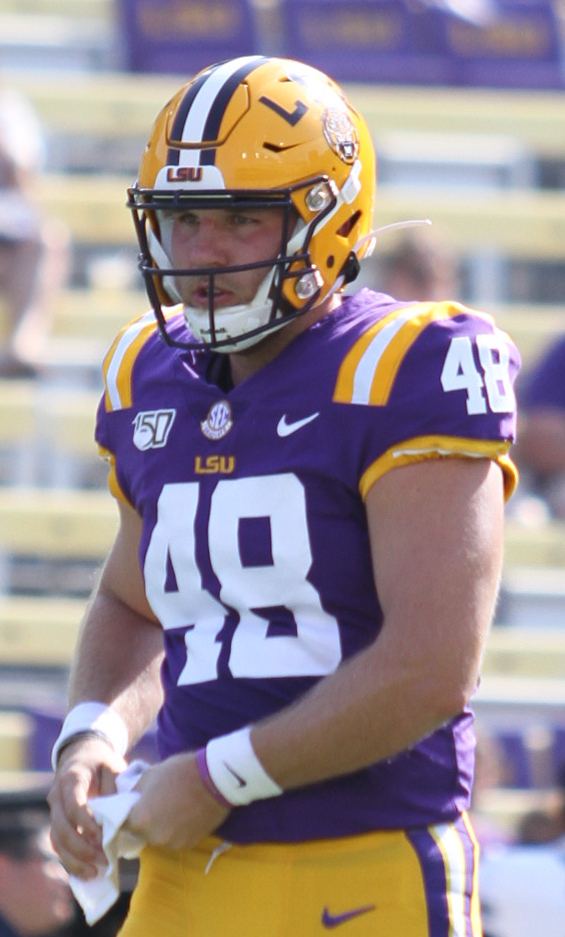
- Ferguson with the LSU Tigers in 2019

Profile
- Position: Long snapper

Personal information
- Born: April 21, 1997 (age 29); Smyrna, Georgia, U.S.
- Listed height: 6 ft 3 in (1.91 m)
- Listed weight: 230 lb (104 kg)

Career information
- High school: Buford (Buford, Georgia)
- College: LSU (2015–2019)
- NFL draft: 2020: 6th round, 185th overall pick

Career history
- Miami Dolphins (2020–2024); Houston Texans (2025)*
- * Offseason or practice squad member only

Awards and highlights
- CFP national champion (2019)

Career NFL statistics as of 2024
- Games played: 72
- Total tackles: 8
- Stats at Pro Football Reference

Blake Whittfield Ferguson (born April 21, 1997) is an American professional football long snapper. He played college football for the LSU Tigers, winning a national championship in 2020.

== Early life ==
Ferguson attended Buford High School (Georgia) in Buford, Georgia where he was ranked as the number one long snapper nationally by Scout and 247Sports. He was rated as two-star prospect by Rivals, ESPN, 247Sports and Scout. He earned an invitation to play in the Army All-American game. During his high school career, he helped lead his team to three state titles in his prep career. He was the recipient of the Chris Rubio Award which is given to the nation's top high school long snapper as a junior and senior.

== College career ==
Ferguson played college football for LSU from 2015 to 2019. He played in 52 games at long snapper, and was also a two-year captain of the team.

== Professional career ==
Pre-draft measurables
Height	Weight	Arm length	Hand span	40-yard dash	10-yard split	20-yard split	20-yard shuttle	Three-cone drill	Vertical jump	Broad jump	Bench press
6 ft 2 5/8 in (1.90 m)	229 lb (104 kg)	31 3/8 in (0.80 m)	9 3/4 in (0.25 m)	5.07 s	1.79 s	2.96 s	4.52 s	7.43 s	31.0 in (0.79 m)	9 ft 4 in (2.84 m)	8 reps
All values from NFL Combine

=== Miami Dolphins ===
Ferguson was selected by the Miami Dolphins in the sixth round (185th overall) of the 2020 NFL draft. He signed a four-year contract on May 10. He was named the Dolphins starting long snapper as a rookie.

On September 6, 2023, Ferguson signed a three-year contract extension with the Dolphins.

On May 8, 2025, Ferguson was released by the Dolphins.

=== Houston Texans ===
On August 20, 2025, Ferguson signed with the Houston Texans. He was released on August 26 as part of final roster cuts.

== Personal life ==
Ferguson's parents are Tracy and Kevin Ferguson. He is the younger brother of Buffalo Bills long snapper Reid Ferguson. He has type 1 diabetes.

In July 2024, Ferguson married Abbey Hale.

Ferguson has been an outspoken conservative on social media, supporting the Republican Party as well as candidates like Donald Trump and Ron DeSantis. He holds pro-life views on abortion.
