= Ezekiel Elliott =

American football player (born 1995)

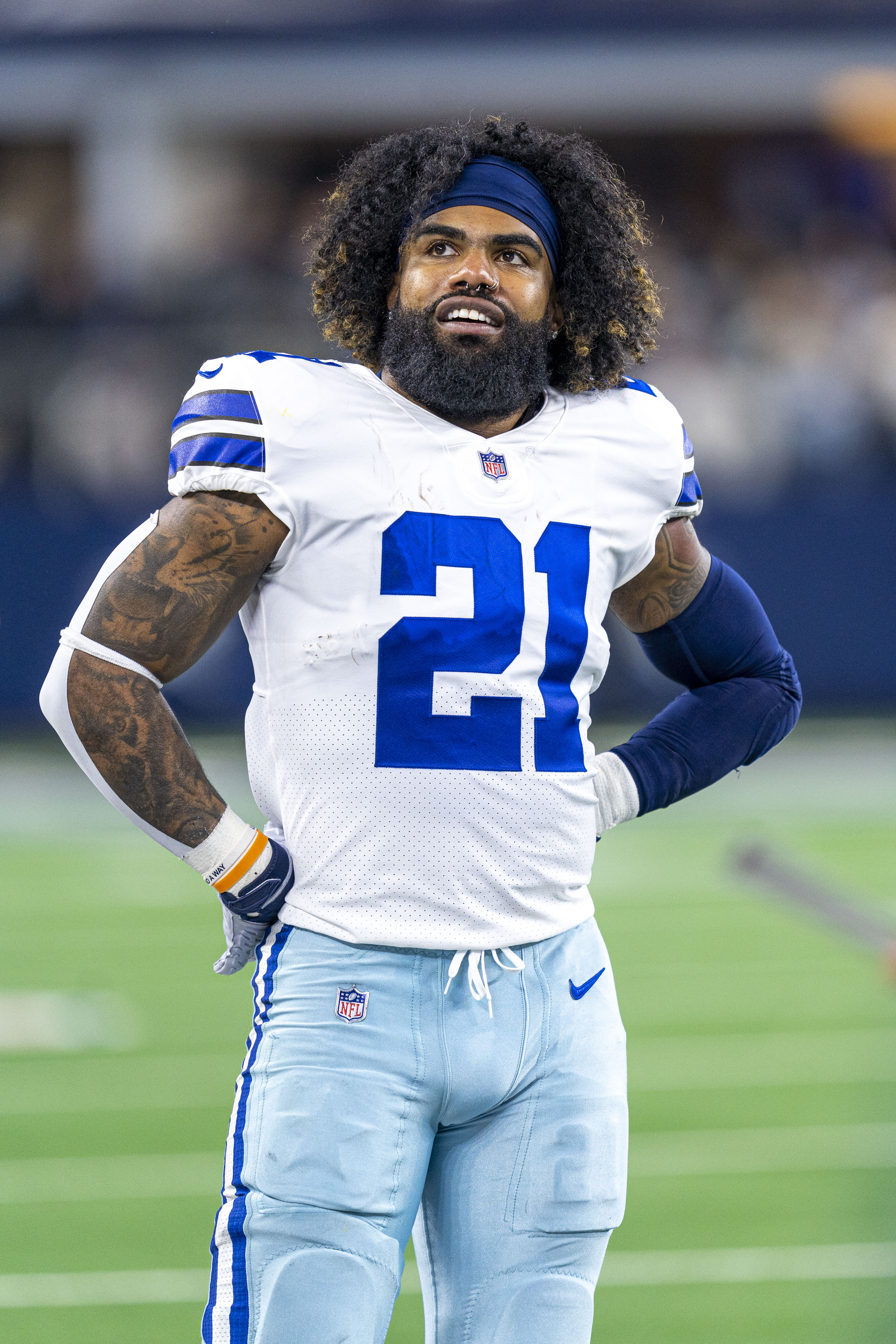
- Elliott with the Dallas Cowboys in 2021

No. 21, 15
- Position: Running back

Personal information
- Born: July 22, 1995 (age 31); Alton, Illinois, U.S.
- Listed height: 6 ft 0 in (1.83 m)
- Listed weight: 225 lb (102 kg)

Career information
- High school: John Burroughs (Ladue, Missouri)
- College: Ohio State (2013–2015)
- NFL draft: 2016: 1st round, 4th overall pick

Career history
- Dallas Cowboys (2016–2022); New England Patriots (2023); Dallas Cowboys (2024); Los Angeles Chargers (2024)*
- * Offseason or practice squad member only

Awards and highlights
- PFWA NFL Rookie of the Year (2016); First-team All-Pro (2016); Second-team All-Pro (2018); 3× Pro Bowl (2016, 2018, 2019); PFWA All-Rookie Team (2016); 2× NFL rushing yards leader (2016, 2018); CFP national champion (2014); CFP National Championship Game Offensive MVP (2015); James E. Sullivan Award (2014); Second-team All-American (2015); Big Ten Most Valuable Player (2015); Big Ten Offensive Player of the Year (2015); Big Ten Running Back of the Year (2015); First-team All-Big Ten (2015)

Career NFL statistics
- Rushing yards: 9,130
- Rushing average: 4.3
- Rushing touchdowns: 74
- Receptions: 368
- Receiving yards: 2,718
- Receiving touchdowns: 14
- Stats at Pro Football Reference

Ezekiel Elijah Elliott (born July 22, 1995), nicknamed "Zeke", is an American professional football running back. He played college football for the Ohio State Buckeyes, earning second-team All-American honors in 2015. Elliott was selected by the Dallas Cowboys fourth overall in the 2016 NFL draft. In his first seven NFL seasons, all with the Cowboys, he was a three-time Pro Bowl, two-time All-Pro selection, and led the league in rushing yards in 2016 and 2018. After being released by the Cowboys after the 2022 season, Elliott played the 2023 season for the New England Patriots. Elliott then re-signed and played for the Cowboys in the following 2024 season, before being released by the team before the final game of the season.

== Early life ==
Elliott was born in Alton, Illinois, to a mother and father who were both athletes in college. His mother, the former Dawn Huff, was a high school state champion in three sports before attending the University of Missouri and running track there. His father, Stacy, was a linebacker for the Missouri football team and CEO of Fifth Down Enterprises. Elliott's maternal grandfather played basketball for Drake University. His uncle is Finnish professional basketball player Shawn Huff.

Despite his athletic pedigree, Elliott attended more academically driven John Burroughs School in Ladue, Missouri, where he was a three-sport star in football, basketball, and track and field. Elliott also played baseball. He played as a running back for the John Burroughs Bombers football team. As a junior in 2012, Elliott was named the St. Louis Post-Dispatch offensive player of the year after rushing for 1,802 yards and 34 touchdowns and recording 23 receptions for 401 yards and six scores. In his senior year, Elliott had 3,061 all-purpose yards and 50 total touchdowns, including 2,155 rushing yards and 40 rushing touchdowns. He led the football team to three straight championship games, but lost all three.

Also a standout track and field athlete, Elliott was a state qualifier in sprinting and hurdling events. He capped his high school career by winning four state championships at the Missouri Class 3 state championships in 2 1/2 hours (100-meter dash, 200-meter dash, 110-meter high hurdles and 300-meter hurdles). Elliott recorded career-best times of 10.95 seconds in the 100-meter dash, 22.05 seconds in the 200-meter dash, 13.77 seconds in the 110m hurdles and 37.52 seconds in the 300m hurdles. He was named the Gatorade Track Athlete of the Year in the state of Missouri.

Considered a four-star recruit by Scout.com, Elliott was listed as the No. 9 running back in the nation in 2013. He played in the 2013 U.S. Army All-American Bowl. Despite overwhelming support and pressure for Elliott to sign with his parents' alma mater, the University of Missouri, he decided to sign with Ohio State University.

== College career ==
As a true freshman at Ohio State University in 2013, Elliott rushed for 262 yards on 30 carries with two touchdowns as a backup to starter Carlos Hyde, mostly playing as a gunner on special teams.

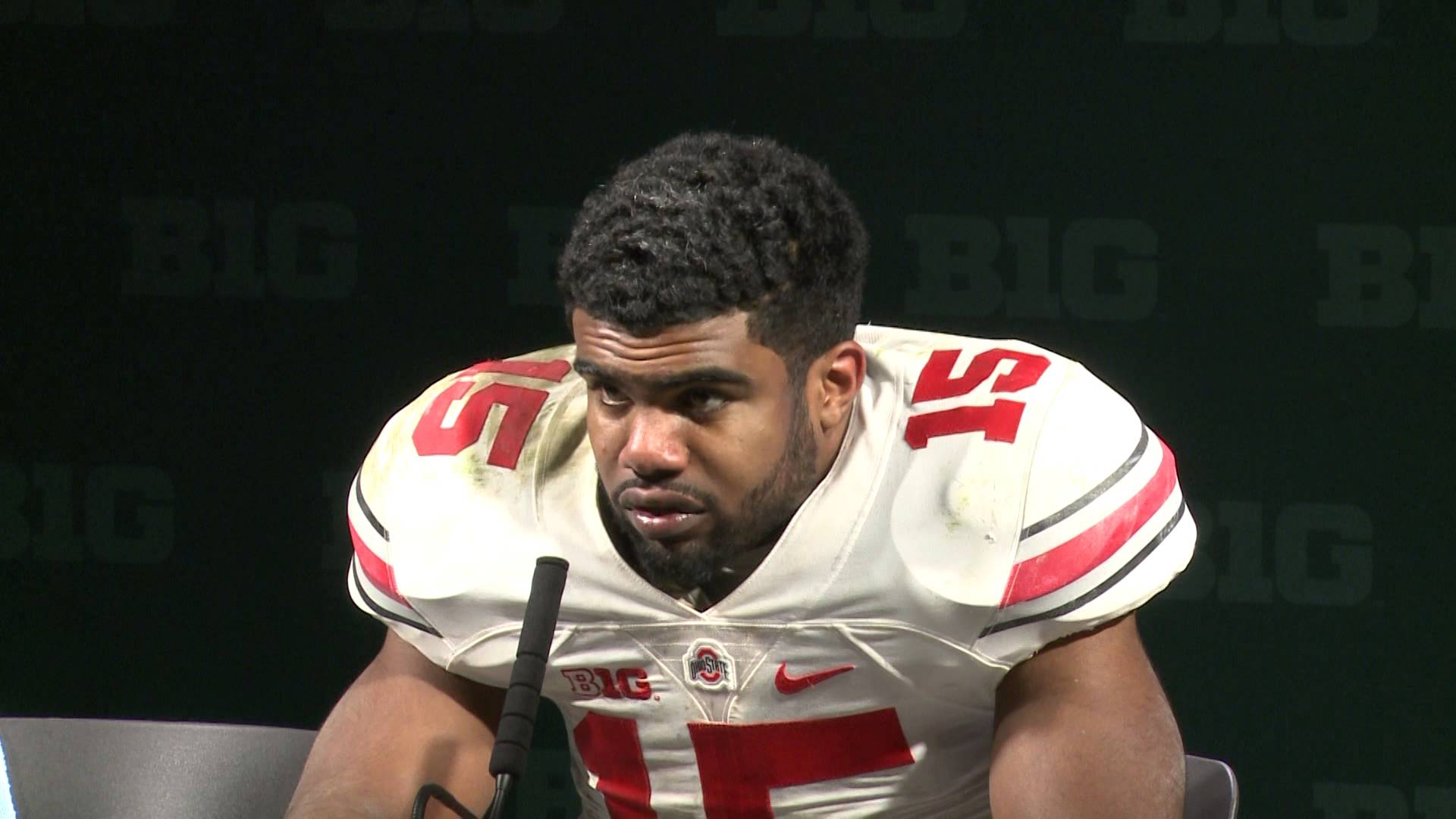
Elliott in 2014

In 2014, with the departure of Hyde to the NFL, Elliott took over as the starter for the Buckeyes. During the season, Elliott was named to the Academic All-Big Ten Conference team. He rushed for over 100 yards six times during the scheduled season. In the 2014 Big Ten Championship Game against the Wisconsin Badgers, Elliott rushed for 220 yards on 20 carries for two touchdowns. The victory qualified Ohio State for the first-ever College Football Playoff. In the 2015 Sugar Bowl against #1 Alabama, Elliott ran for 230 yards on 20 carries in a hard-fought 42–35 victory where he was named the Offensive Player of the Game, including an 85-yard touchdown run to seal the win. Elliott then capped the Buckeyes' championship season by rushing for 246 yards on 36 carries and scoring four touchdowns against the Oregon Ducks. He was named the Offensive MVP of that game as well; it was the third most rushing yards ever by an Ohio State player.

In 2015, Elliott began the season by rushing for over 100 yards in 10 straight wins, including 274 against Indiana on October 3 (the second most all-time by an Ohio State player). However, the team suffered a 17–14 loss to Michigan State on November 21, 2015, and Elliott announced that he would enter the 2016 NFL draft. The following week, Elliott ran for 214 yards on 30 carries in a 42–13 Ohio State victory over rival Michigan in Ann Arbor, his fifth 200+ yard game. He ended his collegiate career with 149 yards and four touchdowns in a Fiesta Bowl victory over Notre Dame.

Elliott finished his career at Ohio State on several leaderboards. He was second in career rushing yards with 3,961 and yards per game with 101.6 (both behind only Archie Griffin), had the second and third most rushing yards in a season, and five of the top 20 rushing yards in a game. Elliott's 43 rushing touchdowns was fourth most all time, and his 23 in 2015 was third most in a season. His 12 100-yard rushing games in the 2015 season also tied Elliott with Eddie George for a school record, and the 22 such games Elliott amassed over his career was again second only to Griffin (as was his streak of 15 consecutive 100-yard games from 2014 to 2015). Elliott and George are the only Ohio State players with five 200-yard rushing games.

=== Individual awards ===
Elliott received numerous honors during his tenure at Ohio State. In 2014, Elliott was named the Offensive MVP of both the 2015 Sugar Bowl and the 2015 College Football Playoff National Championship Game.

Elliott's success at the end of the 2014 season made him a front-runner for the 2015 Heisman Trophy, though Elliott in fact finished eighth in the voting. After a successful regular season in which he gained 1,672 yards and 19 touchdowns, Elliott was named the 2015 Graham-George Offensive Player of the Year, 2015 Ameche-Dayne Running Back of the Year and was selected as Unanimous First Team All-Big Ten. In addition to the yearly awards, he was also named Big Ten Player of the Week twice during the 2015 season for his performances in Week 5 against Indiana, and in Week 13 against Michigan.

== Professional career ==
=== Pre-draft ===
Before the draft, Elliott was labeled the most complete back to enter the NFL since Adrian Peterson in 2007 and was predicted to be a top 10 selection. On a draft breakdown by NFL.com, Elliott drew comparisons to Edgerrin James and was listed as a three-down back that had "rare combination of size, athleticism, pass-catching and blocking skills", and that he "should still come out of the gates as one of the most productive young running backs in the league".

Pre-draft measurables
Height	Weight	Arm length	Hand span	Wingspan	40-yard dash	10-yard split	20-yard split	Vertical jump	Broad jump	Wonderlic
5 ft 11 3/4 in (1.82 m)	225 lb (102 kg)	31 1/4 in (0.79 m)	10 1/4 in (0.26 m)	6 ft 3 3/8 in (1.91 m)	4.47 s	1.50 s	2.62 s	32.5 in (0.83 m)	9 ft 10 in (3.00 m)	32
All values from NFL Combine

=== Dallas Cowboys (first stint) ===
==== 2016 season ====
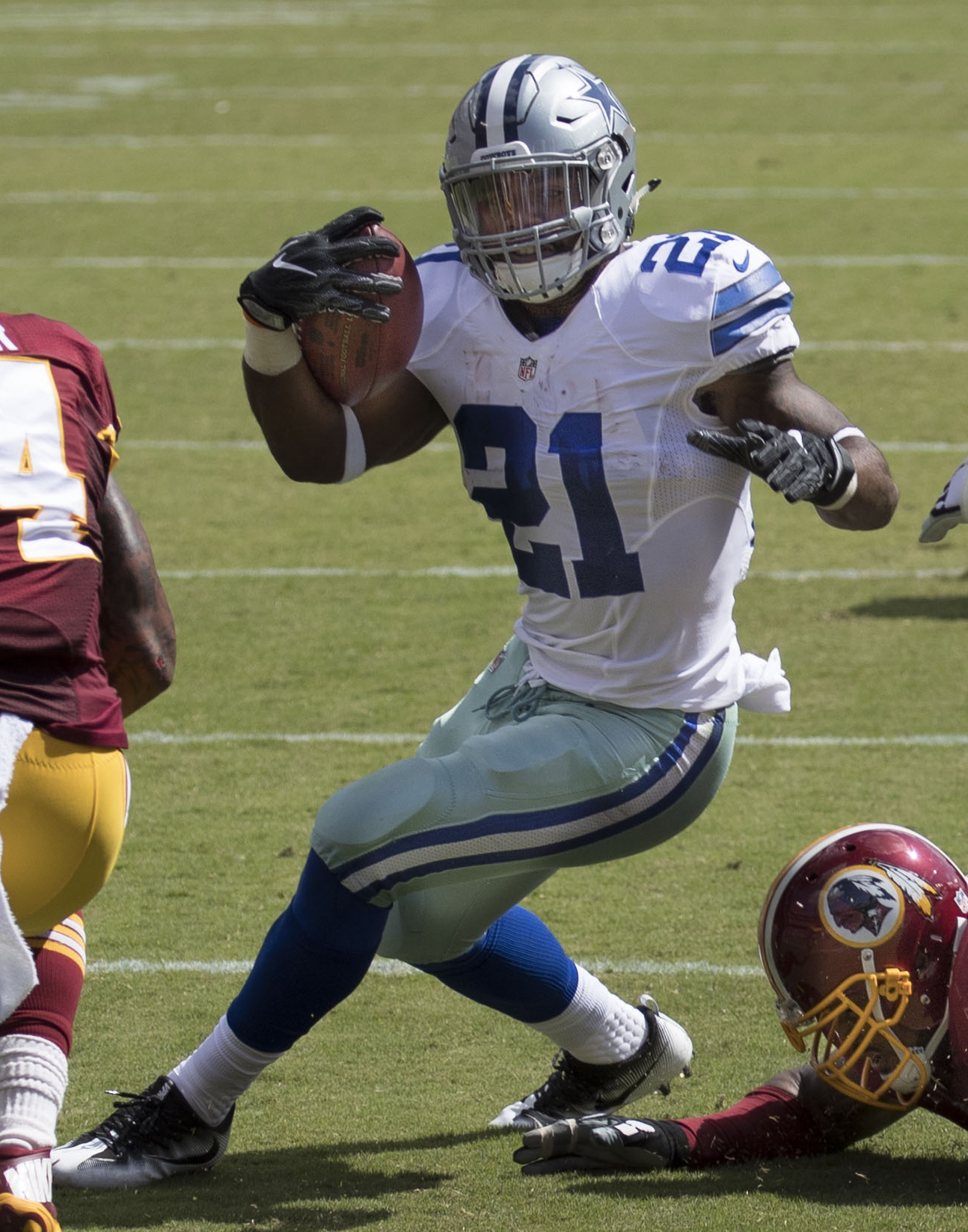
Elliott in 2016

Elliott was selected in the first round with the fourth overall pick by the Dallas Cowboys in the 2016 NFL draft on April 28, 2016. He was the first running back selected. Elliott was widely regarded as an early favorite for the 2016 Offensive Rookie of the Year while playing behind what many agreed upon as the NFL's most dominant offensive line leading up to the 2016 season. On May 18, Elliott signed his four-year rookie contract reportedly worth $24.9 million with a $16.3 million signing bonus.

Elliott was named the Cowboys' starting running back to begin the regular season, ahead of veterans Alfred Morris and Darren McFadden. During the narrow season-opening 20–19 loss to the Giants, he had 20 carries for 51 yards and his first NFL touchdown on an eight-yard run. In the next game against the Washington Redskins, Elliott had 21 carries for 83 yards and a touchdown, but also fumbled twice, losing one of them, yet the Cowboys prevailed on the road 27–23. The following week against the Chicago Bears on Sunday Night Football, he posted his first 100-yard game, rushing 30 times for 140 yards in the 31–17 victory.

During a Week 4 24–17 road victory over the San Francisco 49ers, Elliott had 23 carries for 138 yards and a touchdown. In the next game against the Cincinnati Bengals, he rushed 15 times for 134 yards and two touchdowns, including a 60-yard touchdown, during the 28–14 victory. The following week against the Green Bay Packers, Elliott continued his four-game streak with over 100 yards after recording 28 carries for 157 yards in the 30–16 road victory.

After the ninth game of the season against the Cleveland Browns, Elliott became the second Cowboys rookie to rush for more than 1,000 yards in a season, after Tony Dorsett achieved the mark in 1977. Elliott also became the third running back to rush for 1,000 yards after just the ninth game of his career, joining Adrian Peterson and Eric Dickerson.

During a Week 10 35–30 road victory over the Pittsburgh Steelers, Elliott recorded 209 scrimmage yards and three touchdowns, including his first NFL receiving touchdown on an 83-yard pass from fellow rookie Dak Prescott, and a 32-yard run for the game-winning touchdown with nine seconds left. In the next game against the Baltimore Ravens, Elliott rushed 25 times for 97 yards and passed Tony Dorsett's Cowboys rookie rushing record on his second carry during the 27–17 victory. The following week against the Redskins on Thanksgiving, Elliott had 20 carries for 97 yards and two touchdowns in the 31–26 victory.

During a narrow Week 13 17–15 road victory over the Minnesota Vikings on Thursday Night Football, Elliott had 20 carries for 86 yards and a touchdown. Two weeks later the Tampa Bay Buccaneers, he recorded 23 carries for 159 yards and a touchdown in the 26–20 victory. After scoring the touchdown, Elliott jumped into an oversized Salvation Army Red Kettle, an unusual touchdown celebration. Since 1997, the Dallas Cowboys Thanksgiving Day football game halftime show has traditionally kicked off the Red Kettle campaign. With that rushing touchdown, Elliott surpassed Tony Dorsett and Herschel Walker for the Cowboys rookie record. Because the Cowboys clinched the #1-seed in the NFC and home field advantage throughout the playoffs, Elliott rushed for 80 yards and two touchdowns during the Week 16 42–21 victory over the Detroit Lions and did not play in the regular-season finale against the Philadelphia Eagles.

Elliott finished his rookie year as the NFL's top rusher with 1,631 yards, which was the 47th best season all-time and the third most by a rookie (behind Eric Dickerson's 1,808 in 1983 and George Rogers' 1,674 in 1981) while also becoming the youngest player to reach 1,600 yards. Elliott finished third with 15 touchdowns behind LeGarrette Blount and David Johnson. He tied Mike Anderson, Clinton Portis, and Ickey Woods for the second most all-time by a rookie behind Eric Dickerson's 18. Elliott's 464 yards after contact ranked fourth among NFL running backs. Due to his successful season, Elliott was selected as a First-team All-Pro, and earned his first Pro Bowl, joining Dak Prescott as the first rookie running back and quarterback duo in NFL history to be selected. He was also selected to the PFWA All-Rookie Team and named PFWA NFL Rookie of the Year. Elliott was ranked seventh by his peers on the NFL Top 100 Players of 2017 and was the highest ranked running back.

In his first NFL playoff game, Elliott had 22 carries for 125 yards during a 34–31 loss to the Packers in the Divisional Round, joining Duane Thomas as the only Cowboy rookie to rush for over 100 yards in a playoff game.

==== 2017 season ====
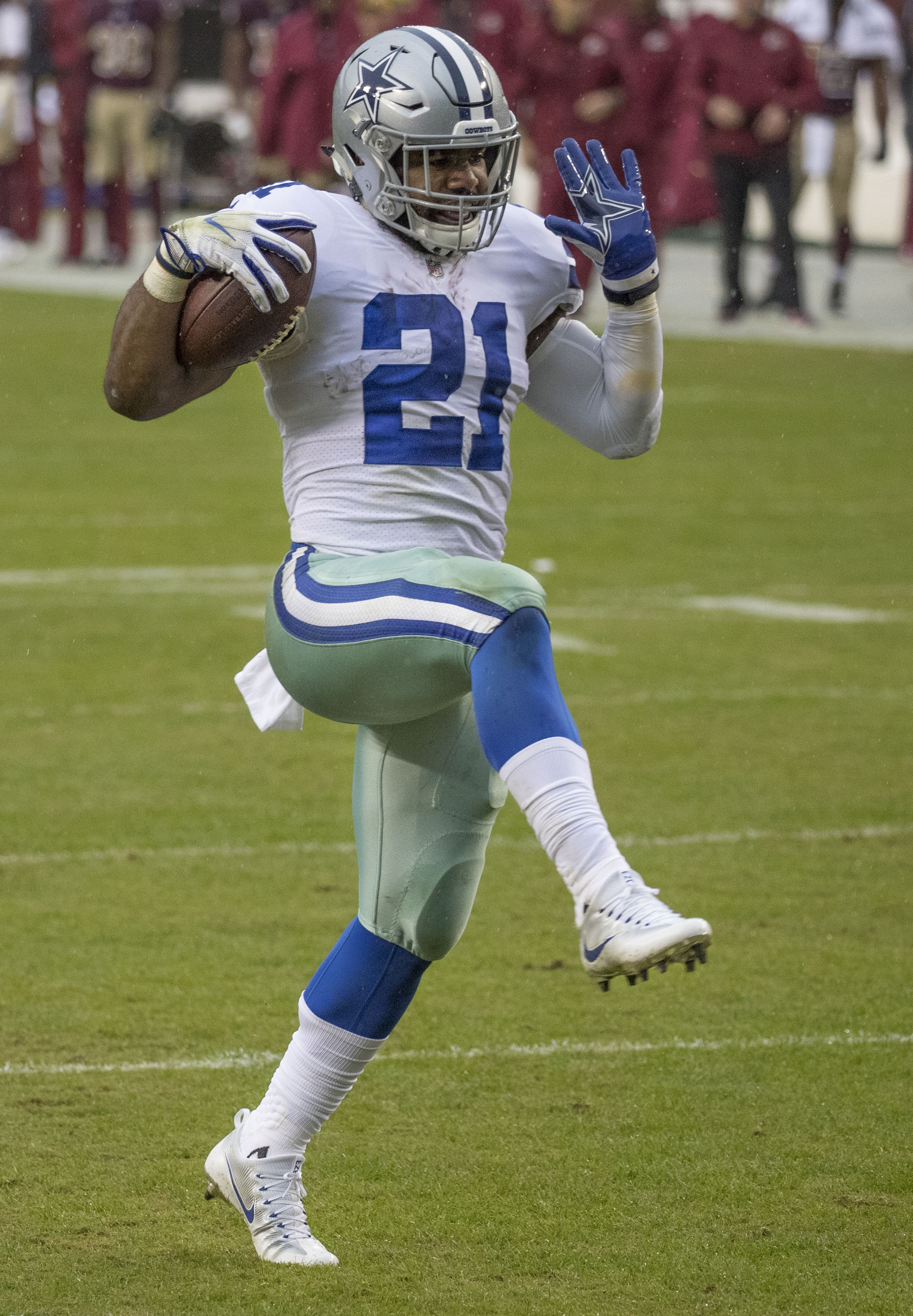
Elliott in 2017

On August 11, 2017, the NFL suspended Elliott for the first six games of the 2017 season for violating the personal conduct policy. His suspension stemmed from accusations of domestic violence against his ex-girlfriend on five occasions in 2016. NFL officials conducted a year-long investigation into the allegations, and though Elliott was never criminally charged, decided to suspend him. On August 16, Elliott announced that he would appeal the suspension. Although the suspension was upheld on September 6 by a league-appointed arbitrator, on September 8, a federal judge granted a request for injunction by the NFL Players Association (NFLPA), putting the suspension on hold indefinitely.

During the season-opening 19–3 victory over the Giants on Sunday Night Football, Elliott had 24 carries for 104 yards. In the next game against the Denver Broncos, he had the worst game of his career statistically, being held to eight yards on nine carries during the 42–17 road loss.

On October 12, 2017, the Fifth Circuit U.S. Court of Appeals announced that Elliot's suspension had been reinstated, meaning that he would have to serve the six-game suspension up from that point. Six days later, Elliott was granted a temporary restraining order, meaning that he would not have to serve his suspension from that point, allowing him to play in Week 7 against the 49ers. In that game, Elliott had 26 carries for 147 yards and two touchdowns to go along with a 72-yard touchdown reception during the 40–10 road victory. The following week against the Redskins, he rushed 33 times for 150 yards and two touchdowns in the 33–19 road victory.

On October 30, Judge Katherine Polk Failla of the New York Southern District Court, denied Elliott's request for a preliminary injunction, which reinstated the six-game suspension. The following day, the NFLPA filed an emergency motion for the injunction. On November 3, Elliott was once again granted a stay by the United States Court of Appeals for the Second Circuit, which delayed the suspension, allowing him to play in Week 9 against the Kansas City Chiefs. In that game, Elliott rushed 27 times for 93 yards and a touchdown during the 28–17 victory.

On November 9, the suspension was once again reinstated by the United States Court of Appeals for the Second Circuit. Three days later, Elliott decided to accept the suspension and leave the country to train for a little while. On November 15, he officially announced that he had withdrawn from another appeal attempt. During his suspension, Elliott had been training and rehabbing his hamstrings in Mexico before his reinstatement. Elliott returned in Week 16 during a must-win situation against the Seattle Seahawks, where he recorded 24 carries for 97 yards and four receptions for 21 yards, but the Cowboys lost 21–12 and were eliminated from playoff contention. In the regular season finale against the Eagles, Elliott had 27 carries for 103 yards and three receptions for 38 yards during the 6–0 shutout road victory.

Elliott finished his second professional season with 242 carries for 983 yards and seven touchdowns to go along with 26 receptions for 269 yards and two touchdowns in 10 games and starts. He was ranked 54th by his peers on the NFL Top 100 Players of 2018.

==== 2018 season ====
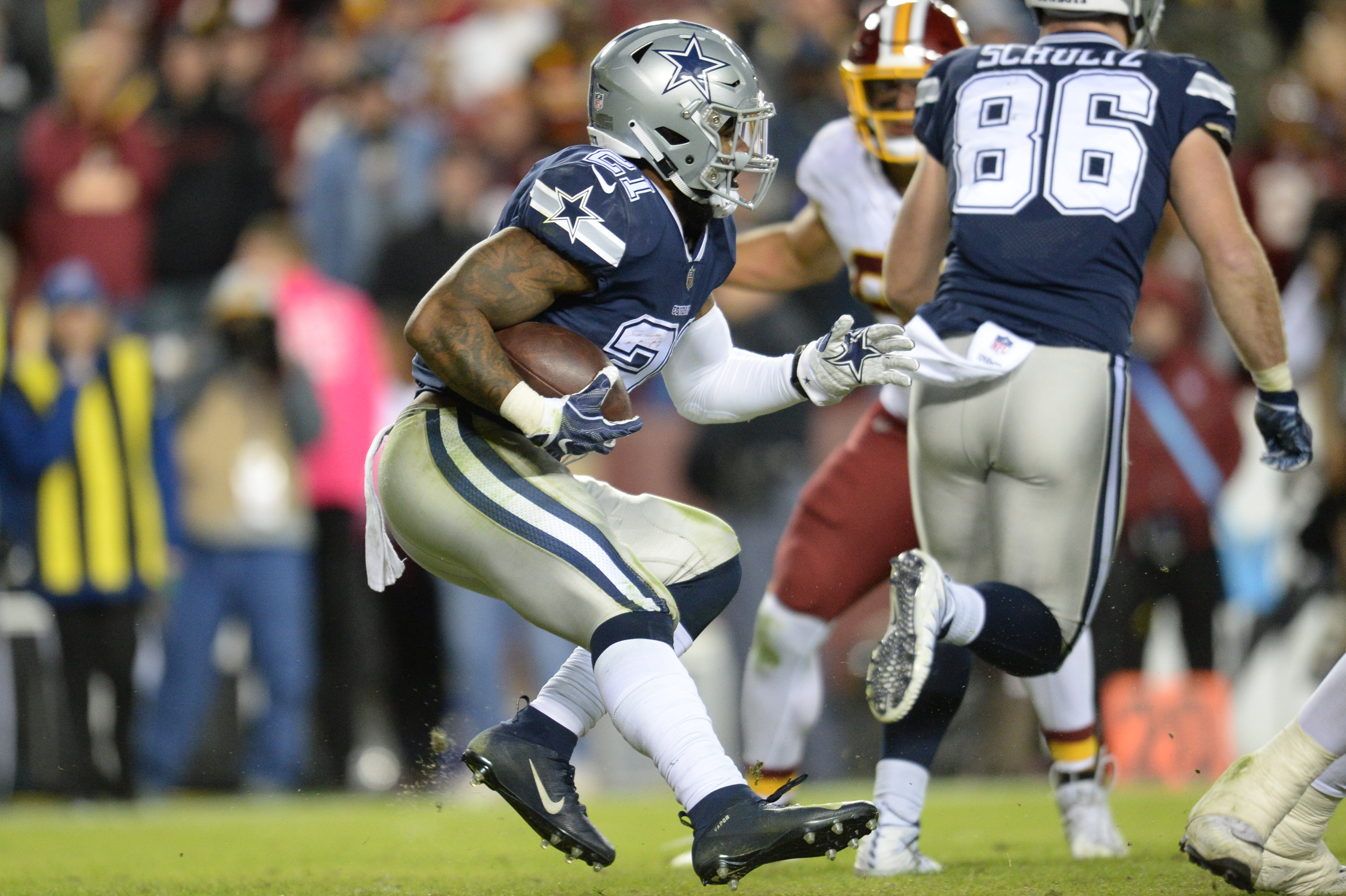
Elliott in 2018

During the season-opening 16–8 road loss to the Carolina Panthers, Elliott had 15 carries for 69 yards and a touchdown to go along with three receptions for 17 yards. In the next game against the Giants, he rushed 17 times for 78 yards and a touchdown during the 20–13 victory. The following week against the Seahawks, he recorded 16 carries for 127 yards and three receptions for 11 yards in the 24–13 road loss.

During Week 4 against the Lions, Elliott recorded 25 carries for 152 yards to go along with four receptions for 88 yards and a touchdown in the narrow 26–24 victory. Two weeks later against the Jacksonville Jaguars, he had 24 carries for 106 yards and a touchdown to go along with an 11-yard reception in the 40–7 victory, becoming the 12th Cowboy to reach 25 touchdowns on the ground as well as the fastest to do so, three games faster than Emmitt Smith.

During a Week 10 27–20 road victory over the Eagles, Elliott had 19 carries for 151 yards and a touchdown to go along with six receptions for 36 yards and a touchdown. He broke 150 yards rushing for the fifth time in his career, surpassing DeMarco Murray for third-most in franchise history. In the next game against the Atlanta Falcons, Elliott recorded 23 carries for 122 yards and a touchdown to go along with seven receptions for 79 yards during the 22–19 road victory, marking his fourth game over 200 scrimmage yards, tying him with DeMarco Murray and Emmitt Smith for most in franchise history. Elliott continued his success the following week against the Redskins on Thanksgiving, recording 26 carries for 121 yards and a touchdown in the 31–26 victory, eclipsing 1,000 yards on the year, the second time of his career, tied for third (along with DeMarco Murray and Calvin Hill) most in Cowboys' history.

During Week 13 against the New Orleans Saints on Thursday Night Football, Elliott recorded 23 carries for 75 yards to go along with six receptions for 60 yards and a touchdown in the 13–10 victory. In the next game against the Eagles, he had 28 carries for 113 yards and 12 receptions for 79 yards during the 29–23 overtime victory.

Elliott finished the 2018 season with 304 carries for 1,434 yards and six touchdowns to go along with 77 receptions for 567 yards and three touchdowns in 15 games and starts. He won the rushing title for the second time in three seasons. Elliott earned a second Pro Bowl nomination for his 2018 season.

The Cowboys finished atop the NFC East with a 10–6 and made the playoffs as the #4-seed for the NFC Playoffs. During the Wild Card Round against the Seattle Seahawks, Elliott recorded 26 carries for 137 yards and a touchdown to go along with four receptions for 32 yards in the narrow 24–22 victory. In the Divisional Round against the Los Angeles Rams, he had 20 carries for 47 yards and a touchdown to go along with two receptions for 19 yards during the 30–22 road loss. Elliott was ranked 18th by his fellow players on the NFL Top 100 Players of 2019.

==== 2019 season ====
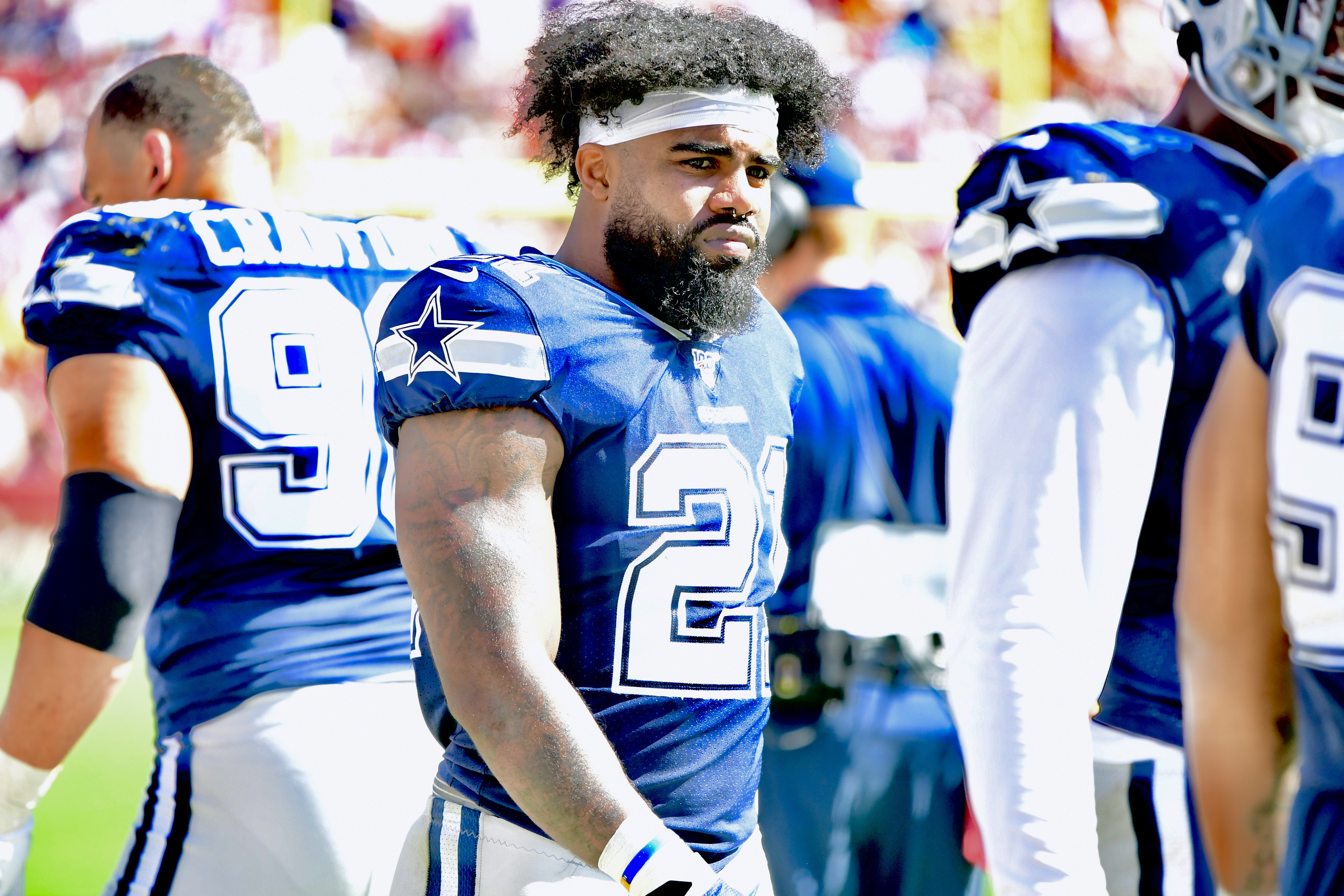
Elliott in 2019

On April 17, 2019, the Cowboys picked up the fifth-year option on Elliott's contract. However, he began holding out during training camp, demanding a contract extension. On September 4, Elliott signed a six-year extension with the Cowboys worth $90 million, with $50 million guaranteed, keeping him under contract through the 2026 season.

During the season-opening 35–17 victory over the Giants, Elliott had 13 carries for 53 yards and a touchdown to go along with a 10-yard reception. In the next game against the Redskins, he rushed 23 times for 111 yards and a touchdown during the 31–21 road victory. The following week against the Miami Dolphins, he recorded 19 carries for 125 yards and two receptions for 14 yards in the 31–6 victory.

During a narrow Week 4 12–10 road loss to the Saints on Sunday Night Football, Elliott had 18 carries for 35 yards and a touchdown to go along with six receptions for 30 yards. In the next game against the Packers, he recorded 12 carries for 62 yards and a touchdown to go along with two receptions for 29 yards during the 34–24 loss. The following week against the New York Jets, Elliott rushed 28 times for 105 yards and a touchdown and caught five passes for 48 yards in the 24–22 road loss.

During Week 7 against the Eagles on Sunday Night Football, he recorded 22 carries for 111 yards and a touchdown to go along with six receptions for 36 yards in the 37–10 victory. Following a Week 8 bye, the Cowboys faced the Giants on Monday Night Football. In that game, Elliott rushed 23 times for 139 yards during the 37–18 road victory. Two weeks later against the Lions, he had 16 carries for 45 yards and a touchdown to go along with two receptions for 28 yards in the 35–27 road victory.

During a Week 14 31–24 road loss to the Bears on Thursday Night Football, he rushed 19 times for 84 yards and two touchdowns while also reaching 1,000 rushing yards on the season. In the next game against the Rams, Elliott had 24 carries for 117 yards and two touchdowns to go along with three receptions for 43 yards during the 44–21 victory. During the regular-season finale against the Redskins, he recorded 18 carries for 122 yards and a touchdown and caught three passes for two yards and a touchdown during the 47–16 victory.

Elliott finished the 2019 season with 301 carries for 1,357 yards and 12 touchdowns to go along with 54 receptions for 420 yards and two touchdowns in 15 games and starts. Elliott earned his third Pro Bowl nomination for 2019. He was ranked 24th by his fellow players on the NFL Top 100 Players of 2020.

==== 2020 season ====
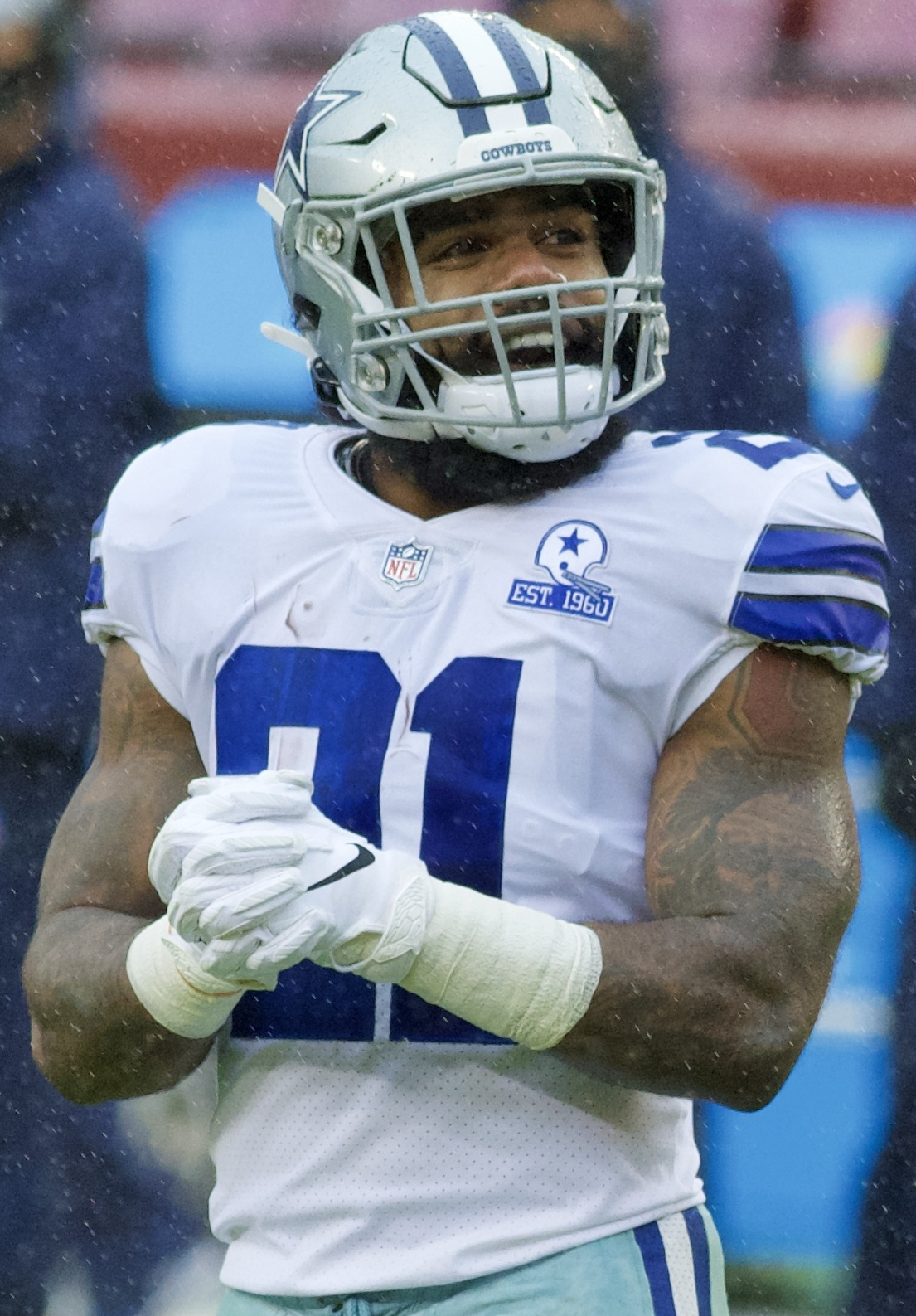
Elliott in 2020

During the season-opening 20–17 loss to the Rams on Sunday Night Football, Elliott recorded 22 carries for 96 yards and a touchdown to go along with three receptions for 31 yards and a touchdown. In the next game against the Falcons, he had 22 carries for 89 yards and a touchdown to go along with six receptions for 33 yards during the narrow 40–39 comeback victory. The following week against the Seahawks, Elliott rushed 14 times for 34 yards and a touchdown and caught six passes for 24 yards in the 38–31 road loss.

During Week 5 against the Giants, Elliott had 19 carries for 91 yards and two touchdowns to go along with a 14-yard reception in the 37–34 victory. During a Week 11 31–28 road victory over the Vikings, Elliott had his first 100-yard game of the season, recording 21 carries for 103 yards to go along with two receptions for 11 yards and a touchdown. Elliott missed his first career game due to injury in Week 15 against the 49ers, but returned the following week against the Eagles and finished the 37–17 victory with 19 carries for 105 yards and four receptions for 34 yards. During the regular season finale against the Giants, he rushed 14 times for 42 yards and a touchdown and caught three passes for 19 yards in the 23–19 road loss.

Elliott finished the 2020 season with 244 carries for 979 yards and six touchdowns to go along with 52 receptions for 338 yards and two touchdowns in 15 games and starts.

==== 2021 season ====
On August 27, 2021, the Cowboys restructured Elliott's contract, converting $8.6 million of his base salary for the upcoming season into a signing bonus to save some salary cap space.

Despite dealing with lingering knee and ankle injuries during the majority of the season, Elliott was still able to start in all 17 games and rushed 237 times for 1,002 yards and 10 touchdowns while also recording 47 receptions for 287 yards and two touchdowns. He had two games going over the 100-yard mark and four games with multiple touchdowns.

During the Wild Card Round against the 49ers, Elliott rushed 12 times for 31 yards in the 23–17 loss. After the game, it was revealed that Elliott was playing with a partially torn PCL, which he suffered during the Week 4 36–28 victory over the Panthers.

==== 2022 season ====
Elliot finished the 2022 season with 231 carries for 876 yards and 12 touchdowns to go along with 17 receptions for 92 yards in 15 games and 14 starts. Seven of his 12 rushing touchdowns were scored from the one-yard line, and 10 were scored from within six yards of the goal-line.

In the Divisional Round against the 49ers, Elliott rushed 10 times for 26 yards and played center for one play during the 19–12 road loss.

The Cowboys released Elliott on March 15, 2023.

=== New England Patriots ===
On August 16, 2023, Elliott signed a one-year, $3 million contract with the New England Patriots. Patriots offensive coordinator Bill O'Brien stated that Elliott would be used primarily in third-down and red zone situations behind starter Rhamondre Stevenson. During a Week 14 21–18 road victory over the Steelers, Elliott had 140 scrimmage yards and a receiving touchdown.

Elliott finished the 2023 season with 184 carries for 642 yards and three touchdowns to go along with 51 receptions for 313 yards and two touchdowns in 17 games and five starts.

=== Dallas Cowboys (second stint) ===
On April 30, 2024, Elliott signed a one-year, $2 million contract to return to the Cowboys.

During the season opener against the Cleveland Browns, Elliott rushed 10 times for 40 yards with a touchdown and added two catches for nine yards, which helped contribute to the 33–17 road victory. On December 31, 2024, the Cowboys and Elliott agreed to mutually part ways after Elliott requested to be released in order for him to pursue the chance of joining a playoff bound team, as the Cowboys failed to qualify for the playoffs. Elliott finished the 2024 season with 74 carries for 226 yards and three touchdowns to go along with 12 receptions for 69 yards in 15 games and two starts.

=== Los Angeles Chargers ===
On January 6, 2025, Elliott signed to the Los Angeles Chargers practice squad. He was not chosen to be elevated to the active roster for the Wild Card Round against the Houston Texans. On January 20, Elliott's practice squad contract with the Chargers officially expired.

== Career statistics ==
Legend
	Led the league
**Bold**	Career high

=== NFL ===
==== Regular season ====
Year	Team	Games		Rushing					Receiving					Fumbles	
Year	Team	GP	GS	Att	Yds	Avg	Lng	TD	Rec	Yds	Avg	Lng	TD	Fum	Lost
2016	DAL	15	15	**322**	**1,631**	**5.1**	**60T**	**15**	32	363	**11.3**	**83T**	1	5	1
2017	DAL	10	10	242	983	4.1	30	7	26	269	10.3	72T	2	1	1
2018	DAL	15	15	304	1,434	4.7	41	6	**77**	**567**	7.4	38T	**3**	**6**	1
2019	DAL	16	16	301	1,357	4.5	33T	12	54	420	7.8	27	2	3	2
2020	DAL	15	15	244	979	4.0	31	6	52	338	6.5	19	2	**6**	**5**
2021	DAL	17	17	237	1,002	4.2	47	10	47	287	6.1	21	2	1	1
2022	DAL	15	14	231	876	3.8	27	12	17	92	5.4	31	0	0	0
2023	NE	17	5	184	642	3.5	17	3	51	313	6.1	23	2	2	1
2024	DAL	15	2	74	226	3.1	11	3	12	69	5.8	15	0	1	1
Career		135	109	2,139	9,130	4.3	60	74	368	2,718	7.4	83	14	25	13

==== Postseason ====
Year	Team	Games		Rushing					Receiving					Fumbles	
Year	Team	GP	GS	Att	Yds	Avg	Lng	TD	Rec	Yds	Avg	Lng	TD	Fum	Lost
2016	DAL	1	1	22	125	**5.7**	22	0	1	−2	−2.0	−2	0	0	0
2018	DAL	2	2	**46**	**184**	4.0	**44**	**2**	**6**	**51**	**8.5**	**12**	0	0	0
2021	DAL	1	1	12	31	2.6	9	0	1	0	0.0	0	0	0	0
2022	DAL	2	2	23	53	2.3	9	0	3	16	5.3	9	0	0	0
Career		6	6	103	393	3.8	44	2	11	65	5.9	12	0	0	0

=== College ===
Season	Team	Games		Rushing				Receiving			
Season	Team	GP	GS	Att	Yds	Avg	TD	Rec	Yds	Avg	TD
2013	Ohio State	7	0	30	262	**8.7**	2	3	23	7.7	**1**
2014	Ohio State	15	15	273	**1,878**	6.9	18	**28**	**220**	**7.9**	0
2015	Ohio State	13	13	**289**	1,821	6.3	**23**	27	206	7.6	0
Total		35	28	595	3,961	6.7	43	58	449	7.7	1

== Personal life ==
Elliott bought his parents, Dawn and Stacy Elliott, a new house after signing his rookie contracts. He studied marketing at Ohio State University.

In August 2020, Elliott became a shareholder of OnCore Golf Technology, Inc., a manufacturer of golf balls based in Buffalo, New York.

In May 2021, Elliott was cited by police after one of his dogs bit and injured two people in his Frisco, Texas, neighborhood.
