= 1941 National Challenge Cup =

Football cup championship in the United States

- Dewar Challenge Cup

Tournament details
- Country: United States
- Dates: 08 December 1940 – 11 May 1941

Final positions
- Champions: Pawtucket F.C.
- Runners-up: Detroit Chrysler
- Semifinalists: Gallatin-Dunlevy; German Hungarian FC

The 1941 National Challenge Cup was the 28th edition of the United States Football Association's annual open cup. Today, the tournament is known as the Lamar Hunt U.S. Open Cup. Teams from the American Soccer League II competed in the tournament, based on qualification methods in their base region.

Pawtucket F.C. from Pawtucket, Rhode Island won the tournament for first time defeating, Detroit Chrysler of Detroit, Michigan in the process.
