= OnCore Golf =

American golf ball manufacturer

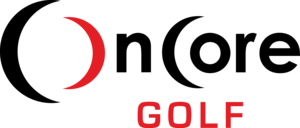
- Company type: Private
- Industry: Sports equipment
- Founded: 2009; 17 years ago
- Founder: Steve Coulton and Bret Blakely
- Headquarters: Buffalo, New York, U.S.
- Key people: Keith Blakely (Chairman)
- Products: Golf balls
- Website: oncoregolf.com

OnCore Golf Technology, Inc. is an American manufacturer of golf balls headquartered in Buffalo, New York.

== History ==
Founded in 2009 by Steve Coulton and Bret Blakely, the company is known for creating the first and only USGA-conforming hollow-metal-core ball in 2012. OnCore has since released several other golf ball products, including the ELIXR, VERO X1, and VERO X2 tour performance golf balls. OnCore has secured the sponsorship rights of the Gateway Tour. The company relies primarily on word-of-mouth marketing for advertising and conducts much of its sales online. Professional athletes such as Ezekiel Elliott and Josh Allen have become shareholders in the company.

=== Sports entertainment centers ===
In 2019, OnCore announced plans for a privately funded $30-million year-round sports entertainment complex along the Buffalo River on a former brownfield near Riverworks and Canalside. The facility was to include a 72-hitting-bay golf entertainment center with food and beverages, 350 parking spaces, a 120-room hotel with meeting and event space, and year-round access to the river, in addition to attractions for children. This project as planned was delayed due to the COVID-19 pandemic, then abandoned in 2023, with the effects of the pandemic on the economy cited as a primary reason. OnCore will instead build a smaller entertainment facility without the hotel in South Buffalo, with a similar facility also planned for Knoxville, Tennessee.
