= East Lovejoy, Buffalo =

Coordinates: 42°53′22″N 78°48′46″W

Lovejoy
- Neighborhood
- Lovejoy District
- Interactive map of Lovejoy
- Country: United States
- State: New York
- City: Buffalo, New York
- Named for: Sarah Lovejoy

Government
  - Council Member: Bryan J. Bollman
- Time zone: Eastern (EST)

The Lovejoy District is a neighborhood in Buffalo, New York. Lovejoy is the easternmost portion of the city, running along the city's border with Cheektowaga. The councilman of the area in 2025 is Bryan J. Bollman.

Lovejoy is named after Sarah Lovejoy, an American killed in December 1813 during a British-Indian raid on Buffalo during Niagara Frontier warfare of the War of 1812.

== Ethnicity ==
As Buffalo developed as an industrial city, Lovejoy became a destination for European immigrants and later, migrants from the rural South. In the 1830s, it was a primarily German neighborhood. With later demographic changes and immigration from southern and eastern Europe, it became a neighborhood of Italians. In the 20th century, African Americans and Hispanics moved in as well. The most recent 21st-century arrivals have been Arab and Asian, reflecting changing immigration patterns. The neighborhood is still dominated numerically by Italian Americans.

== Schools ==
PS #43 is the primary school in the East Lovejoy area, which many student-age children attend. It has architectural and significant history. Started in 1831 by Joseph Churchyard, the man who owned the land, the school created an annex on East Lovejoy and Benzinger streets. This is the current school #43. Built to accommodate 600 ethnic German children living in the area, the school had 49 classrooms, two gymnasiums, a cafeteria, and other features. In 1926, the number of students attending was 1,662. Recently, the school underwent a $56 million construction project; another building was constructed on the former parking lot and connected to the old one. PS 43 is now one of the Buffalo Public Community Schools.

St. Agnes Catholic parish school operated in Lovejoy for about 100 years before its close in 2009. The diocese did not have the funds for needed upgrades. It opened in the 1800s.

== Parks ==
Among the many parks in the Lovejoy area are Hennepin Park, the main and largest park, including a recently redone community center; Davey Park, and Moreland Field.

Buffalo Color Park was built on a remediated brownfield site formerly occupied by Schoellkopf, Hartford & Hanna Company. It is home to Queen City Field, the Heritage Discovery Center, and The Powerhouse.

== Iron Island ==
"Iron Island" is a popular nickname for the area of Lovejoy that is almost entirely surrounded by train tracks (Tracks run along William Street, Broadway, many go through the Buffalo Central Terminal, and across William Street). The area also had a CSX building located on N. Ogden Street, which was destroyed in a large fire in July 2012.

== Street Name Change ==
Originally Lovejoy Street ran from the Buffalo/Cheektowaga border heading West to Emslie St. The street was split in two after the opening of the Buffalo Central Terminal in 1929. The Western end of Lovejoy St. from Memorial Dr. (formerly Lindburgh Dr.) to Emslie St. was renamed "Paderewski Dr." and the Eastern end of Lovejoy St. from Central Ave. to the Buffalo/Cheektowaga border was renamed "East Lovejoy St.".

== See also ==
- Neighborhoods of Buffalo, New York
