= Reid Ferguson =

American football player (born 1994)

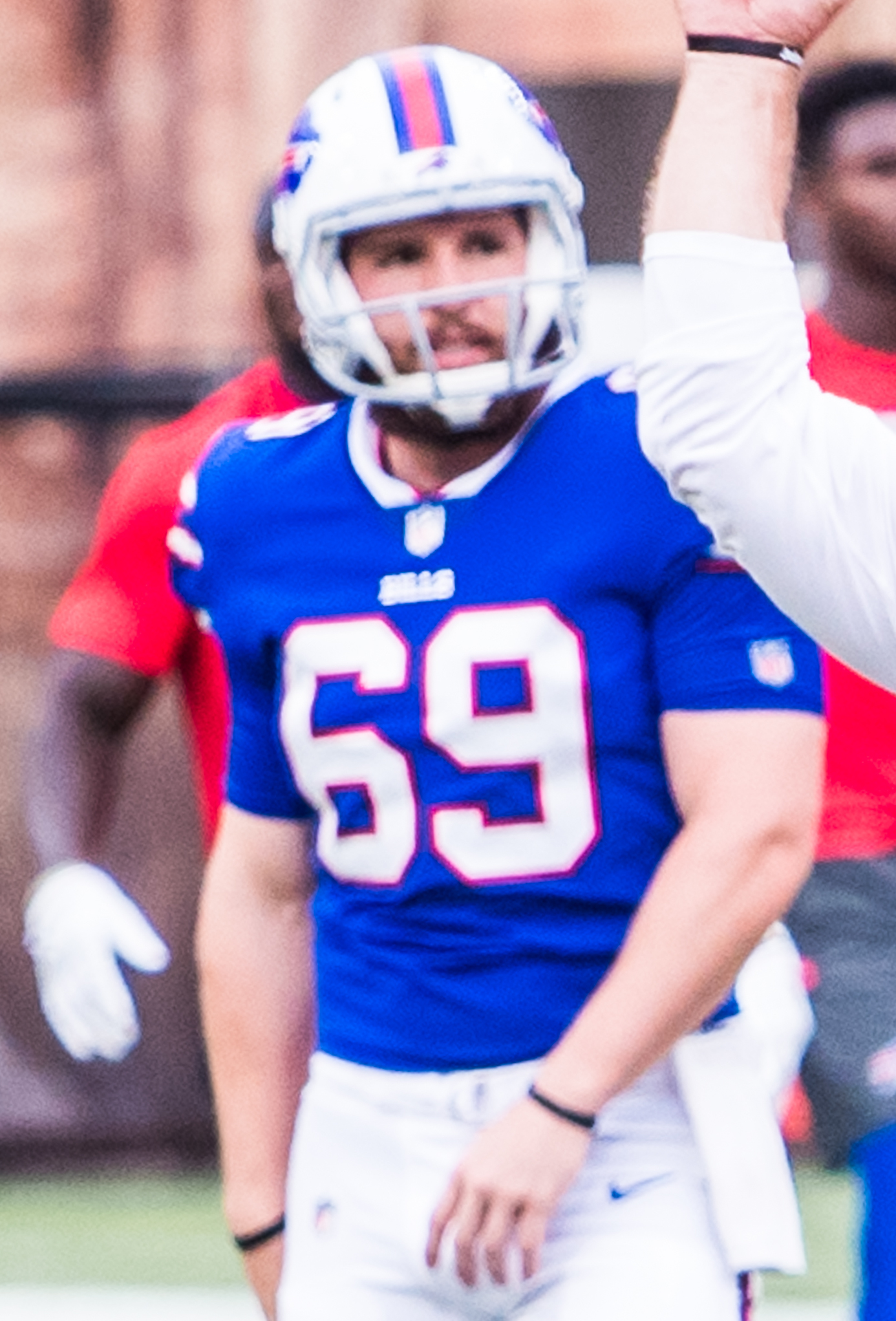
- Ferguson with the Buffalo Bills in 2018

No. 69 – Buffalo Bills
- Position: Long snapper
- Roster status: Active

Personal information
- Born: March 24, 1994 (age 32); Stanley, Idaho, U.S.
- Listed height: 6 ft 1 in (1.85 m)
- Listed weight: 235 lb (107 kg)

Career information
- High school: Buford (Buford, Georgia)
- College: LSU (2012–2015)
- NFL draft: 2016: undrafted

Career history
- Buffalo Bills (2016–present)

Career NFL statistics as of Week 8, 2026
- Games played: 155
- Total tackles: 15
- Stats at Pro Football Reference

Chandler Reid Ferguson (born March 24, 1994) is an American professional football long snapper for the Buffalo Bills of the National Football League (NFL). He played college football for the LSU Tigers.

== Professional career ==
Pre-draft measurables
Height	Weight	Arm length	Hand span	Wingspan	40-yard dash	10-yard split	20-yard split	20-yard shuttle	Three-cone drill	Vertical jump	Broad jump	Bench press
6 ft 1 in (1.85 m)	235 lb (107 kg)	30 1/8 in (0.77 m)	9 7/8 in (0.25 m)	6 ft 2 7/8 in (1.90 m)	5.05 s	1.74 s	2.91 s	4.57 s	7.51 s	27.5 in (0.70 m)	8 ft 8 in (2.64 m)	15 reps
All values from Pro Day

Ferguson was signed by the Buffalo Bills as an undrafted free agent on May 2, 2016. He was waived on August 30, 2016. He was signed to the practice squad on November 2, 2016. He signed a reserve/future contract with the Bills on January 2, 2017. Ferguson was named the Bills starting long snapper for 2017, where he played in all 16 games.

On January 28, 2019, Ferguson signed a three-year contract extension with the Bills through the 2021 season.

On May 28, 2021, Ferguson signed another three-year contract extension with the Bills through the 2024 season.

In 2022, Ferguson became the longest active tenured Bills player after defensive end Jerry Hughes signed with the Houston Texans.

On March 8, 2025, Ferguson signed a four-year, $6.5 million contract extension with Buffalo.

== Personal life ==
Ferguson has a brother, Blake Ferguson, who played for the Miami Dolphins for five seasons and is also a long snapper.

He is an avid soccer fan, and is part of the ownership groups for both Swansea City A.F.C. and Buffalo Pro Soccer.
