= Daniel W. Streeter =

American writer (1883–1964)

- Born: November 22, 1883; Highland Park, Illinois
- Died: July 27, 1964 (aged 80); Buffalo, New York
- Education: The Hill School; Harvard College (S.B. 1907)
- Occupations: Hunter, adventurer and author
- Known for: Arctic Rodeo
- Spouse: Gertrude Van Dolfson Norton
- Children: Daniel Barton Streeter
- Parent(s): Harvey Benjamin Streeter; Fannie Barton Chamberlain

Daniel Willard Streeter (22 November 1883 – 27 July 1964), was an American hunter, adventurer and writer active in the 1920s, who lived in Buffalo, New York.

== Early life ==
Streeter was born in Highland Park, Lake County Illinois, the son of Harvey Benjamin Streeter and his wife Fannie Barton Streeter (née Chamberlain). He was educated at The Hill School, Pottstown, Pennsylvania, and Harvard College, graduating in 1907.

== Career ==
After graduating from Harvard in 1907, he joined Buffalo Weaving & Belting Co., in Buffalo, New York, becoming the firm's treasurer and earning the moniker of "once a cotton manufacturer." There is little information available about his life other than a long list of club and society memberships, which suggest that he was a conscientious objector during World War I. Paradoxically, he claimed memberships in both the National Woman Suffrage Association and the Society for the Opposition of Women's Suffrage.

He wrote several facetious travel books, including Denatured Africa (1926), and Camels! (1927), which describes a hunting safari in Sudan near the Blue Nile and the Dinder River, and An Arctic Rodeo (1929). All three books were published by G. P. Putnam's Sons and contain period photography taken in Africa.

=== Arctic Rodeo ===
Arctic Rodeo is about a trip sponsored by the publisher George Putnam on the schooner Ernestina to the Arctic regions around Greenland and Baffin Bay. He describes the adventures of sailing on the crowded little ship, hunting in the Arctic with brave Inuit in their kayaks, the problems of navigating, the interactions with and lifestyles of Inuit, and the Danish government officials stationed in Greenland.

== Personal life ==
He married Gertrude Van Dolfson Norton on May 31, 1908, in Buffalo, New York. The couple resided at 770 Lafayette Avenue in Buffalo, New York. Norton was the daughter of Porter Norton, granddaughter of Charles Davis Norton and Jeannette (née Phelps) Norton, great-granddaughter of Oliver Phelps III, 2x great-granddaughter of Oliver Leicester Phelps, and 3x great-granddaughter of Oliver Phelps and Elizabeth "Betsey" Law Sherman. Sherman was the granddaughter of American founding father Roger Sherman. Street and Norton had:

- Daniel Barton Streeter (1909–1994), who married Frances "Fanny" Goodyear (1914–1975), daughter of Bradley Goodyear, in 1949. Goodyear was previously married to Prince Ludwig Della Torre e Tasso (1908–1985), the son of Prince Alessandro della Torre e Tasso, 1st Duke of Castel Duino from 1939 to 1948. Goodyear's grandfather was industrialist Charles W. Goodyear, president of the Great Southern Lumber Company and Buffalo and Susquehanna Railroad. After Goodyear's death, Streeter married Elizabeth V. Clemson, the granddaughter of the George N. Clemson, inventor of the hack saw blade. Clemson had previously been married to Thomas Dewitt Vander Voort.

Streeter died on July 27, 1964, in Buffalo.

== Published works ==
- Denatured Africa (1926)
- Camels! (1927)
- An Arctic Rodeo (1929)
