= Goodyear =

Goodyear may relate to:

== Companies ==
- Edward Goodyear, a florist company in London
- The Goodyear Tire and Rubber Company, named for inventor of vulcanization, Charles Goodyear
- Lumber and railway companies owned by lawyer and businessman Charles W. Goodyear, including:
  - Goodyear Lumber Company
  - Goodyear Redwood Company (1916–1932) which owned a mill in Elk, Mendocino County, California

== People ==
- Goodyear (surname)
- Goodyear family
  - Anson Conger Goodyear, businessman; leader of the American National Theater and Academy
  - Charles Goodyear, inventor of rubber vulcanization and the namesake (not owner, however) of The Goodyear Rubber and Tire Company
  - Charles W. Goodyear, lawyer and businessman; owner of lumber and railway companies
  - Charles Waterhouse "Chip" Goodyear IV, business executive at BHP, a mining and metals company
  - Frank H. Goodyear, brother of Charles W. Goodyear; also a businessman
  - Stephen Goodyear, founder of the New Haven Colony and its Deputy Governor from 1643 to 1658
- Miles Goodyear, a trapper in the 1800s

== Places ==
- Goodyear, Arizona, a city in the United States
  - Goodyear Ballpark, a baseball field owned by the city of Goodyear
  - Phoenix Goodyear Airport, a public airport nearby the city of Goodyear
- Goodyear Village, Arizona, of the Gila River Indian Community
- Goodyear Airdock, located in Akron, Ohio
- Goodyear Block, a commercial building in Manchester, Michigan
- Goodyear Polymer Center, a research center of the University of Akron
- Goodyear Thunderdome, motor racing circuit in Melbourne, Australia

== Sports ==
- Goodyear F.C., a football club in Northern Ireland
- Goodyear Centennials, a baseball team in Goodyear, Arizona
- Goodyear Eagles, a cricket team in South Africa now known as the Knights
- Goodyear League, a European basketball league now known as the Adriatic Basketball Association
- Goodyear Silents, a semi-pro football team of deaf players, from 1915 to 1927
- Detroit Bright's Goodyears, a minor league ice hockey team from 1945 to 1949

== Other uses ==
- Charles Goodyear Medal, award recognizing scientists in the rubber industry
- Goodyear MPP, a supercomputer built by Goodyear Aerospace in 1983
- Goodyear welt, a durable method of shoe construction invented by Charles Goodyear Jr.
