= Charles W. Goodyear House =

Historic house in New York, United States

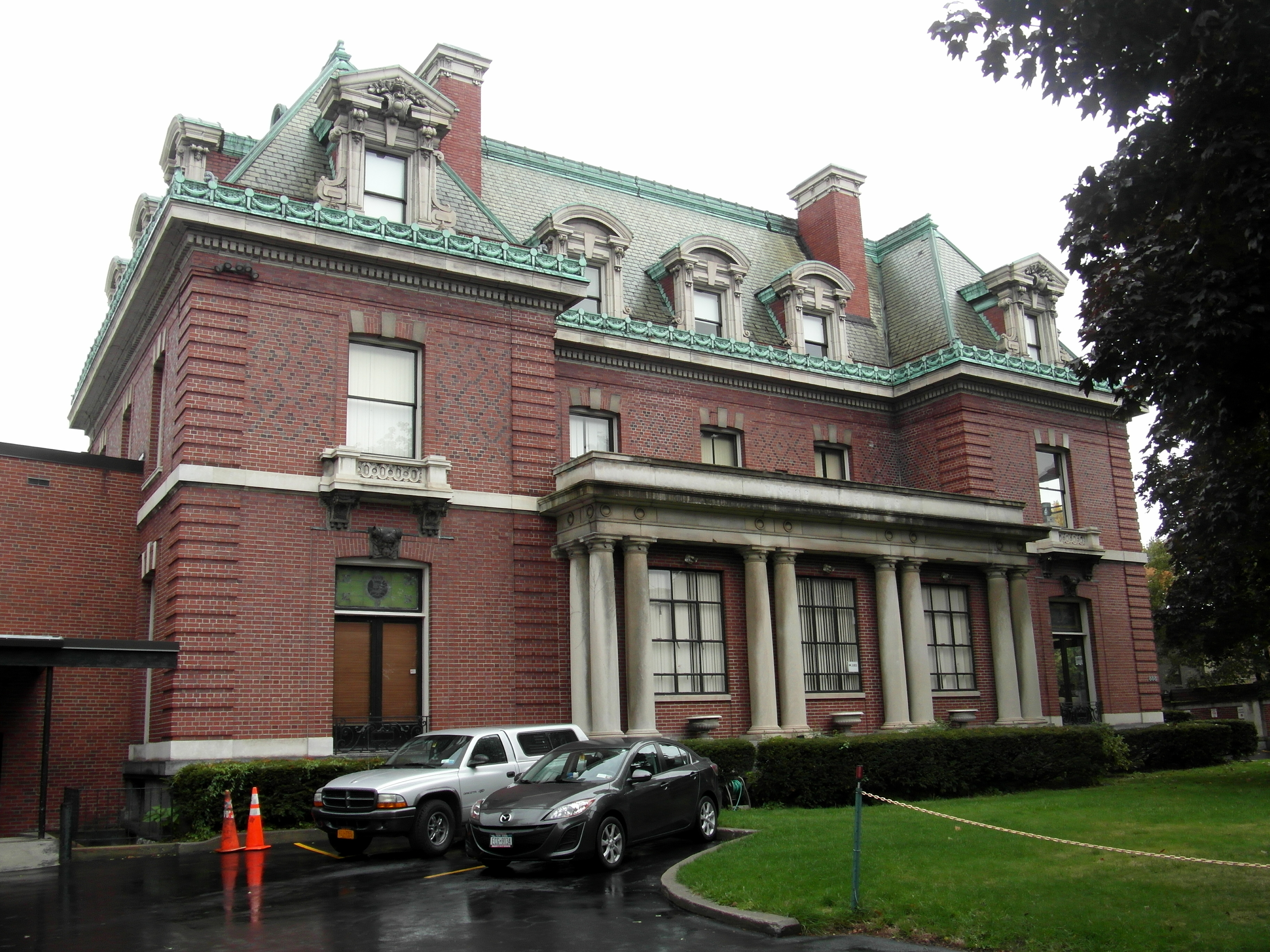
- Charles W. Goodyear House in 2012

General information
- Type: Brick
- Architectural style: Châteauesque
- Location: 888 Delaware Avenue, Buffalo, NY
- Completed: 1903

Design and construction
- Architect: Green & Wicks

The Charles W. Goodyear House is located at 888 Delaware Avenue in Buffalo, New York, part of the Delaware Avenue Historic District, a federally designated historic district listed on the National Register of Historic Places since 1974. The Châteauesque house was designed by prominent Buffalo architect Edward Green, of the Buffalo architecture firm Green & Wicks, and was completed in 1903 at a cost of $500,000 (equivalent to $17,917,000 in 2025). The home was built for Charles and Ella Goodyear. Goodyear was a founder and head of several companies including the Buffalo and Susquehanna Railroad, Great Southern Lumber Company, and the New Orleans Great Northern Railroad Company, as well as a director of Marine National Bank, and General Railway Signal.

== House ==
=== Exterior ===
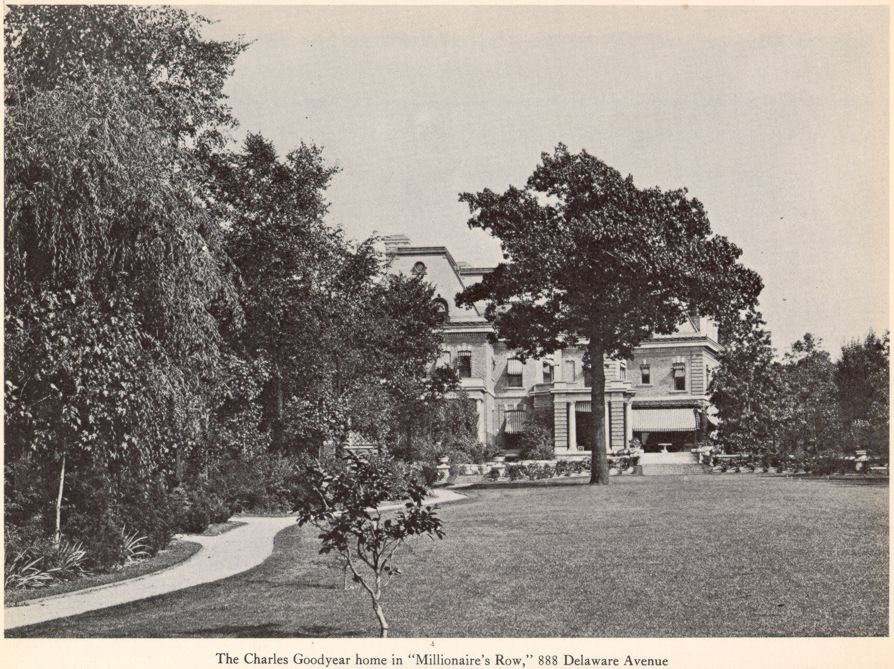
The Charles W. Goodyear home at 888 Delaware Avenue in Buffalo

The exterior of the two and a half story house is brick trimmed with stone. The mansard roof includes a row of dormers with pedimented tops with a festooned motif that runs along the roofline above a dentilled cornice. The principal entrance is on the north (right) side of the house denoted by a large arched doorway, bordered on each side by stone urns. The east façade facing Delaware Avenue has a one-story porch with columns, that was later bricked in.

=== Interior ===
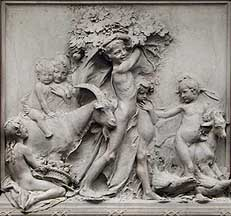
"Life" by Karl Bitter

The walls of the main hall are covered with red Italian brocade (woven fabric) and with pilasters and cove (concave-profile) moldings of carved American walnut. Over the mantle of the marble fireplace in the main hall is a six-foot marble relief, weighing two tons, called "Life" by Karl Bitter. The relief won the gold medal at the Saint Louis Exposition, 1904 and is placed on a foundation extending to the cellar.

The dining room of the house features wood paneling with multiple stained glass windows, triglyphs with guttae below in the frieze, and carved bound laurel leaves in the corner cabinet featuring brass festoons and bellflowers. At the time the Goodyear's lived in the house, the dining room was furnished with a table, sideboard, and 12 chairs of solid Honduras mahogany, purported to have cost $7,000 (equivalent to $251,000 in 2025) in 1903. The dining room is connected to the breakfast room, the palm room, and the loggia which has a view of the gardens and the lawns beyond. The library and hallways of the house are also covered in the intricately carved American walnut.

Though the home is only two and a half stories, it has five levels: basement, ground floor, first bedroom floor, second bedroom floor, and attic. A spiral staircase with a wrought-iron balustrade and an oak hand rail snakes through three of the floors, from the ground to the second bedroom floors. The House was built with eleven bedrooms, each with a marble fireplace and adjoining marble bath, and an elevator. The rooms of Charles' daughter, the late Mrs. Arnold B. Watson, featured a large sitting room covered with a light blue brocade and woodwork painted with at least 10 coats of ivory enamel.

== Significance ==
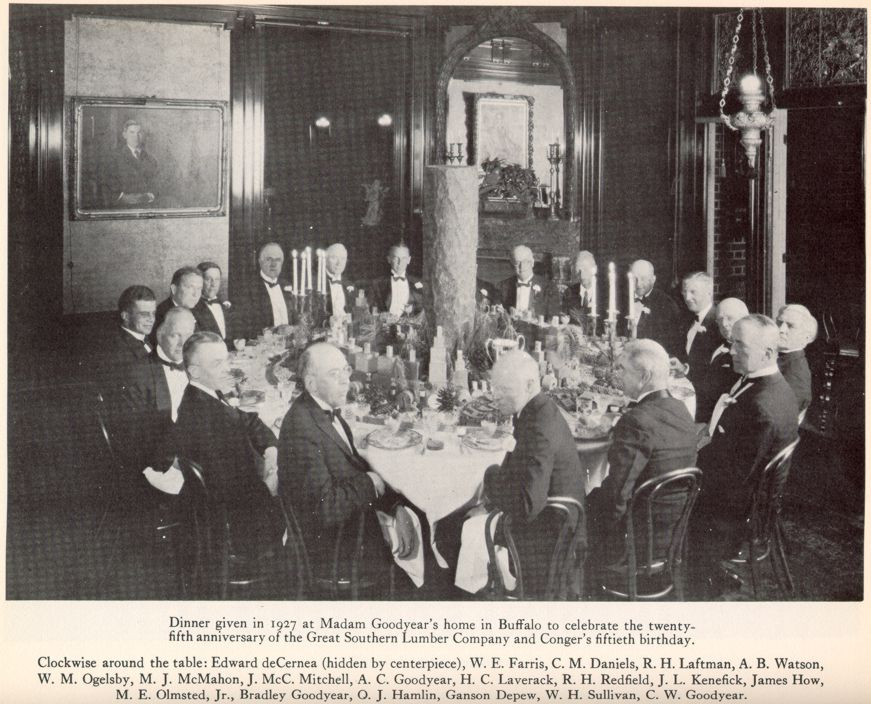
25th anniversary of the Great Southern Lumber Company (and Anson Goodyear's fiftieth birthday) celebrated at the House

In October 1919, when King Albert I of Belgium, Queen Elisabeth of Bavaria, and their son Prince Leopold took an official visit to the United States, they visited Buffalo. During their visit, they were entertained as guests of Charles' wife Ella Portia Conger Goodyear in the House.

The Charles W. Goodyear House is in the Delaware Avenue Historic District, a federally designated historic district listed on the National Register of Historic Places since 1974. The two block-long historic district is only a fraction of the former "Millionaires' Row" of Delaware Avenue.

In Anson Goodyear's (Charles W. Goodyear's son) unpublished manuscript, he wrote, "Delaware Avenue that mattered began at Niagara Square with the house of Millard Fillmore and ended at Gates Circle…" The Charles W. Goodyear House was in the center of this path. He went on to say "The Delaware Avenue of my early days was the champion residential street of the United States. Further west in Cleveland, Euclid Avenue had some pretensions, but we did not admit a great rivalry. The great elms along the way towered over green stretches of lawn, some imposing mansions...and a coterie of curious characters."

== Additional Buildings ==
In addition to the main house, there is the Carriage house and a power building for coal furnaces. It was purported that during the winter, the Goodyear House required up to one and a half tons of coal per day to generate sufficient heat. The power plant is connected to the house by a four foot wide tunnel.

== Subsequent Owners ==
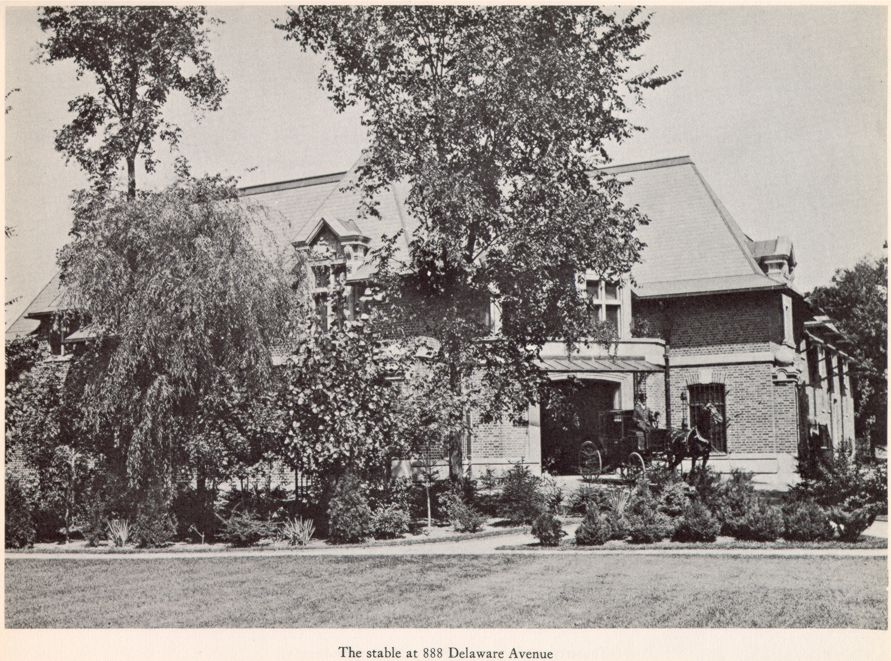
The stable at 888 Delaware Avenue in Buffalo

In 1940, shortly after Mrs. Goodyear's death, the mansion was sold to the "Hospital Service Corporation and the Western New York Medical plan," also known as the Blue Cross Corporation. At the time, it was reported that "with the exception of the kitchen and pantries and a few of the bedroom partitions, the house will not be changed by the hospital corporation."

In 1950, the house was sold to the Roman Catholic Diocese of Buffalo for $85,000 (equivalent to $1,137,000 in 2025), at which point it became the "Bishop McMahon High School." The first floor rooms including the den, living room, solarium, billiard room, dining room, in addition to the 11 bedrooms were converted to classrooms. The bedrooms adjoining bathrooms were converted into locker rooms for the students and the kitchen was converted to the senior class room.

In 1988, the house was again sold, this time to the Women & Children's Hospital of Buffalo, managed by Kaleida Health, to be used as the "Robert B. Adam Education Center" as a home to several programs for children including a day care early childhood program.

In 2005, the house was sold for $875,000 (equivalent to $1,442,000 in 2025), and today, is operating as a school again. The current school, the "Oracle Charter School," was formed under the vision of "creating a small, caring, college prep high school" as an alternative to the large public high schools. The House underwent extensive renovation work, starting with a first phase in 2005, funded by a $300,000 stimulus grant through the "Charter Schools Institute," that included 13 classrooms, a cafeteria, renovations to the library and the gym/auditorium space. Additional phases focused on renovation of another five classrooms, plus science labs as well as reintroducing green space back to the site. Oracle Charter School closed in 2018 and the building was sold once again. It was being renovated into a boutique hotel, the developer dropped his original plan to convert the main house portion of the property into a boutique hotel, citing the impact of the Covid-19 pandemic on travel and the hospitality industry.

== Gallery ==
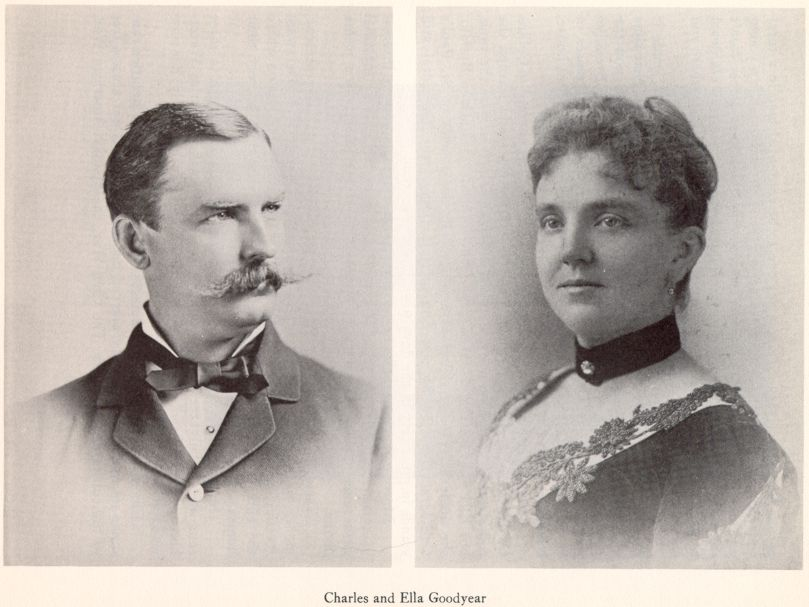
Charles and Ella Goodyear

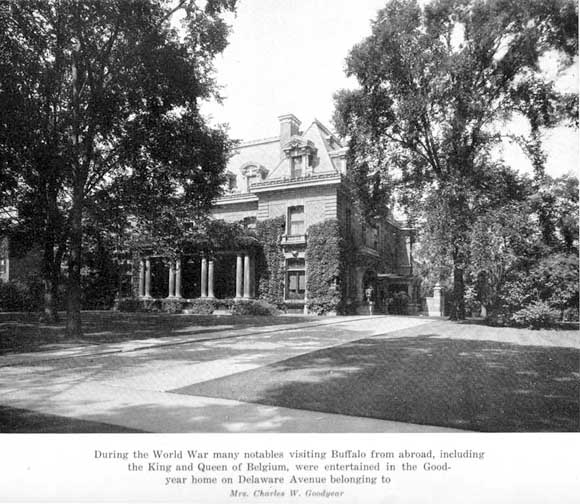
Front (East) Elevation

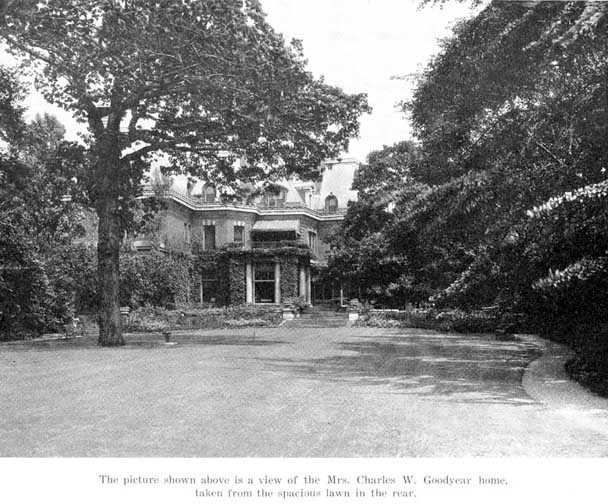
Rear (West) Elevation

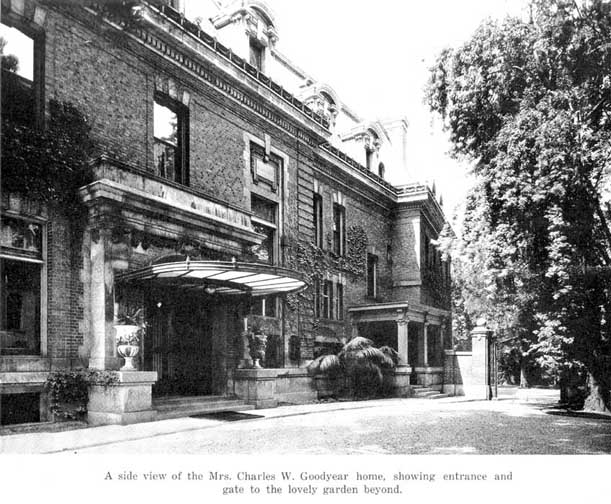
Main (North) Entrance

== See also ==
- Charles W. Goodyear
- Anson Goodyear
- Edward Brodhead Green
- Delaware Avenue Historic District (Buffalo, New York)
- Architecture of Buffalo, New York
