= Bradley Goodyear =

American lawyer and soldier

Major Bradley Goodyear
- Born: October 18, 1885; Buffalo, New York
- Died: February 6, 1959 (aged 73); Cooperstown, New York
- Education: Nichols School; The Hill School; Yale University; Harvard Law School
- Spouse: Jeanette Bissell (m. 1910)
- Children: 4
- Parent(s): Charles W. Goodyear; Ella Portia Conger
- Relatives: Anson Goodyear (brother)

Major Bradley Goodyear (October 18, 1885 – February 6, 1959) was an American lawyer, soldier, and member of the Goodyear family of New York.

== Early life ==
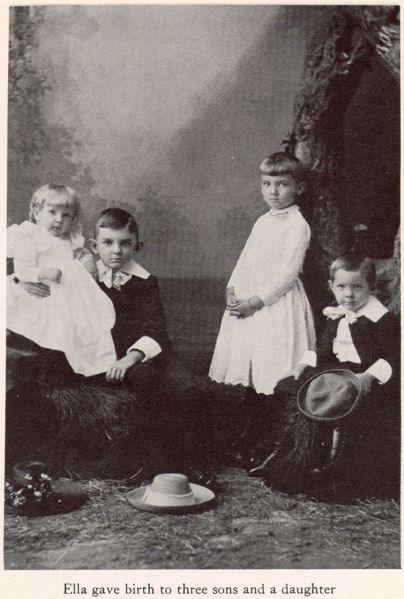
Bradley and his siblings

Goodyear was born on October 18, 1885, in Buffalo, New York. He was the youngest son of Charles W. Goodyear and Ella Portia (née Conger) Goodyear (1853–1940). His eldest brother Anson Goodyear was a prominent art collector. His sister, Esther Permelia Goodyear, married Arnold Brooks Watson. Another brother was Charles Waterhouse Goodyear II (who married Grace Rumsey, sister of Charles Cary Rumsey, and after their divorce, Marion Spaulding).

The family lived at 888 Delaware Avenue in Buffalo, which was built in 1903 for the Goodyears by architect E.B. Green of Green & Wicks. His father was a close friend of President Grover Cleveland. He attended the Nichols School and graduated from the Hill School in Pottstown, Pennsylvania. He received a bachelor's degree from Yale University in 1907 and graduated from Harvard Law School in 1910 where he served on the editorial board of the Harvard Law Review.

== Career ==
Goodyear began practicing law with Kenefick, Cook, Mitchell & Bass before becoming a partner in the firm of O'Brien, Hamlin & Goodyear with John Lord O'Brian and Chauncey J. Hamlin. Upon the outbreak of World War I, the firm was dissolved when the partners joined the war effort.

After World War I, he returned to Buffalo where he formed a law practice with Maj. Gen. William J. Donovan and Frank G. Raichie known as Donovan, Goodyear & Raichie. Reportedly, Goodyear retired from his law practice in c. 1923 when his partner Donovan, who was then also the U.S. Attorney for the Western District of New York, had his agents raid Buffalo's private Saturn Club (of which both men were members and which Goodyear was a Dean of) and confiscated large amounts of illegal liquor.

=== Military service ===
During the War, Goodyear went overseas with the 106th Field Artillery, with whom he had earlier served in the Mexican Border campaign. During the War, he fought in France during the Battle of Verdun and by the Wars end, had advanced to the rank of Major and was the commanding officer of his regiment.

== Personal life ==
In 1910, Goodyear was married to Jeanette Bissell (1886–1983), a daughter of Arthur D. Bissell and Frances "Fanny" (née Castle) Bissell. The Goodyears lived on Bryant Street and, later, on Delaware Avenue near Bryant. He was a member of the Buffalo Tennis and Squash Club, the Country Club of Buffalo, and the Cooperstown Country Club. Together, they were the parents of:

- Bradley Goodyear Jr. (1911–1942), who married Suzanne Robinson; he was killed in the U.S. Navy Air Corps during World War II.
- John Goodyear (1912–1964), a U.S. career diplomat in Turkey who married Julia Halls Owsley, a daughter of John Ebsworth Owsley, in 1937.
- Frances "Fanny" Goodyear (1914–1975), who married Prince Ludwig "Louis" Della Torre e Tasso, son of Prince Alessandro, 1st Duke of Castel Duino in 1939. They divorced in 1948 and she married Daniel Barton Streeter, son of Daniel Willard Streeter, in 1949.
- Thomas Goodyear (1917–1992), a founder of the Glimmerglass Opera.

Goodyear spent most of his last three decades at his country home in Springfield Center near Cooperstown, New York, known as Cary Mede, which they bought in 1920. Goodyear died at Bassett Hospital in Cooperstown on February 6, 1959. He was buried at Forest Lawn Cemetery, Buffalo. His widow died in 1983.
