= Anson Goodyear =

American businessman

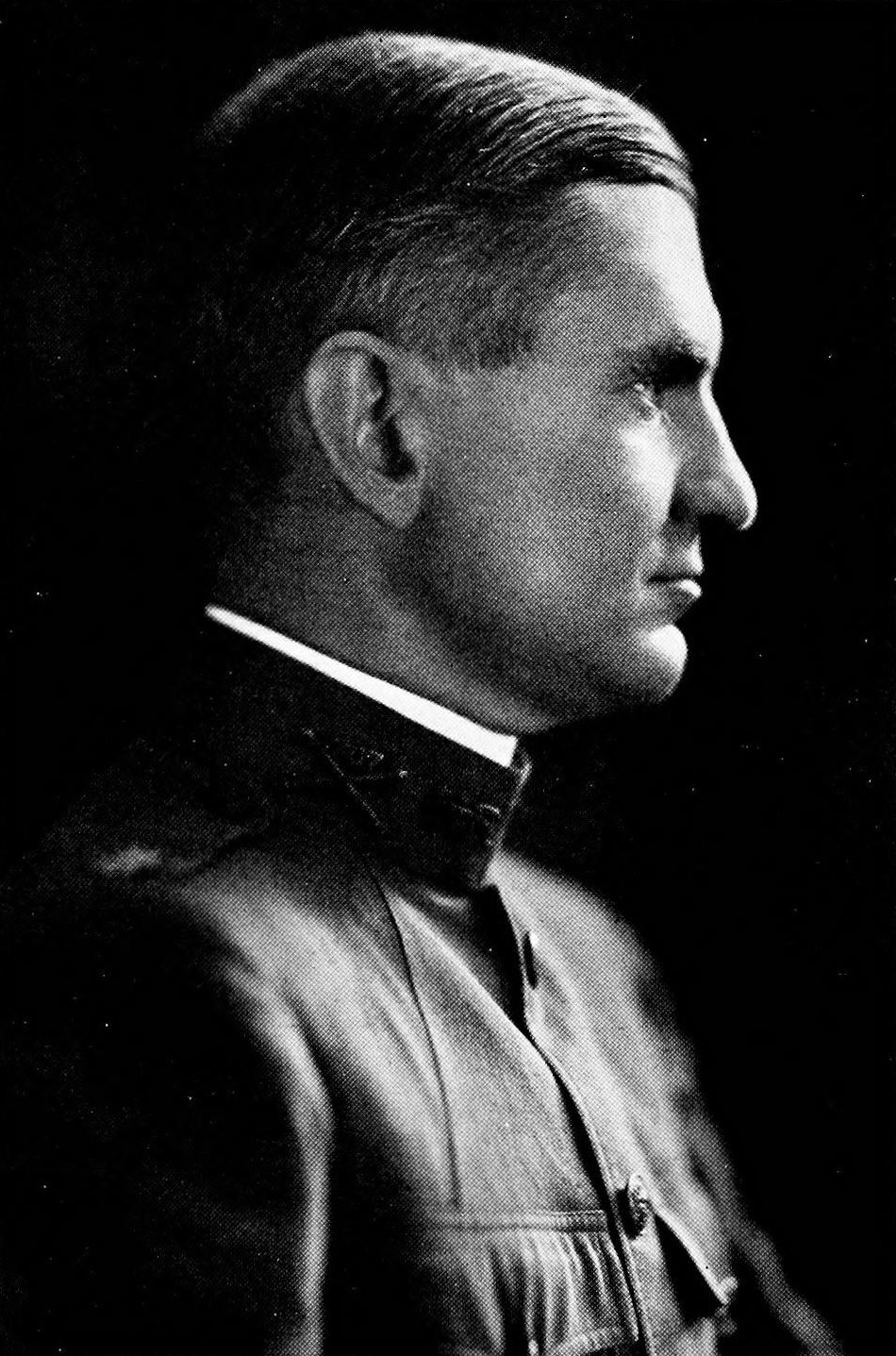
- Colonel Goodyear, executive officer of the Camp Taylor, Kentucky training school for artillery officers during World War I.

President of the Museum of Modern Art
- In office 1929–1939
- Preceded by: Inaugural holder
- Succeeded by: Nelson Rockefeller

Personal details
- Born: June 20, 1877 Buffalo, New York
- Died: April 24, 1964 (aged 86) Old Westbury, New York
- Spouses: Mary Martha Forman (m. 1904, divorced); Zaidee C. Bliss (m. 1950–1964)
- Children: 4
- Parent(s): Charles W. Goodyear; Ella Portia Conger
- Relatives: Frank H. Goodyear (uncle); George V. Forman (father-in-law)
- Education: Nichols School
- Alma mater: Yale University

Anson Conger Goodyear (June 20, 1877 – April 24, 1964) was an American manufacturer, businessman, author, and philanthropist and member of the Goodyear family. He is best known as one of the founding members and first president of the Museum of Modern Art in New York.

== Early life and education ==
Goodyear was born in Buffalo, New York, on June 20, 1877. Conger was the eldest of four children born to Charles Waterhouse Goodyear (1846–1911), a wealthy businessman who was friends with President Grover Cleveland, and Ella Portia Conger (1853–1940). His youngest brother was lawyer Bradley Goodyear. The family, who were very prominent in Western New York, resided at 888 Delaware Avenue in Buffalo.

He was educated at the Nichols School in Buffalo. He graduated from Yale University in 1899. While at Yale, Goodyear was a member of Alpha Delta Phi and the Wolf's Head Society; there he began collecting limited and first editions of books. He expanded the collection later, obtaining most of the letters of William Makepeace Thackeray to Jane Octavia Brookfield.

== Career ==
Goodyear was president of the Great Southern Lumber Company, based in Buffalo and operating a sawmill and related industry in Bogalusa, Louisiana (1920–38); and served as vice president of the Marine National Bank. His father and uncle Frank had built railroads to serve their lumber operations in isolated areas; this Goodyear served as the vice president of the Buffalo and Susquehanna Railroad (1907–10), which supported operations in New York and Pennsylvania, and was president of the New Orleans Great Northern Railroad Company (1920–30), built to support the Bogalusa pine lumber operation. He served as chairman of the board of directors of Gaylord Container Corporation, a successor to the Great Southern Lumber Company; director of Paramount Pictures, director of the Gulf, Mobile and Ohio Railroad, and as an executive or director of several other corporations.

=== Public service and military career ===
Active in the New York National Guard, Goodyear served as a colonel in World War I and was the executive officer of the Field Artillery Central Officers Training School at Camp Zachary Taylor, Kentucky.

In the 1930s, Goodyear became president and later chairman of the board of the American National Theater and Academy. After World War I, Herbert Hoover, as director general of relief of the Supreme Economic Council, appointed Goodyear president of the council's coal mission, putting him in charge of coal distribution in Austria, Hungary, and Poland. According to Kendrick Clements:

The gregarious, energetic, and ingenious Goodyear cheerfully accepted Hoover's orders to do anything necessary to get the coal moving. Employing his native charm and his authority to provide or withhold food shipments, he calmed strikes and opened borders. At one point, he got Hoover to send him $25,000 worth of tobacco to distribute among miners. Within a month, his unorthodox methods contributed to doubling coal production in Central Europe.

During World War II, Goodyear was commander of the Second Brigade of the New York Guard, with the rank of major general. Later in World War II, he was a deputy commissioner for the Pacific Ocean area, including Hawaii, of the American Red Cross. In this capacity, he toured the Pacific battlefronts, covering 50,000 miles. Later, as a military observer, he was at the front in Okinawa with New York's 27th Division and reported to the Secretary of War on conditions in the field and troop morale.

=== Art collector and Museum of Modern Art ===
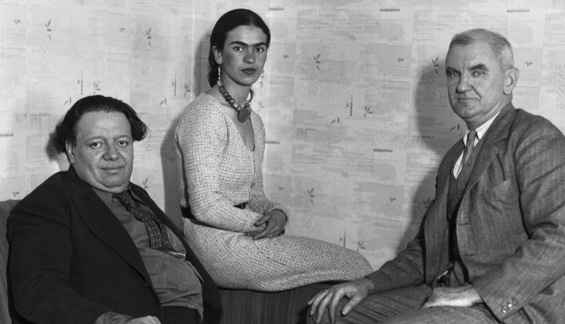
Artists Diego Rivera, Frida Kahlo, and Goodyear (on the right) in 1931

A noted philanthropist and avid collector of late 19th- and early 20th-century American and European art, Goodyear had a personal collection containing several important works by Paul Cézanne and Vincent van Gogh, and Paul Gauguin's Spirit of the Dead Watching. He also had works by Henri de Toulouse-Lautrec, Pierre-Auguste Renoir, Georges Seurat, Honoré Daumier, and Edgar Degas.

He was invited by Abby Aldrich Rockefeller, Mary Quinn Sullivan, and Lillie P. Bliss to help establish the Museum of Modern Art in New York City. He served as its first president (1929–39), and as a member of the board of trustees of MOMA, after moving to New York City.

Goodyear traveled to Europe at his own expense to collect paintings for the museum's first showing. While there, he visited England, France, the Netherlands, and Germany, and borrowed 25 paintings valued at $1.5 million (equivalent to $28,125,000 in 2025). In 1939, on the eve of the opening of the museum building on 53d Street, Nelson A. Rockefeller, later the Governor of New York, succeeded Goodyear as MOMA's chief executive.

Goodyear was also the author of several nonfiction works, including:

- A Memoir: John George Milburn, Jr. (1938), with Milburn Jr. Milburn Jr. became a lawyer and was son of prominent New York lawyer John G. Milburn; John Jr's older brother was Devereux Milburn, an internationally known polo player.
- American Art Today: Gallery of American Art Today, New York World's Fair (1939), with Grover A. Whalen
- The Museum of Modern Art. The First Ten Years (1943)

=== Philanthropy ===
Goodyear donated a collection of Civil War materials he had compiled to Yale University in 1953. The collection contained correspondence, diaries, proclamations, and other papers relating to the Civil War.

By the time of his death, Goodyear donated nearly 300 artworks to the Albright-Knox in Buffalo, New York. He also bequeathed many important works, including Giacomo Balla’s Dinamismo di un Cane al Guinzaglio (Dynamism of a Dog on a Leash), 1912; Salvador Dalí’s The Transparent Simulacrum of the Feigned Image, 1938; and Frida Kahlo’s Self-Portrait with Monkey, 1938. Shortly before his death, the museum established the A. Conger Goodyear Fund for the acquisition of new artwork, greatly enhancing its ability to grow its collection in the years to come.

He was a close friend of actress and theater producer Katharine Cornell, also from Buffalo. Upon her death in 1974, she bequeathed part of her foundation's assets to Museum of Modern Art (MoMA) in his honor. Goodyear was also a director of the Buffalo Academy of Fine Arts, an honorary governor of the New York Hospital, and a donor to Dartmouth College. He was also a member of the Saturn Club in Buffalo. A friend of Ernest N. Harmon, Conger also made donations to Norwich University, and Norwich's Goodyear Hall is named for him.

== Personal life ==
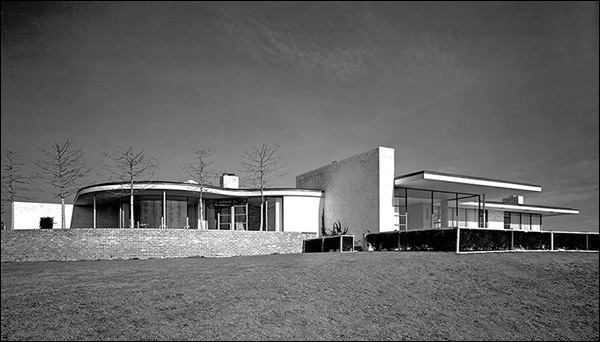
A. Conger Goodyear House in Old Westbury, NY

On June 29, 1904, Goodyear married Mary Martha Forman (1879–1973), the only daughter of George V. Forman, also of Buffalo. George Forman was prominent banker and the founder of VanderGrift, Forman & Company, which later became part of the Standard Oil Company, and the Fidelity Trust and Guaranty Company, which later became M&T Bank. Before they divorced, Goodyear and Forman had four children:

- George Forman Goodyear (1906–2002), who married Sarah Norton in 1932. After Sarah's death, he married Marion Gurney (née Spaulding), the mother of his son-in-law. George was one of the founders of WGRZ-TV in Buffalo.
- Mary Goodyear (1907–1977), who married Theodore G. Kenefick (1898–1972)
- Anson C. Goodyear Jr. (1911–1982)
- Stephen Goodyear (1915–1998), who first married Aline Fox in 1942. She died in 1943 and he then married Mary Van Rensselaer Robins, the granddaughter of Thomas Robins Jr., in 1944. Robins was the granddaughter of Mary Van Rensselaer Cogswell (1839–1871) and Andrew K. Cogswell (1839–1900). Goodyear and Robins divorced and in 1964, Robins married Julien D. McKee (1918–2006)

In 1950, he married Zaidee C. Bliss (née Cobb) (1881–1966), widow of Cornelius Newton Bliss Jr., a financier who was the son of Cornelius N. Bliss, the former Secretary of the Interior and director of the Metropolitan Opera Company.

His home in Old Westbury, New York, the A. Conger Goodyear House (built in 1938 by Edward Durell Stone), is on the National Register of Historic Places. Goodyear died in Old Westbury, New York on April 24, 1964. After his death, his art collection was bequeathed to the Buffalo Academy of Fine Arts.

=== Descendants ===
Through his eldest son, George Forman Goodyear, he was the grandfather of Mary "Molly" Forman Goodyear (b. 1935), who married Albert Ramsdell Gurney Jr. (1930–2017), a prominent playwright, Anne Goodyear, who married U.S. Representative William H. Hudnut III (1932–2016), and Sarah C. Goodyear.

== See also ==
- A. Conger Goodyear House
- Charles W. Goodyear
- Charles W. Goodyear House
- Museum of Modern Art
- Buffalo Academy of Fine Arts
- Great Southern Lumber Company
- Buffalo and Susquehanna Railroad
