= Frank H. Goodyear =

American businessman

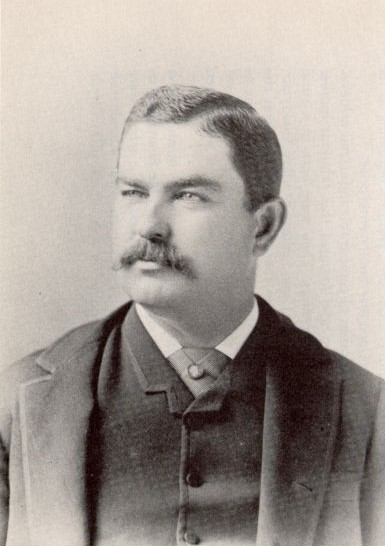
- Born: Frank Henry Goodyear; March 7, 1849; Groton, New York
- Died: May 13, 1907 (aged 58); Buffalo, New York
- Spouse: Josephine Looney (m. 1871)
- Children: 4
- Parent(s): Bradley Goodyear; Esther Permelia Kinne
- Relatives: Charles W. Goodyear (brother)

Frank Henry Goodyear (March 7, 1849 – May 13, 1907) was an American businessman, lumberman, and member of the prominent Goodyear family of New York. He was the founder and president of several companies, including the Buffalo and Susquehanna Railroad, Great Southern Lumber Company, Goodyear Lumber Co., Buffalo & Susquehanna Coal and Coke Co., and the New Orleans Great Northern Railroad Company.

== Early life, family and education ==
Goodyear was born on March 7, 1849, in Groton, New York, but soon after his birth, the family moved to Holland in Erie County. He was a son of Dr. Bradley Goodyear (1816–1889), and Esther Permelia (née Kinne) Goodyear (1822–1907). His elder brother was Charles W. Goodyear, who was the father of Anson Goodyear. His father had been a tailor until Bradley's uncle Dr. Miles Goodyear, president of the Cortland County Medical Society, persuaded him to study at Geneva Medical College.

Frank attended the district school and East Aurora Academy.

== Career ==
Goodyear taught at the district school he had attended as a student. After his stint as a teacher, he worked as a bookkeeper in Looneyville, New York, for Robert Looney, a native of the Isle of Man. Looney ran a farm, sawmill, general store, and feed and grain business, and he owned vast timberlands in Pennsylvania. Frank married Robert's daughter Josephine in 1871. When Robert died in 1872, they inherited the timberlands from her father's estate. Frank and Josephine had moved to Buffalo, New York, before Looney's death. Frank used the inheritance to start his lumber business and enterprises.

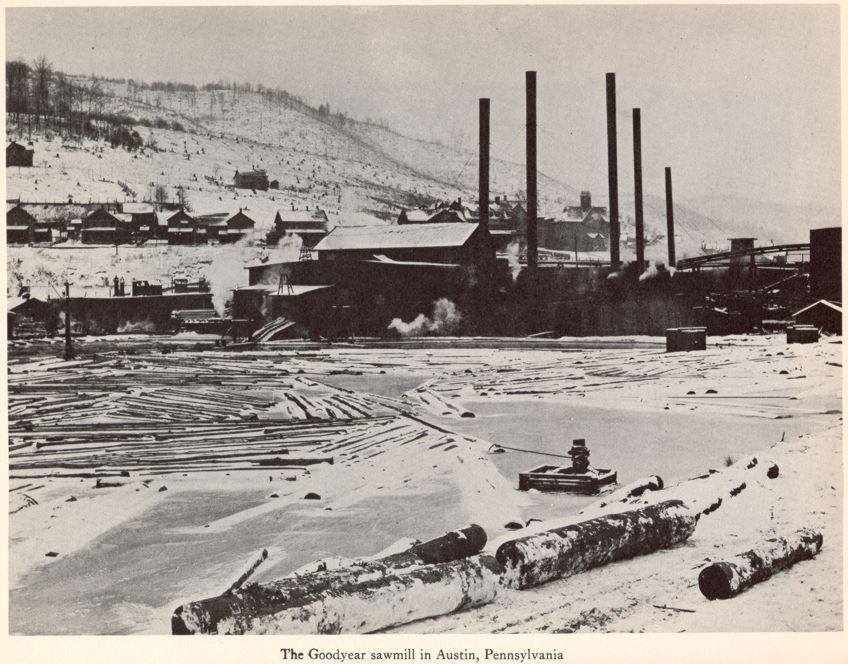
The Goodyear sawmill in Austin, Pennsylvania

In 1887, Goodyear and his brother Charles, who gave up his law practice, formed a lumber company named F. H. & C. W. Goodyear. They invested in timberlands, lumber mills, coal, and railroads in remote areas of Pennsylvania and New York. They bought up large tracts of timberland that were considered inaccessible for harvest, because the lands were isolated and away from the streams that were typically used to transport logs. To access the timber, they built railroad spurs for transport, and local sawmills to process the trees into lumber. In many areas, they built company towns for workers in the isolated sawmills. They achieved great financial success with these strategies.

The Goodyears were the world's largest manufacturers of hemlock lumber, with an annual output around 200,000,000 board feet (nearly 490,000 cubic meters) of hemlock, and nearly as much in hardwood. In 1893, Frank created the Buffalo and Susquehanna Railroad through the merger and consolidation of several smaller logging railroads. In the late 1890s, Frank stepped down as president of the railroad and assumed the positions of first vice-president and chairman of the board, and Marlin Olmsted became president.

Between 1901 and 1905, the Goodyears moved South, purchasing 300,000 acres of virgin yellow pine timberland in southeastern Louisiana and southwestern Mississippi, near the southern end of the Pearl River. In 1902, the Goodyears created the Great Southern Lumber Company in Pennsylvania with offices in the Ellicott Square Building in Buffalo.

The Goodyears also created the Great Southern Lumber Company sawmill in southeast Louisiana, which became the largest sawmill in the world. They developed the company town of Bogalusa, where workers and their supervisors and families would live. It was designed and built from the ground up, to include hotels, staff housing, churches, schools, and a YMCA and YWCA. To bring harvested trees to the sawmill and transport processed lumber to markets, they also created the New Orleans Great Northern Railroad, which connected Bogalusa to New Orleans and the national railroad network.

In 1906, they extended the Buffalo and Susquehanna Railroad nearly 90 mi (140 km) from Wellsville to Buffalo. Frank died in 1907, shortly before the Panic of 1907 and before the Bogalusa sawmill was completed. Following his death, Frank's brother Charles took over his presidencies and the sawmill began operation in 1908, which generated significant profit for the family.

== Personal life ==
In 1871, Goodyear married Josephine Looney (1852–1915), a daughter of Josephine (née Kidder) Looney and Robert Looney. Together, they were the parents of four children:

- Grace Esther Goodyear (1872–1914), who married Ganson Depew, nephew of U.S. Senator Chauncey M. Depew, in 1894. They divorced in 1909 and she married "Wyoming cattle king" Ashton Howard Potter, the youngest son of Howard Potter and nephew of Bishop Horatio Potter, in 1910. They built the El Pomar Estate in Colorado Springs, Colorado.
- Josephine Goodyear (1874–1904), who married George Montgomery Sicard, a son of Stephen Sicard, in 1900. His uncle, George J. Sicard, was a law partner of Grover Cleveland in the firm, Cleveland, Bissell & Sicard.
- Florence Goodyear (1884–1958), who married George Olds Wagner in 1902. They divorced and she married eight-time Olympic medalist Charles Meldrum Daniels in 1909.
- Frank Henry Goodyear Jr. (1891–1930), who married Dorothy Virginia Knox, a daughter of Seymour H. Knox I, in 1915. After his death, she married widower Edmund Pendleton Rogers in 1931.

Goodyear died of Bright's disease at his home in Buffalo on May 13, 1907. He was buried at Forest Lawn Cemetery, Buffalo. His widow Josephine died of a heart attack in October 1915. She was remembered as the benefactress of the convalescent home for children named after her in Williamsville, New York.

=== Residences ===
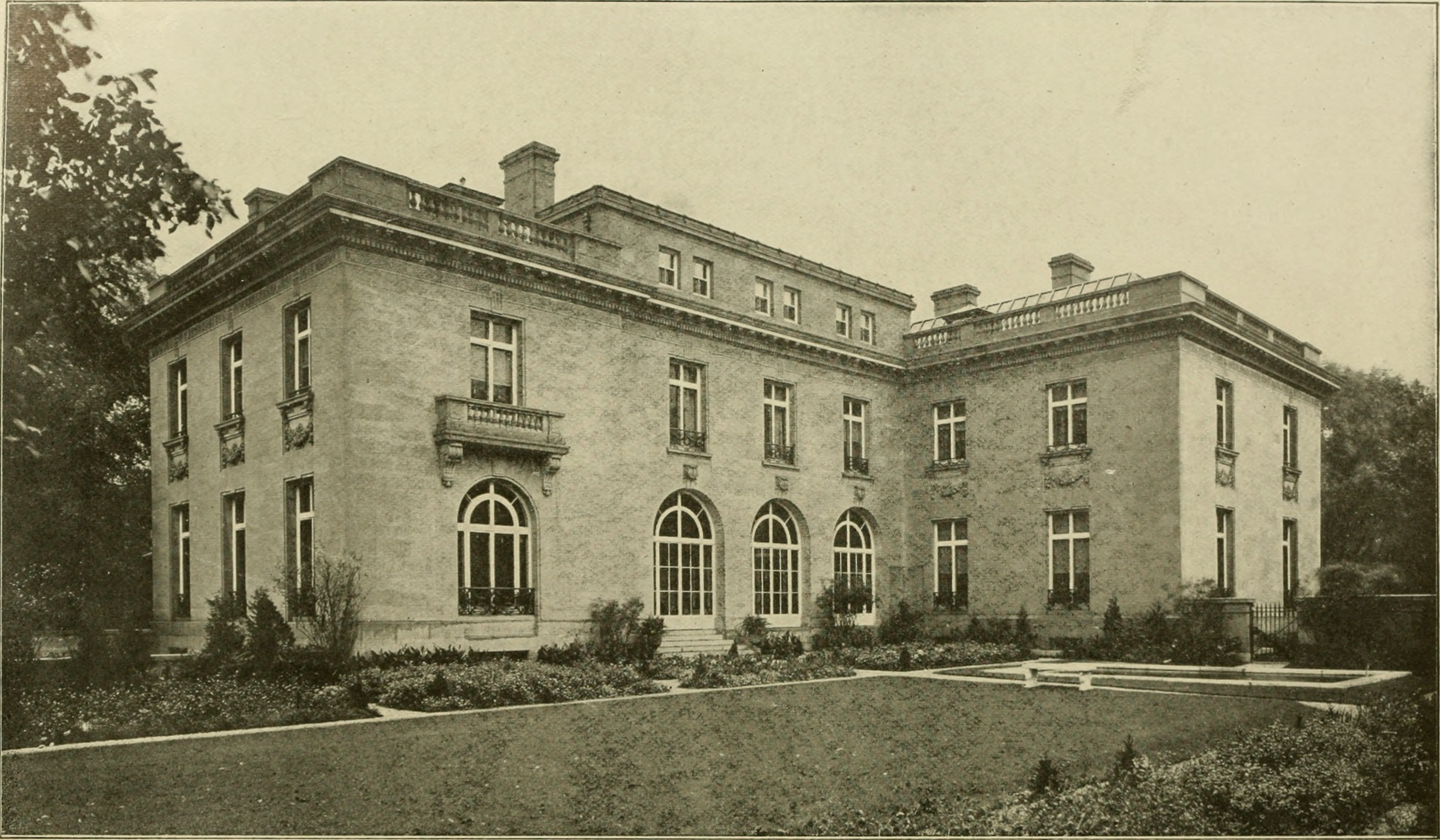
Goodyear's final home in Buffalo, New York, designed by Carrère and Hastings

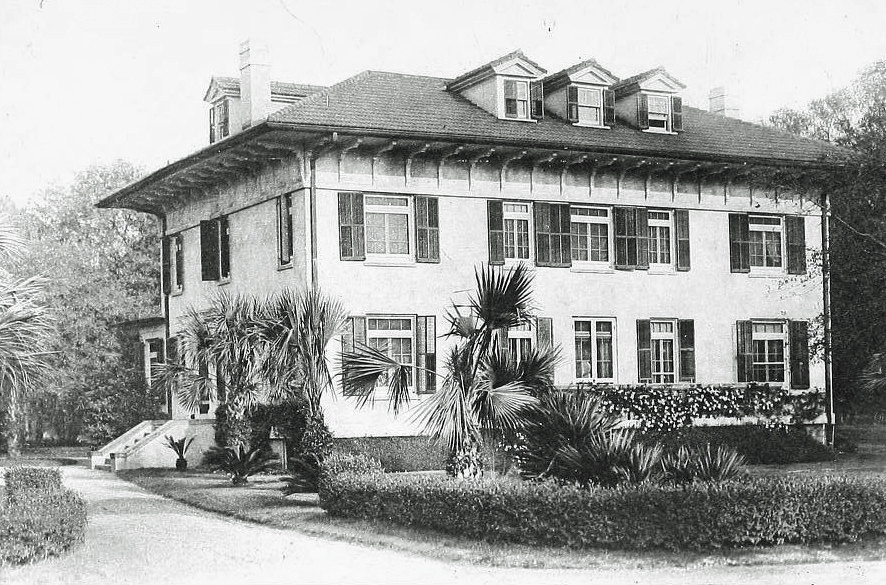
The Goodyear Cottage on Jekyll Island, also designed by Carrère and Hastings

Upon relocating to Buffalo, the resided at 443 Delaware Avenue. After living at 652 and 671 Main Street, they moved to a large Queen Anne style house at 267 North Street, which had been designed by Joseph Lyman Silsbee for John M. Bemis. After it was sold, they lived at 237 North Street which was the residence of John D. Larkin (before he moved to "Larkland" in 1912).

In 1903, Goodyear purchased 762 Delaware Avenue, a Gothic revival house which had been designed by John D. Towle for Myron P. Bush in 1859. Goodyear tore down the Bush house and hired Carrère and Hastings to design his new residence, modeled on a house on the Champs-Élysées in Paris. The firm, today best known for designing the New York Public Library Main Branch and the Henry Clay Frick House in New York, had been responsible for the architectural planning of the 1901 Pan-American Exposition in Buffalo. The Goodyear house reportedly cost $500,000 and was completed in 1906, shortly before Goodyears death.

The Goodyears also hired Carrère and Hastings in 1903 to design their home on Jekyll Island. The sixteen-room cottage was designed in the Mediterranean Revival style and was completed in 1906 and stayed in the family until the 1940s. The cottage was restored in 1973 and, today, the cottage is used as a Gift Shop, Art Gallery, and Museum featuring various items produced by Jekyll Island Arts Association.

=== Descendants ===
Through his daughter Grace, he was a grandfather of Ganson Goodyear Depew, the Assistant United States District Attorney for Western New York.
