= Charles W. Goodyear =

American businessman

19th District Attorney of Erie County, New York
- In office October 15, 1877 – December 31, 1877
- Preceded by: Daniel N. Lockwood
- Succeeded by: Robert C. Titus

Assistant District Attorney of Erie County, New York
- In office January 1, 1875 – October 15, 1877
- Preceded by: Norris Morey
- Succeeded by: Samuel M. Welch

Personal details
- Born: Charles Waterhouse Goodyear; October 15, 1846 Cortland, New York, US
- Died: April 16, 1911 (aged 64) Buffalo, New York, US
- Resting place: Forest Lawn Cemetery, Buffalo
- Spouse: Ella Portia Conger
- Children: 4, including Anson
- Relatives: See Goodyear family
- Occupation: President of the Great Southern Lumber Company and Buffalo and Susquehanna Railroad
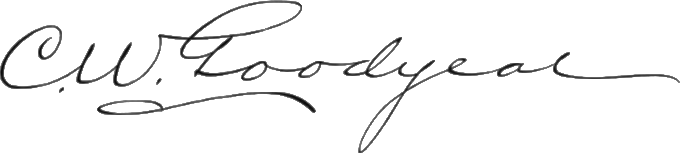
- Signature

Charles Waterhouse Goodyear (October 15, 1846 – April 16, 1911) was an American lawyer, businessman, lumberman, and member of the prominent Goodyear family of New York. Based in Buffalo, New York, along with his brother, Frank, Charles was the founder and president of several companies, including the Buffalo and Susquehanna Railroad, Great Southern Lumber Company, Goodyear Lumber Company, Buffalo & Susquehanna Coal & Coke Company, and the New Orleans Great Northern Railroad Company.

In the late 19th century, his brother and he were highly successful in harvesting timber from formerly isolated areas of Pennsylvania and New York. They built railroad spurs to provide access to the properties and local sawmills, using the railroads to transport lumber to market. In the early 20th century, they used this same strategy in the South. They bought several hundred thousand acres of virgin pine forest in Louisiana and Mississippi, built the largest sawmill in the world, and developed the company town of Bogalusa, Louisiana, for the workers to support their operation. They also built a railroad to serve the operation and connect it to markets. Goodyear was also a director of Marine National Bank, and of General Railway Signal.

== Early life ==
Charles W. Goodyear was born in Cortland, New York, on October 15, 1846, to Dr. Bradley Goodyear (1816–1889), who had graduated from Geneva Medical College in 1845, and Esther P. (née Kinne) Goodyear (1822–1907). Her ancestors came to the United States via Leyden, Holland, in 1635. A younger brother, Frank Henry, was born in 1849.

Goodyear was educated at Cortland Academy, Wyoming Academy, and in East Aurora, New York, when his father was practicing medicine there. As boys, both Charles and Frank worked at Root & Keating's tannery.

== Career ==
In 1868, Goodyear moved to Buffalo to study law in the offices of Laning & Miller, and later with John C. Strong. Goodyear was admitted to the New York State Bar Association in 1871 and began his own practice in Buffalo. His practice continued until 1875, when he formed a partnership with Major John Tyler, which continued for two years. From 1877 until 1882, Goodyear practiced alone until forming a partnership with Henry F. Allen (1837–1910) under the name Goodyear & Allen.

In 1883, when Grover Cleveland became Governor of New York and stepped down from Cleveland, Bissell, and Sicard, Goodyear joined as a name partner. The firm was renamed Bissell, Sicard & Goodyear. The practice with Bissell, Sicard & Goodyear lasted for the next four years.

=== Political career ===
From January 1, 1875, until October 15, 1877, Goodyear served as assistant district attorney under District Attorney of Erie County Daniel N. Lockwood. Elected to the United States Congress in 1876, Lockwood resigned the office of district attorney in the autumn of 1877, and Governor Lucius Robinson appointed Goodyear as DA to fill the unexpired term until January 1, 1878.

=== Business career ===
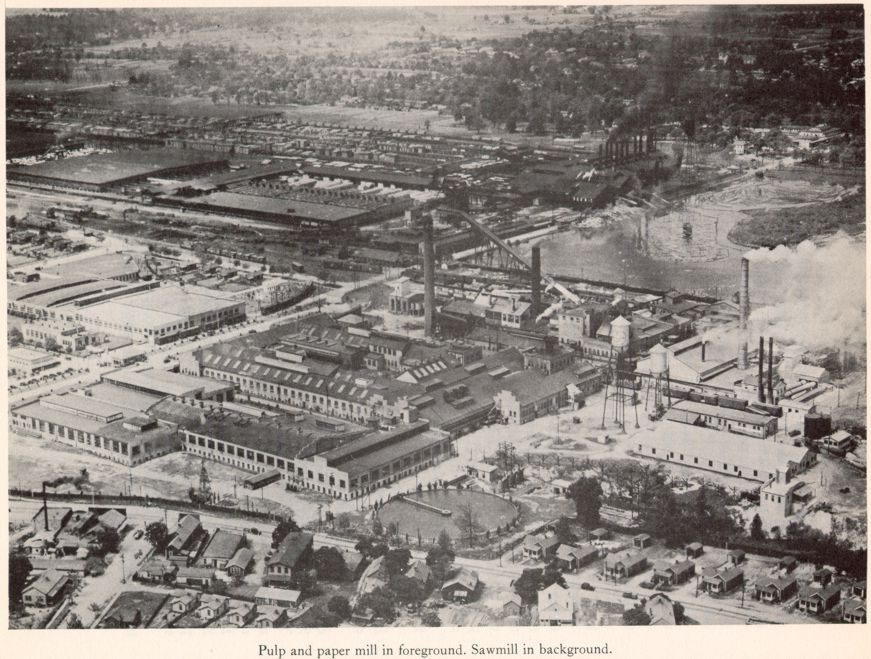
Pulp and paper mill in foreground at Bogalusa, Louisiana, sawmill in background

Goodyear gave up the practice of law in 1887 to form a lumber company with his brother, Frank H. Goodyear, under the firm name F. H. & C. W. Goodyear. They invested in timberlands, lumber mills, coal, and railroads in remote areas of Pennsylvania and New York. They bought up large tracts of timberland that were considered inaccessible for harvest, because the lands were isolated and away from the streams that were typically used to transport logs. To access the timber, they built railroad spurs for transport, and local sawmills to process the trees into lumber. In many areas, they built company towns for workers in the isolated sawmills. They achieved great financial success with these strategies.

The Goodyears were the world's largest manufacturers of hemlock lumber, with an annual output around 200,000,000 board feet of hemlock, and nearly as much in hardwood. In the late 1890s as the lumber business expanded, Goodyear joined his brother's Buffalo and Susquehanna Railroad, which Frank had created in 1893 by the merger and consolidation of several smaller logging railroads. When Goodyear joined, Frank stepped down as president of the railroad and assumed the positions of first vice president and chairman of the board. Charles Goodyear became second vice president and general manager of the railroad, while Marlin Olmsted became president.

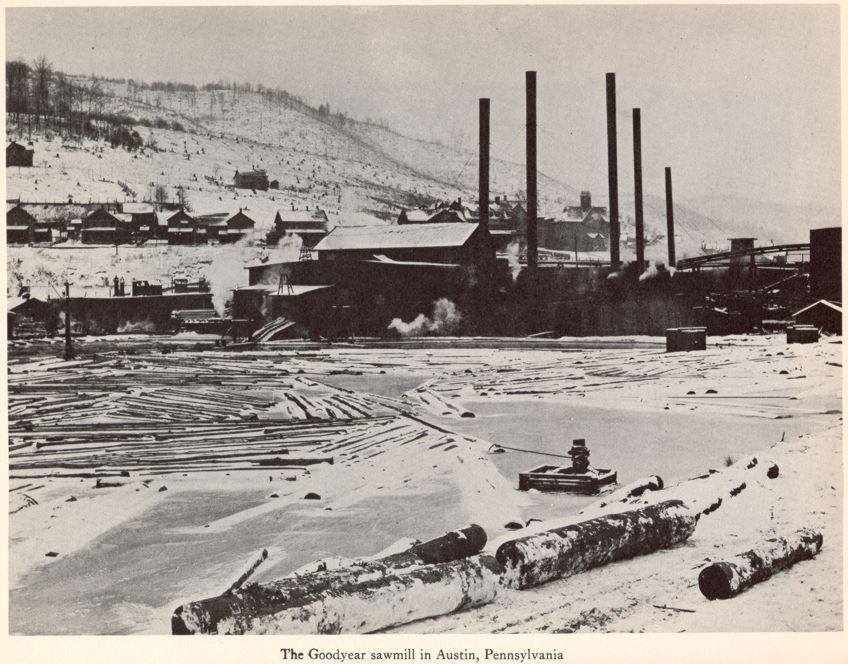
The Goodyear sawmill in Austin, Pennsylvania

Between 1901 and 1905, the brothers moved South, purchasing 300,000 acres of virgin yellow pine timberland in southeastern Louisiana and southwestern Mississippi, near the southern end of the Pearl River. In 1902, the brothers chartered the Great Southern Lumber Company in Pennsylvania, establishing their offices in the Ellicott Square Building in downtown Buffalo.

The brothers began construction of the Great Southern Lumber Company sawmill, which was the largest sawmill in the world, in southeast Louisiana, and developed the company town of Bogalusa, where workers and their supervisors and families would live. It was designed and built from the ground up, to include hotels, classes of housing, churches, schools, YMCA and YWCA, and similar services. To bring harvested trees to the sawmill and transport processed lumber to markets, the Goodyears established the New Orleans Great Northern Railroad, which connected Bogalusa to the national railroad network and to New Orleans.

In 1906, the brothers extended the Buffalo and Susquehanna Railroad from Wellsville to Buffalo, nearly 90 miles. Frank Goodyear did not live to see the Bogalusa sawmill completed, dying in 1907 of Bright's disease, shortly before the Panic of 1907. The Great Southern Lumber Company sawmill began operation in 1908. Goodyear took over for Frank at the Buffalo and Susquehanna Railroad, among other companies they owned. He appointed William H. Sullivan as the general manager of the Great Southern Lumber Company and town boss of Bogalusa. After the city was incorporated, Sullivan served as mayor until his death in 1929.

At various points in his career, Goodyear was president of: Goodyear Lumber Co., Buffalo & Susquehanna Coal and Coke Co., Buffalo and Susquehanna Railroad, Great Southern Lumber Company, and the New Orleans Great Northern Railroad Company; and director of the Marine National Bank, and General Railway Signal.

== Personal life ==
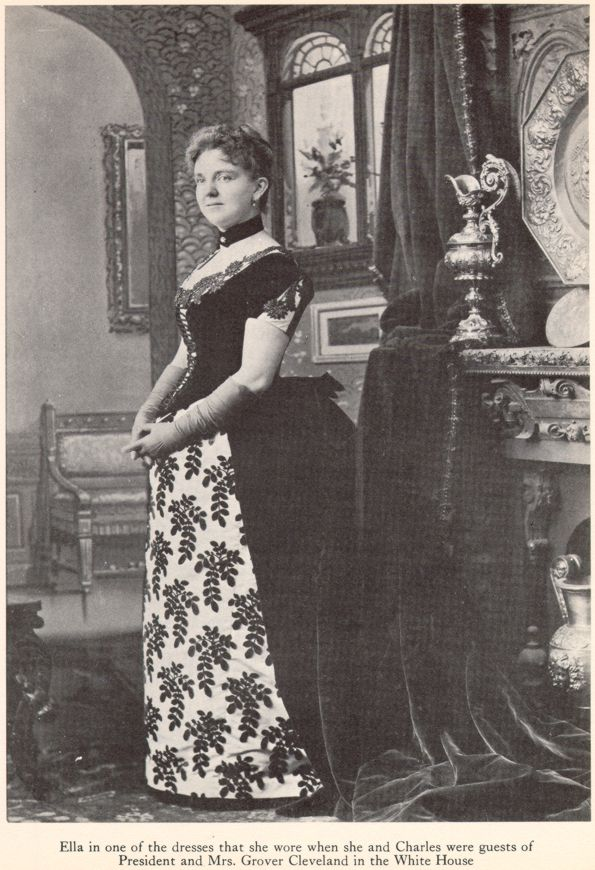
Ella in one of the dresses that she wore when Charles and she were guests of President and Mrs. Grover Cleveland in the White House

On March 23, 1876, Goodyear married Ella Portia Conger (1853–1940), of Collins Center, New York. The family lived at the Charles W. Goodyear House, built in 1903 by architect E.B. Green of Green & Wicks, at 888 Delaware Avenue in Buffalo. Together, they had four children, all born in Buffalo:

- Anson Conger Goodyear (1877–1964), who married Mary Forman (1879–1973).
- Esther Permelia Goodyear (1881–1955), who married Arnold Brooks Watson (b. 1877) in 1910.
- Charles Waterhouse Goodyear II (1883–1967), who married Grace Rumsey (1883–1963), sister of Charles Cary Rumsey, in 1908. They divorced, and in 1935, Charles married Marion Spaulding.
- Bradley Goodyear Sr. (1885–1959), who married Jeanette Bissell (1886–1983), a daughter of Arthur D. Bissell.

Goodyear, a member of the Presbyterian Church, held office of trustee of the Buffalo Normal School, was organizing director of the Pan-American Exposition, president of the Buffalo Club (in 1899), trustee to the Buffalo Historical Society, on the board of The Buffalo Fine Arts Academy and a delegate to Syracuse Convention.

Among his close friends were U.S. President Grover Cleveland and Cleveland's Secretary of War Daniel S. Lamont. He was widely considered instrumental in Cleveland receiving the nomination for President of the United States while Governor of New York. Goodyear and his wife were the first guests of President Cleveland at the White House.

Goodyear died in Buffalo, New York, on April 16, 1911 and is buried at Forest Lawn Cemetery, Buffalo along with his father, mother, brother, wife, and son.

== Gallery ==
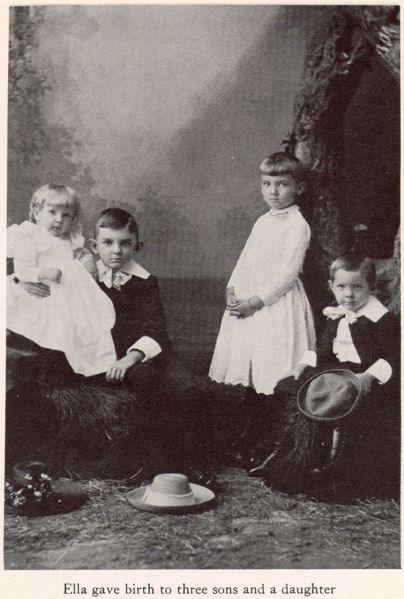
The Goodyear children

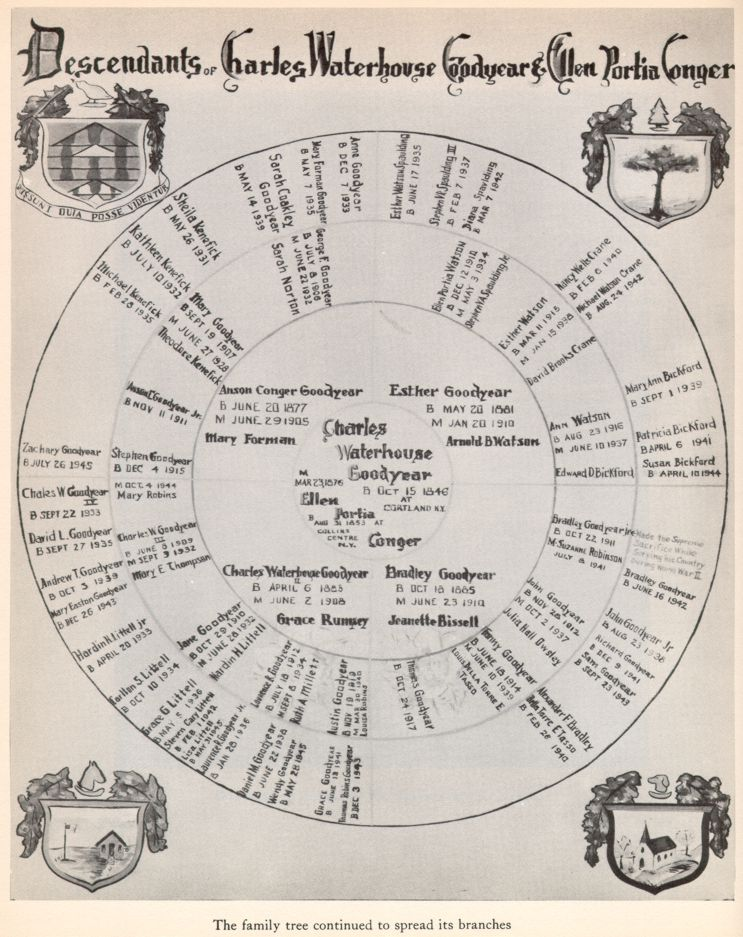
The family tree continued to spread its branches.

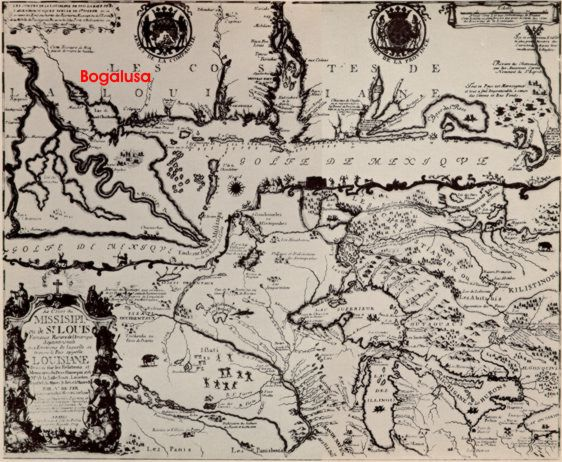
Old French map: Directly below the left-hand coat of arms is the site near Pearl River of what was to become Bogalusa

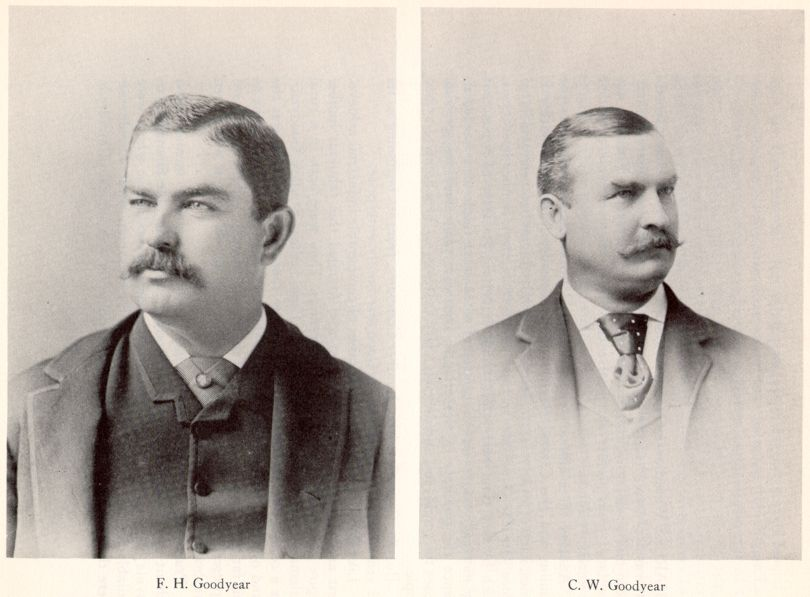
Charles W. Goodyear and Frank H Goodyear
