= Great Southern Lumber Company =

American lumber company in Louisiana, 1902–1938

- Founded: 1902 in Pennsylvania
- Founder: Frank H. Goodyear; Charles W. Goodyear
- Defunct: 1938
- Successor: Gaylord Container Corporation
- Headquarters: Bogalusa, Louisiana, United States
- Key people: Anson Goodyear; William H. Sullivan
- Products: Longleaf pine
- Subsidiaries: New Orleans Great Northern Railroad; Bogalusa Paper Company; Bogalusa Turpentine Company; Bogalusa Tung Oil

The Great Southern Lumber Company was chartered in 1902 to harvest and market the virgin longleaf pine (Pinus palustris L.) forests in southeastern Louisiana and southwestern Mississippi. Bogalusa, Louisiana was developed from the ground up as a company town and was the location for Great Southern Lumber Company's sawmill, which began operation in 1908. Other company interests included a railroad and paper mill. The company ceased operation in 1938, when the supply of virgin pines was depleted. Bogalusa became the site of a paper mill and chemical operations, followed by other industry.

== History ==
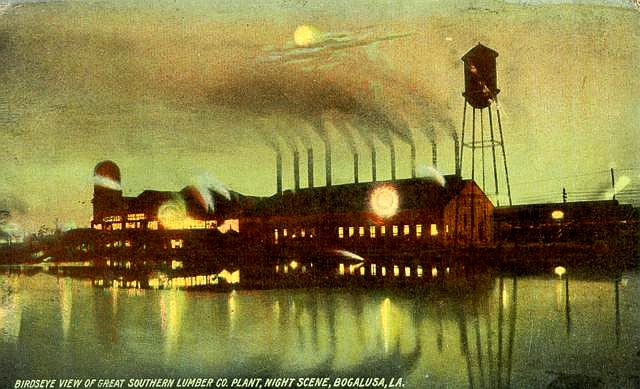
Great Southern Lumber Company sawmill circa 1920

During the latter half of the 19th century, brothers Frank H. and Charles W. Goodyear amassed great wealth by investing in timberlands, lumber mills, coal, and railroads in Pennsylvania and New York. The secret to their lumber company success was in buying up large tracts of timberland that were considered inaccessible for harvest, because the lands were isolated, away from streams that were normally used to transport cut logs to sawmills. To access the timber, the Goodyears built railroad spurs as well as local sawmills to process the trees into lumber.

Between 1901 and 1905, the brothers invested $9 million to purchase 300,000 acres (120,000 ha) of virgin yellow pine timberland in Louisiana and Mississippi near the southern end of the Pearl River. On January 17, 1902, the Goodyear brothers chartered the Great Southern Lumber Company in Pennsylvania.

The brothers initiated construction of the Great Southern Lumber Company sawmill in southeast Louisiana, and developed the company town of Bogalusa, where workers would live. To bring harvested trees to the sawmill and transport processed lumber to markets, the Goodyears established the New Orleans Great Northern Railroad, which connected Bogalusa to the national railroad network.

The Goodyear brothers did not live to see their southern timber venture completed. Frank Goodyear died in 1907, shortly before the Panic of 1907, and Charles Goodyear died in 1911. Amid uncertain economic times, the Great Southern Lumber Company sawmill began operation in 1908. Younger generations of Goodyears took over positions in the company that had been held by their elders.

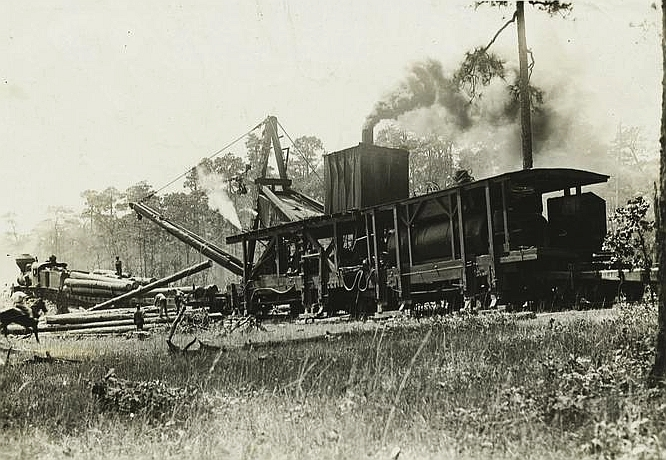
Great Southern Lumber Company Steam Skidder

=== Sawmill ===
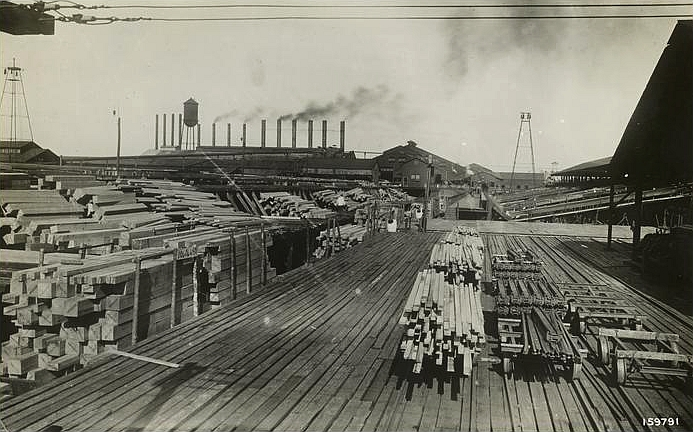
Lumber drying yard of Great Southern Lumber Company

The Great Southern Lumber Company sawmill was designed to process 1,000,000 board feet (2,400 m^{3}) of lumber per day and was the largest sawmill in the world, spread over 160 acres (65 ha). Once pines were felled, logs were dragged to railroad spurs by rail-mounted steam skidders with 1000-ft (300-m) draglines, loaded onto flatcars, and transported to the sawmill. At the mill, logs were unloaded into a 27-acre (11-ha) holding pond, then were moved along one of three conveyors into the sawmill.

The lumber company complex included 50 miles (80 km) of train track, lumber drying yards, and a planing mill. Before being transported to the drying yards, lumber passed through a dipping station that contained an alkali solution to prevent fungal staining. Carrying capacity of the drying yards was about 45,000,000 board feet (110,000 m^{3}). Waste material was either converted into boxes, staves, shingles, and lathes or transported to a boiler room for generating steam and electric power to run the mill.

The mill complex had 24 steam-heated kilns, where lumber dried for 72 hours. Each kiln could dry more than 50,000 board feet (120 m^{3}) of lumber. From the kilns, dried lumber was transported to stock sheds for storage.

By 1920, the sawmill complex employed more than 1,700 men plus another 1,000 men in logging camps to keep a continuous supply of logs coming to the mill.

=== Paper mill ===
Ten years after the sawmill began operating, the board of directors of Great Southern Lumber Company authorized construction of a paper mill that used the sulfate chemical process for converting wood into pulp. The Bogalusa Paper Company operated from 1918 to 1937 as a subsidiary of Great Southern to make better use of waste material that could not be sawn into lumber.

=== Labor unrest ===
William H. Sullivan had been appointed by the Goodyear brothers to serve as general manager of the Great Southern Lumber Company. Sullivan was also mayor of Bogalusa. In 1919, a work dispute with the company motivated black workers to unionize, which was supported by the existing white union. Armed company men were sent by Sullivan to quell the unrest. Shooting broke out between company supporters and union supporters, resulting in the death of four white union men and the wounding of one company man. Social order was restored when the Louisiana Governor requested the deployment of federal troops in Bogalusa. Five officers and 100 troops arrived to secure Bogalusa for one month, under the leadership of Major General Henry G. Sharpe.

=== Other business ventures ===
In addition to lumber, paper, and railroads, the Great Southern Lumber Company expanded into other enterprises that included the Bogalusa Turpentine Company, Bogalusa Tung Oil, and the Bogalusa Stores (commissary). Bogue Chitto Farm was established by Great Southern Lumber Company to demonstrate how cutover timberland could be developed as truck farms.

=== Reforestation ===
Early in the 20th century, many timber companies had the philosophy of cut out and get out—a logging technique that removed all merchantable trees and left a barren landscape. In contrast, the Great Southern Lumber Company was one of the pioneers in reforestation in the South and established a tree nursery that grew pine seedlings for restocking their cutover lands.

Great Southern foresters began planting the company's cutover land with slash pine (Pinus elliottii) seedlings, because they grew faster than the virgin longleaf pines. However, that effort did not begin soon enough to establish second-growth pines as a source of lumber to feed the giant mill before the virgin timber was exhausted. Yet, within 20 years, the planted pines did provide a source of pulpwood for the paper mill. The paper mill also benefited from favorable tax legislation on reforestation, construction of hard-surface highways, and low-cost truck transportation.

== Closure ==
In 1937, Great Southern Lumber Company sold its Bogalusa Paper Mill, and Gaylord Container Corporation became its successor. After 30 years of operation, the Great Southern Lumber Company closed in 1938, when the vast supply of virgin pines was finally depleted. The company was dissolved by its board of directors, and all sawmill equipment was dismantled and sold.

== See also ==
- L.N. Dantzler Lumber Company
- Fernwood Lumber Company
- Finkbine-Guild Lumber Company
