= Buffalo and Susquehanna Railroad =

American railroad company

Map

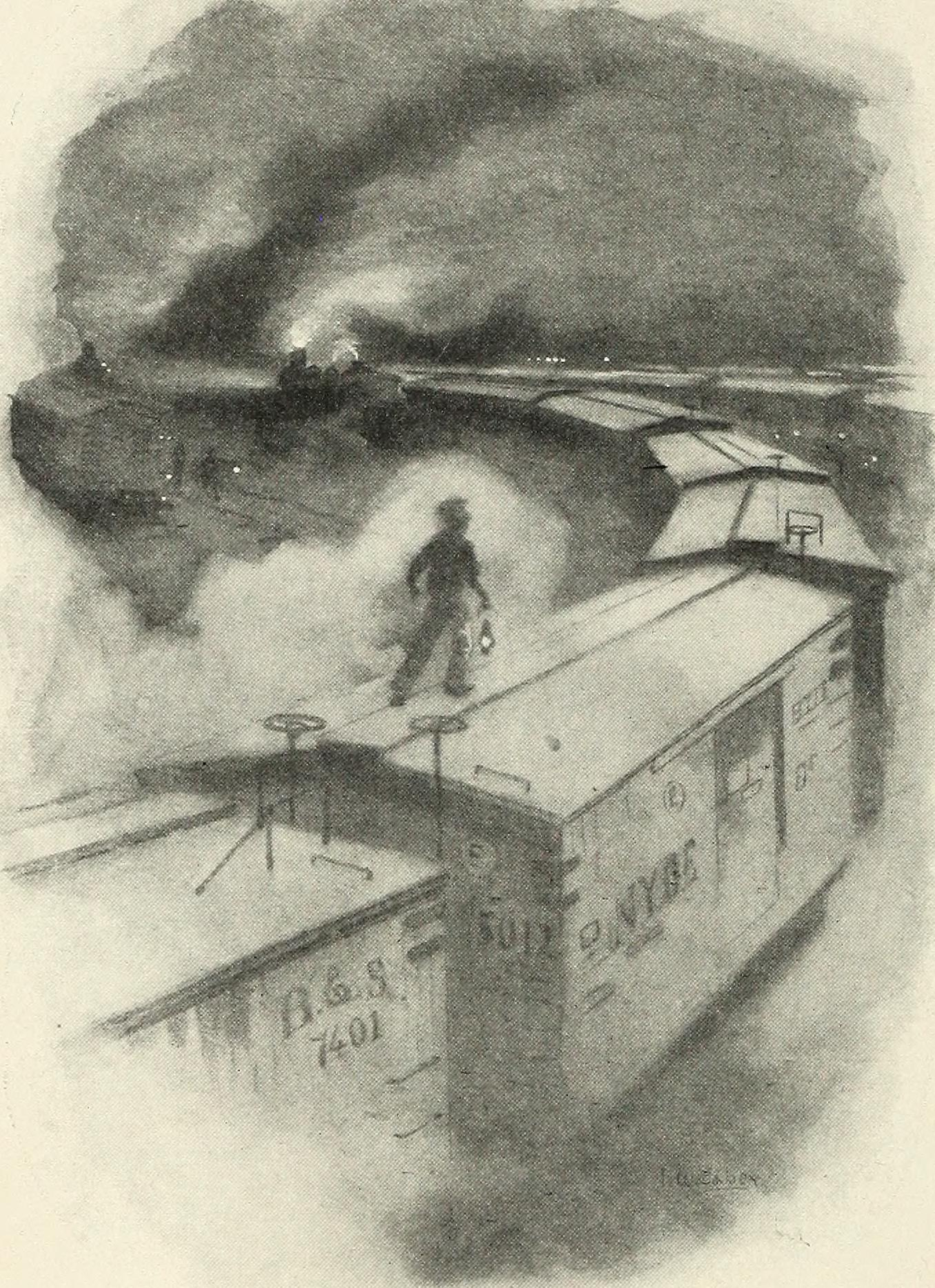
B&S No 7401 goods waggon

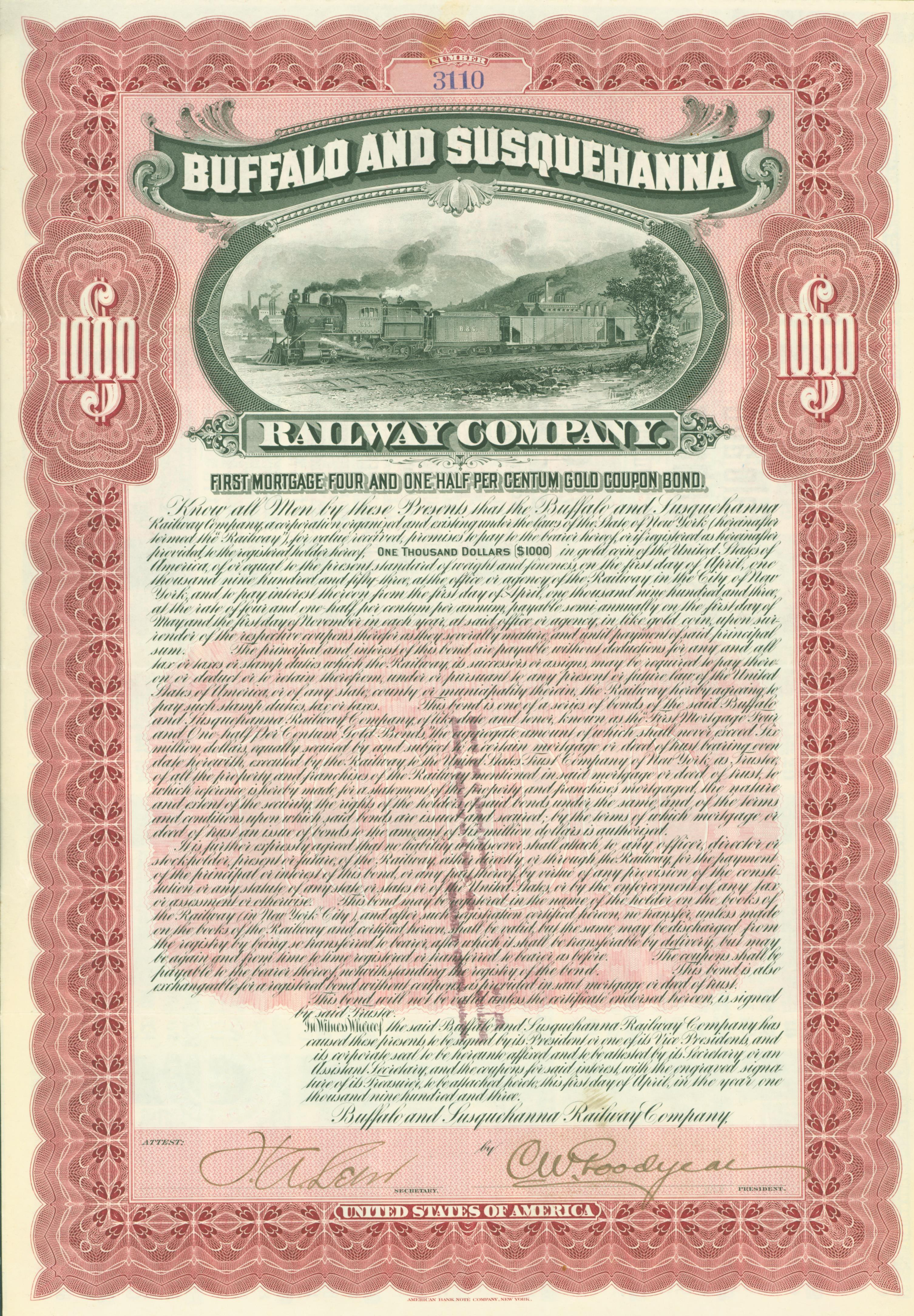
Bond of the Buffalo and Susquehanna Railway Company, issued 1 April 1903

The Buffalo and Susquehanna Railroad was a railroad company that formerly operated in western and north central Pennsylvania and western New York. It was created in 1893 by the merger and consolidation of several smaller logging railroads. It operated independently until 1929, when a majority of its capital stock was purchased by the Baltimore and Ohio Railroad. At the same time, the B&O also purchased control of the neighboring Buffalo, Rochester, and Pittsburgh Railway. The Baltimore and Ohio officially took over operations of both roads in 1932.

In 1954, the Buffalo and Susquehanna Railroad and its remaining subsidiaries were formally merged into the Baltimore and Ohio system. Then in 1956, the Baltimore and Ohio sold the remaining 97 miles (156 km) of former Buffalo and Susquehanna track to the H. E. Salzberg Company, who organized the Wellsville, Addison and Galeton Railroad to operate the line. The line was finally abandoned in 1979.

The Buffalo and Susquehanna Railroad was created and constructed by Frank H. Goodyear, a Buffalo fuel dealer, to move his lumber and coal from north central Pennsylvania to his businesses and companies in Buffalo. The line was started in Keating Summit, and extended into Galeton, where it branched off to Wellsville, Addison, and Ansonia. The Wellsville branch was briefly extended to Buffalo. Near Keating Summit, the line was extended south from Wharton through Du Bois terminating 75 miles (121 km) south at Sagamore. At its peak, the railroad ran 250 miles (400 km) from Buffalo to Sagamore and had more than 400 miles (640 km) of track.

== Initial acquisitions ==
In 1885 Frank H. Goodyear, a Buffalo lumber and fuel dealer, bought thousands of acres of virgin Hemlock timberland in north-central Pennsylvania. Up until the 1880s, the lumber industries mostly avoided Hemlock, due to its ring shaking and high knot content, instead choosing to go after the more solid Pine and Spruce forests. But with most of the other local competing softwoods forests already denuded, there was now a growing local demand for the cheaper Hemlock. At the same time, the lack of good waterways to float the lumber to the mills made this location less than ideal for standard operations by experienced lumber operators of the time.

To extract the lumber from his new investment, Goodyear first organized the Sinnemahoning Valley Railroad. This line ran from Keating Summit, Pennsylvania, on the Buffalo, New York & Philadelphia Railroad (later part of the Pennsylvania Railroad) to his sawmill in Austin, Pennsylvania. The Sinnemahoning Valley Railroad ran from Keating Summit (Forest House) east to a switchback and then south down the north branch of Freeman Run toward Austin.

The Sinnemahoning Valley Railroad opened officially as a common carrier on December 14, 1885. Although most of the lumber railroads of the time and area were 3-footers (narrow gauge), Goodyear used his foresight in building his logging railroads of permanent quality to a standard gauge and laid with 70 pound rail, which really paid off in the future. In Austin, Goodyear built a huge sawmill, and brought all his timber here by rail to get cut. Then in 1886 he extended the line 13 miles (21 km) south to Costello, Pennsylvania, where there was a large sole leather tannery. The leather tanneries used the hemlock bark, which was a by-product of the saw mills, to create tannin. This allowed him to benefit greatly by supplying one industry with the waste product of another.

In 1887 he joined with his brother to create the firm of F. H. & C. W. Goodyear. In the end, it was this firm that owned most of the properties, mills, railroads, locomotives and multiple other assets. Starting in 1891, the Sinnemahoning Valley Railroad was extended north west up past Galeton, all the way to Ansonia, where it connected with the Fall Brook Railway. To get here, the railroad had to cross a large ridge. To accomplish this, the railroad built four large switchbacks, instead of tunnels. This may have been acceptable thinking at the time, as the line was still primarily a logging railroad, where switchbacks were quite common. These switchbacks limited trains to 15 cars.

Starting in the early 1890s, an initiative was started to build a number of smaller lines linking the Sinnemahoning Valley Railroad at Costello, up to Galeton and east to Ansonia. At this point that there already was a narrow-gauge line running from Galeton north east up to Addison. The Addison and Pennsylvania Railway was started in 1882 from Addison, reaching Gaines and Galeton by 1885.

In 1891, The Buffalo and Susquehanna Railroad Company (of 1891) was started in Galeton and headed south west 14 miles (23 km) to Cherry Springs, Pennsylvania. Cherry Springs is at the top of the hill, between both sets of switchbacks.

At the same time, in 1891, the Susquehanna Railroad Company connected the Sinnemahoning Valley Railroad at Costello, heading north east to Hull, 14 miles (23 km) away. This line went from Costello, south to Wharton, then north east up to Conrad. Conrad was Hull Station.

Both of those lines were completed by 1893, when the Cherry Springs Railroad Company was created and completed the connection of 9 miles (14 km) from Hull to about 2 miles (3.2 km) from Cherry Springs, Pennsylvania. The Cherry Springs Railroad literally connected the 14-mile (23 km) Buffalo and Susquehanna Railroad (of 1891) with the 14-mile (23 km) Susquehanna Railroad. This connecting line proceeded north west from Conrad, up the hill, to just past the first switchback, to the top of the hill, at Cross Fork Junction.

The Cross Fork Railroad Company connected here at the top of the hill, and proceeded 13 miles (21 km) back down the hill, south, to the logging boom town of Cross Fork. Cross Fork grew quickly to have 2500 residents at its peak.

Started in 1892, the Coudersport and Wellsboro Railroad Company (not to be confused with the Wellsville, Coudersport, and Pine Creek) was now finished in 1893, building east from Galeton to Ansonia, Pennsylvania, where it connected with the Fall Brook Railway.

In 1893, now that all the little lines were finished, the Buffalo and Susquehanna Railroad (of 1893) was created as a result of the merger of the Sinnemahoning Valley Railroad, the Buffalo and Susquehanna Railroad Company (of 1891), the Susquehanna Railroad, the Cherry Springs Railroad, and the Cross Fork Railroad.

At this point, the Buffalo and Susquehanna Railroad's main line now started with a connection with the Buffalo, New York & Philadelphia Railroad at Keating Summit, utilizing a small switchback it proceeded south east, past Austin and Costello, where at Wharton the line proceeded northeast up the grade. About 14 miles (23 km) south of Galeton, four large switchbacks were required to get over the ridge and into Galeton. The mainline continued past Galeton and made a connection with the Fall Brook Railroad at Ansonia. The main offices for the Buffalo and Susquehanna assumed the old offices of the Sinnemahoning Valley in Austin, Pennsylvania.

== Construction and expansion ==
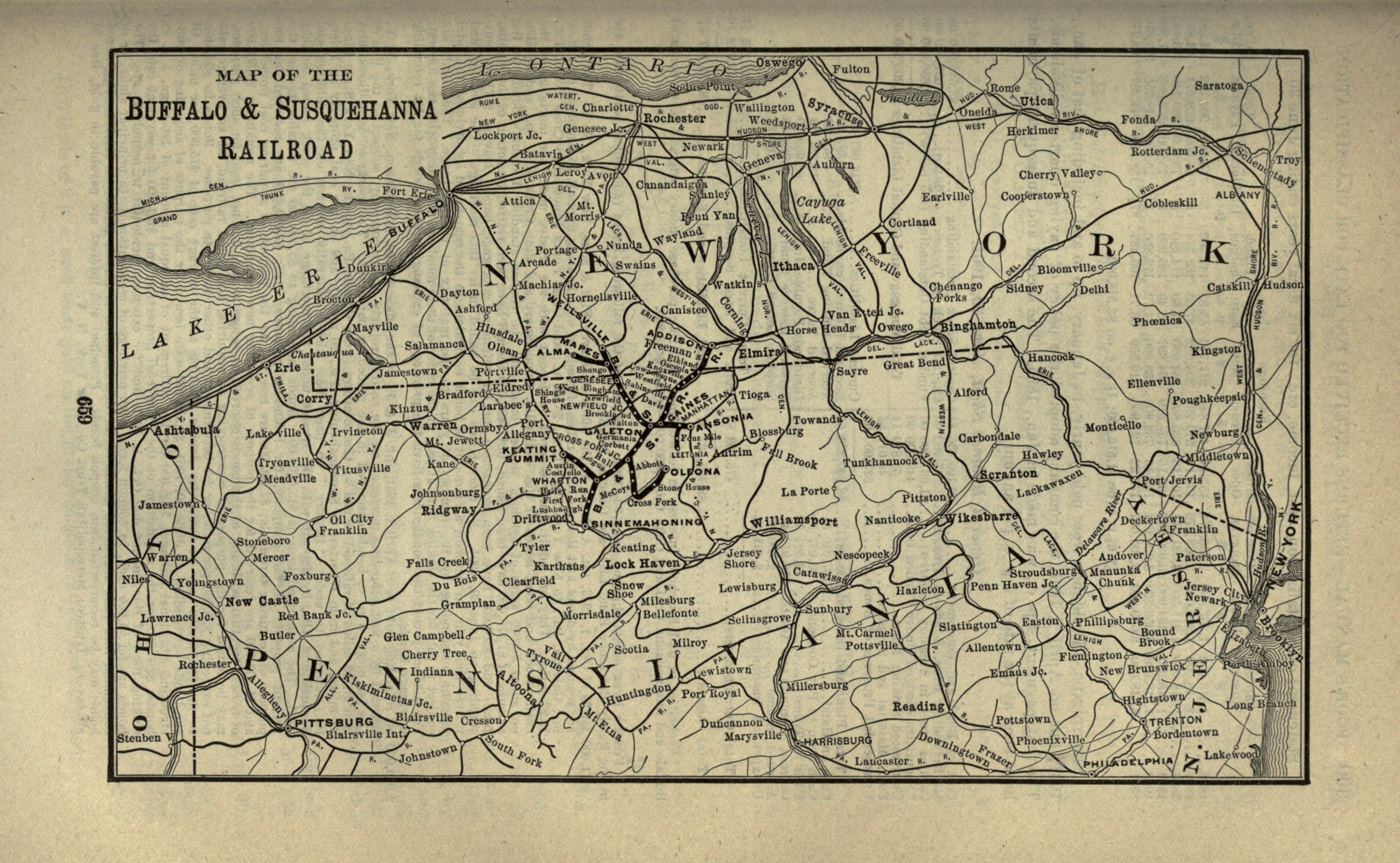
The B&S route in 1901

The Buffalo and Susquehanna Railroad now extended 62 miles (100 km) from Keating Summit to Ansonia, with a 13-mile (21 km) branch to the booming logging town of Cross Fork.

By 1893, it is reported that Frank Goodyear owned ten locomotives.

The line was served by a number of Shay logging locomotives, based out of Austin, Pennsylvania, as well as a Baldwin 2-8-0 locomotive. With the expansion into Galeton, the Buffalo and Susquehanna Railroad now needed more locomotives, and purchased eleven new locomotives in 1894 and 1895. (probably from Baldwin)

Many construction railroads and temporary lines were being built by the B&S, or the F. H. & C. W. Goodyear company, or the lumber companies themselves, to service the timber transport in the area. The Lackawanna Lumber Company, Emporium Lumber and Central Pennsylvania Lumber company all used the main lines of the Buffalo and Susquehanna Railroad tracks with their equipment. Most of these companies were owned or partnered with the Goodyear brothers.

As the lumber and tanning business expanded, Frank Goodyear was joined by his brother Charles W. Goodyear. Upon reorganization, Frank Goodyear stepped down as president of the railroad and assumed the positions of first vice president and chairman of the board. Goodyear's brother, Charles, became second vice president and general manager of the railroad, while Marlin Olmsted became president.

In 1895–1896 the B&S RR Company built a 37-mile (60 km) extension north-west from Galeton to Wellsville, New York, where the B&S now connected with the New York, Lake Erie & Western (Erie Railroad). The Goodyear's had purchased timber lands along the Pine Creek, north of Galeton, a few years previous, and now it was time to start logging those properties. Very soon the Goodyear brothers built a large lumber mill in Galeton, also.

At Wellsville, there operated a short line called the Wellsville, Coudersport and Pine Creek Railroad. It ran south about 10 miles (16 km) from Wellsville to Hickox (just south of Genesee). It was a small operation with plans of eventually extending south to Coudersport. The WCPC was forced to lease their railroad to the B&S under threat of a parallel track. (the B&S actually started grading a parallel ROW to force the issue) It was leased on January 1, 1896, for 85 years at $8250 a year. The B&S acquired their only locomotive.

As of 1896 the B&S had sixteen locomotives, fourteen passenger cars and almost seven hundred sixty freight cars.

Along this north-western line to Wellsville, about halfway from Galeton to Genesee, there existed a 5-mile (8.0 km) stretch of very severe grades, with a peak grade of 2.84 percent. Curves and twists were used to get over the hill, requiring the B&S to use multiple engines on even average sized trains.

In 1895, the original narrow-gauge line that ran from Galeton to Addison, the Addison and Pennsylvania Railroad, converted from narrow gauge to standard gauge. This simplified interchange and operations in the Galeton area, as the B&S was driving a lot of business in the area, and the Addison and Pennsylvania Railroad was hoping to get a bigger share of the traffic. This would not be the case, as Frank Goodyear had other plans.

Starting on March 18, 1896, the Buffalo and Susquehanna Railroad had extended from Ansonia, Pennsylvania, into Corning, New York, via trackage rights over the Fall Brook Railroad. The Buffalo and Susquehanna railroad paid the Fall Brook Railroad 14 cents per ton for the 43 miles (69 km) to get to Corning, New York. At Corning the B&S could interchange with the New York, Lake Erie & Western (Erie Railroad), for markets east (like New York City). This implies that the Buffalo and Susquehanna did not use the Addison and Pennsylvania Railroad to reach the New York, Lake Erie & Western (Erie Railroad) at Addison, New York, and from there, Corning, instead having a trackage agreement with the Fall Brook Railroad from Ansonia.

Eventually, in 1898, the Goodyear brothers purchased the 45-mile (72 km) Addison and Pennsylvania Railroad (from New York Senator Thomas C. Platt) running from Galeton, Pennsylvania, to Addison, New York. At this time, the Buffalo and Susquehanna Railroad built the half mile connector track at Gaines Junction to link this new line with their existing line from Galeton to Ansonia, and abandoning the 4.5 miles (7.2 km) of parallel track that ran from Gaines to Galeton.

With the Buffalo and Susquehanna railroad now owning a direct route to Addison, New York (and another eastern connection with the New York, Lake Erie & Western Erie Railroad), the trackage rights agreement for traffic into Corning, New York with the Fall Brook Railroad was allowed to expire on June 1, 1898.

One wonders if the Fall Brook Railroad ever knew of the Buffalo and Susquehanna's real intentions. At this point, a business partner now became a direct competitor, as the B&S now competed directly with traffic into the Corning area, as well as the parallel track in Westfield, Knoxville, and Elkland. It did not matter much by then anyway, as the Fall Brook Railroad was leased into the New York Central and Hudson River Railroad in 1899.

With the hub of activities now greatly centered on Galeton, in 1894–1898 the B&S moved its base of operations from Austin to Galeton and began construction of a large yard, six-stall engine house, car repair shop, freight and passenger station. This included new and modern brick structures. Around this time, there was another railroad that connected from Germania to Galeton, the Galeton South Branch and Germania Railroad, which was probably a small logging railroad. Also at this time, the lumber mill operations of Galeton were beginning to surpass the huge operations in Austin.

By 1899, the Buffalo and Susquehanna Railroad was reported to have modern and comparative facilities with a total of 19 locomotives:

- 10 (2–8–0) consolidations of 70–98 tons
- 4 (4–6–0) 10-wheelers of about 65 tons, all Baldwins except 1 (Brooks)
- 5 (4–4–0) eight wheelers

F. H. & C. W. Goodyear Co. was reported to have an additional 12 Shays for use by their lumber companies.

By the late 1890s, the operations of the Goodyear's lumbering company was noted as being the most extensive in the state of Pennsylvania. The mills at Austin, Galeton, and Cross Fork were the most modern in style, and included all the newest and most up-to-date machinery. The mill at Austin was listed as the largest in the state. The Goodyear's employed 2400 men, working 10 hr day. They owned 11 log loaders manufactured by the Marion Steam Shovel Co. (Goodyear owned the patent). Five shay engines moved 207 log cars. One Shay locomotive could handle two log loaders, and about 30 log cars. There were 75 miles (121 km) of logging railroads, which were constantly moved around to uncut parts of the forest. These logging railroads then connected with the Buffalo and Susquehanna Railroad. It was reported in 1898, that the Goodyear's had 10 years worth of timber left. Some of the mills operated 22 hours per day, and used electric lights to keep the men working at night.

In Cross Fork, the Lackawanna Lumber Company had two mills. They operated 2 standard locomotives, 2 shay locomotives, 3 log loaders, with a total of 70 log cars. Almost 20 miles (32 km) of rail had been built by the Lackawanna Logging Company at Cross Fork, who also constantly moved the tracks to fresh areas to be cut. In addition, uncut logs were also brought in to Cross Fork by the Buffalo and Susquehanna Railroad from other nearby areas.

In 1900, the Buffalo and Susquehanna was reported to have:

- 22 Locomotives
- 17 Passenger Cars
- 761 Freight Cars

== South for coal and lumber ==
By 1900–1901, the Buffalo and Susquehanna Railroad built an extension from their mainline at Wharton, Pennsylvania, south through Sinnemahoning, Pennsylvania, connecting with the Philadelphia & Erie Railroad (later part of the Pennsylvania Railroad) near Driftwood, Pennsylvania. This line was then extended further south to the area of Du Bois Pa, in 1902–1905. The line to Du Bois was full of new opportunities for the Goodyear brothers. Halfway between Driftwood and Du Bios was a small town named Medix Run, Pennsylvania. This area is located near the current Moshannon State Forest, and became a big lumbering town for the Goodyear brothers and the Buffalo and Susquehanna Railroad.

Medix Run was already established as a small lumbering and coal center before the Buffalo and Susquehanna railroad came. In 1893, the Medix Run Lumber Company was built, and in 1894, and small tannery was built. By 1895 the Medix Run Railroad was built for almost 12 miles (19 km) to a local coal mine. By 1905, as the Buffalo and Susquehanna Railroad was being built past Medix Run, the Goodyear brothers bought the existing mill, the Medix Run Railroad, and 20,000 acres (81 km^{2}) of local forest.

Frank Goodyear relocated his original (F. H. & C. W. Goodyear) Shay Locomotive, #1, from Wellsville, New York, to Medix Run, to assist in the busy lumbering operations. Also, later, Shay #12 was officially moved to Medix Run, as operations picked up. By 1906, the Goodyear brothers (Goodyear Lumber Company, incorporated in Buffalo, New York, in 1902) were now the largest lumber company as a whole, and had the first and second highest producing mills in all of Pennsylvania, with their fourth busiest mill being in Medix Run. The productivity of the Goodyear lumber mills for 1906 is listed below:

Galeton – 92 million feet

Austin – 72 million feet
Medix Run – 50 million feet

Cross Fork – Lackawanna Lumber Co. – 69 million feet

Southwest of Medix Run, the [Du Bois, Pennsylvania] area was rich in Bituminous coal, which became the Goodyear brothers' next major interest, to supplement their lumbering interests. By 1905, the Buffalo and Susquehanna Railroad had extended 55 miles (89 km) south to Sykesville, Pennsylvania, with plans to continue south into the larger coal regions. At the same time, the Goodyear brothers started buying up coal mines in the area.

Earlier, the Buffalo and Susquehanna Railroad company had bought the property of the Clearfield Coal Company in Tyler, Pennsylvania, in 1901 and subsequently created the Buffalo and Susquehanna Coal (and Coke) Company. In 1902, some coal properties of the Berwind-White Coal Mining Company were purchased by the Buffalo and Susquehanna Coal Company near Du Bois, as well as lands from the Peale, Peacock, and Kerr coal company, some 10 miles (16 km) south of Du Bois.

In 1903, the Gross Earnings (all income) had reached $1 Million for the year ending June 30, with Net Earnings being $432,000, and the surplus (or profit) being $138,000. Significantly heavier traffic had increased their operating costs as compared to 1902, including increases in salaries, while at the same time their insurance went up, as their valuation went up.

By 1904, the Buffalo and Susquehanna Coal and Coke company was the 6th largest mining company in the region, with 284,000 tons mined. Overall, there was a 25 percent increase in Bituminous coal mining since 1900. By 1905–1906, the Buffalo and Susquehanna Railroad owned most of the stock and bonds of the Buffalo and Susquehanna Coal and Coke company and Powhatten Coal and Coke Company.

Addition purchases and mining rights brought the Buffalo and Susquehanna Coal and Coke Company's assets to an estimated 120 million tons of coal. The largest of the Buffalo and Susquehanna Coal and Coke mines was at the southern end, in Sagamore, Pennsylvania, where an estimated 2 million tons per year could be mined from this single drift mining plant alone.

To reach their largest coal holdings at Sagamore, the Buffalo and Susquehanna Railroad had to build southwest of DuBois, and then lease trackage rights from the Buffalo, Rochester and Pittsburgh Railway Company. For a distance of 16 miles (26 km) between Stanley, Pennsylvania, to Juneau, Pennsylvania, the B&S had to use the tracks of the BR&P, with a 20-year lease agreement. The 21 miles (34 km) from Juneau to Sagamore were owned and operated by the B&S. It is unclear why the Goodyear's had to accept this agreement to run the B&S on the BR&P's tracks between Stanley and Juneau. It seems to go against every thing the Goodyear's were trying to accomplish.

The town of Sagamore did not exist before the Buffalo and Susquehanna came. So when in the late fall of 1905, the railroad was completed to the area, the first couple of trains were used by the Hyde-Murphy Company, to ship in materials for the construction of the first ninety houses in Sagamore. Building continued as needed, and by the 1920s, 500 houses had been built.

The Sagamore mine was built with the most modern equipment, and of the highest capacity. The mine operation was built for an anticipated production of 10,000 tons per day (about 250 fully loaded 40-ton coal cars, per day), which equaled 3 million tons per year. Needless to say, this production number was never met. By 1907, the production of the Sagmore mine was quickly catching up to the production of the DuBois mines, both averaging over 500,000 tons per year. Total production for 1907 was listed as almost 1.1 Million tons of coal, which amounted to about 27,500 fully loaded 40-ton coal cars being shipped per year on the Buffalo and Susquehanna Railroad. In 1907 the mine in Medix Run was closed and abandoned.

Production at the Sagamore mines continued to increase steadily. By 1914, the Sagamore mines had reached 3rd place in production, compared to all the other mines in their local districts. Total production at Sagamore was now 794,277 tons out of almost 1.3 Million tons. That total amounted to about 32,500 (40 ton) coal cars for the Buffalo and Susquehanna per year, or about 90 cars per day.

== North to Buffalo ==
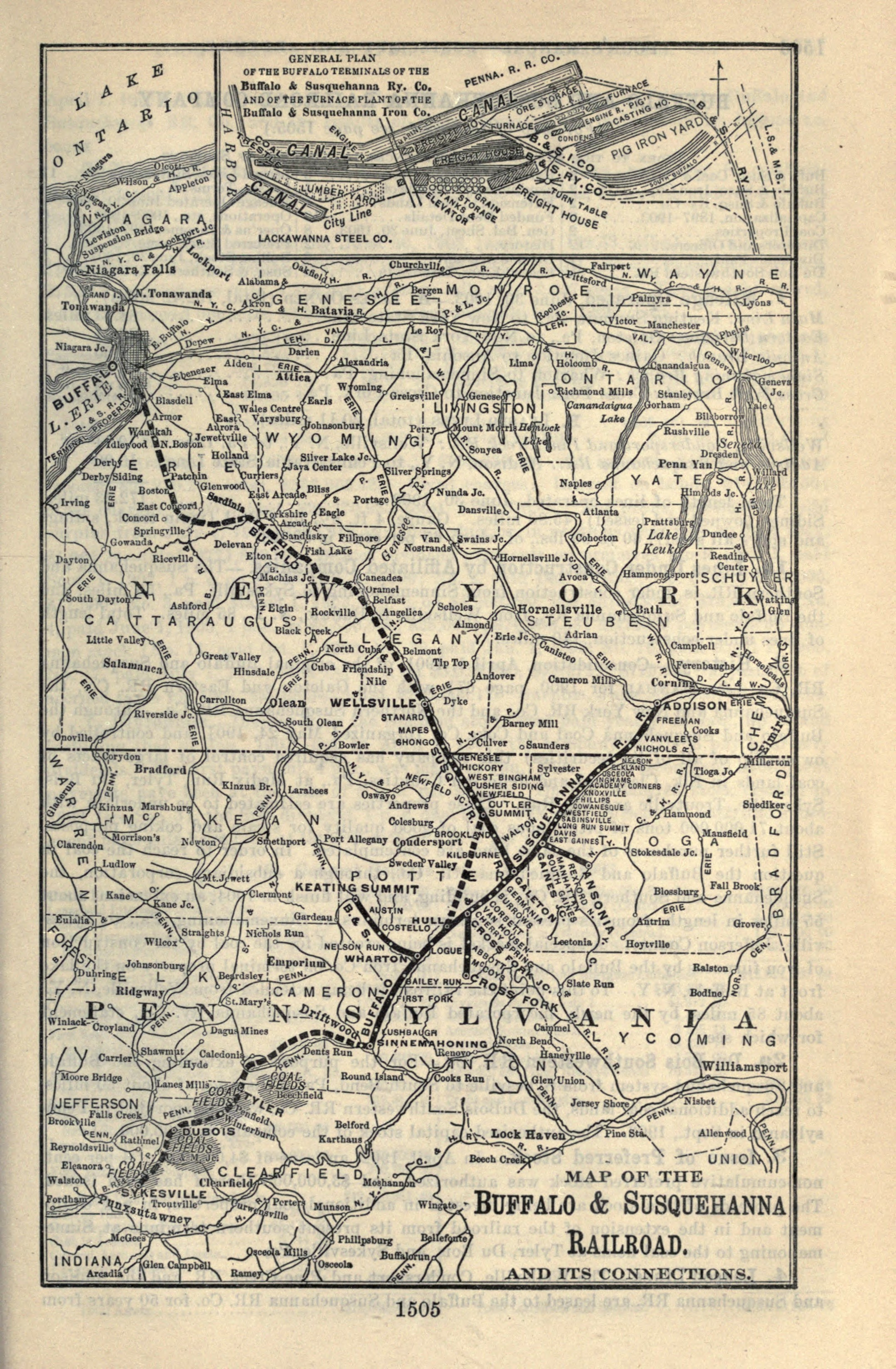
The B&S route in 1903, with planned expansion to Buffalo and Sagamore started.

As the Goodyear lumber and coal empire flourished, the Buffalo and Susquehanna Railroad did well moving tons of coal, coke, logs, finished lumber, Hemlock bark, hides, finished leather products, and a small but steady number of passengers. The brothers had a goal of getting everything to Buffalo, where they could create companies to use the products from Pennsylvania.

By 1902, more than 140 miles (230 km) of spurs were reported. As coal and lumber supplies were exhausted in one area the track was pulled up and laid in another. The Goodyear brothers continued to buy up timber properties, coal fields, and eventually ore fields throughout the area.

In 1902, Frank Goodyear created the Buffalo and Susquehanna Mining Company, which leased 120 acres (0.49 km^{2}) of Iron Ore land in the Mesabi Range, Minnesota, with an estimated 15 Million tons of ore. To get this iron ore from Minnesota to Buffalo, he created the Buffalo & Susquehanna Steamship Company. Two freighters, the Frank H. Goodyear and the S. M. Clement, were built to carry ore from the company's mines in Minnesota and Michigan down to Buffalo.

To get the coal to Buffalo, the Goodyear brothers incorporated the Buffalo & Susquehanna Railway in 1902 to build north from Wellsville to Buffalo, a total of almost 90 miles (140 km). In order to raise the capital to get to Buffalo, the brothers went public with their company and raised $17,000,000 for the completion of their railroad.

In 1901, a $15,000,000 mortgage on the property of the Buffalo & Susquehanna Railroad Company was filed in the Register and Recorder's office at Wellsboro, Pennsylvania. Fisk & Robinson, one of the best-known bond houses in Wall Street funded the bond. This money helped the railroad fund the railroad's operations, and its expansions south to Sagamore and north to Buffalo.

With this additional funding, in 1904 the brothers also built two large blast furnaces in Buffalo for their coal and ore, at a cost of over $4,000,000. The Goodyear brothers created the Buffalo and Susquehanna Iron Company. This new company was a joint venture between the Goodyears and William A. Rogers of Rogers, Brown & Company.

In July 1903, the bond holders Fisk and Robinson stated that the 84-mile (135 km) extension to Buffalo would be completed by the summer of 1904 (the line was mostly completed in 1906), and that upon completion the line would be leased for 999 years for interest on the bonds and a 4% dividend. The regular 4 percent dividend was issued for the 1903 year.

Currently the coal from the Buffalo and Susquehanna Coal and Coke Company's mines were using the Pennsylvania Railroad connection at Keating Summit to get from the mines on the southern end of the line to the furnaces in Buffalo, since the extension to Buffalo was not complete yet. The Goodyear brothers desperately wanted to control all of the transportation of the coal to their mines, so they needed to quickly finish the extension north to Buffalo.

By this time, extensive terminals were acquired by the Buffalo and Susquehanna Railway in South Buffalo located on Lake Erie, right next to the furnaces of the Buffalo and Susquehanna Iron Company.

A giant ship canal Union Ship Canal was jointly built and used by the Buffalo and Susquehanna Railroad, the Buffalo and Susquehanna Iron Company, the Pennsylvania Railroad, and the Lackawanna Steel Company. This giant canal allowed more than enough room for the steamships to bring in the iron ore from Michigan and Minnesota to be reduced to pig iron.

The Goodyear brothers incorporated the Buffalo and Susquehanna Terminal Railroad to do the daily switching of the coal and ore trains around the blast furnaces, the four large modern steel elevators and the foundry.

With the opening of the mines on the southern part of the line, the need for cars and locomotives increased greatly. In 1907, it was reported that the Buffalo and Susquehanna Railroad owned:

- 40 locomotives
- 32 passenger cars
- 2498 freight cars
- 87 service cars

The line to Buffalo was almost completed in 1906 and linked the coal and timber lands of Pennsylvania to the ore ships of Goodyear's Buffalo & Susquehanna Steamship Company in Buffalo. The route that was finally chosen was: north out of Wellsville, down the Genesee River Valley to Belfast, then across the hills to Arcade. From Arcade the B&S went west to Springville, then north again down the Boston Valley to Buffalo. During construction, the B&S built their line south from Hamburg and the two lines met near the village of Boston.

September 1906 saw regular service begin as far as Springville, as there was still plenty of work to do to get the line into Buffalo. The B&S ran no Pullman service, but offered a buffet and parlor car in operation between Buffalo & Galeton. It advertised as "The Grand Scenic Route" and offered patrons Sunday excursions including a popular one spent at Crystal Lake . The B&S had its right of way through the Erie County Fair Grounds and transported many Buffalonians and out of town fair goers to the Fair.

Although a great accomplishment at the time, there were already a number of established rail routes to get from North Central Pennsylvania to Buffalo. This new route was redundant, longer, inefficient with higher grades and switchbacks, and unnecessary.

Although the line to Buffalo was technically completed by late 1906, there were still no passenger facilities. In February 1907, an arrangement was made with the Erie Railroad to use their tracks to facilitate regular Buffalo and Susquehanna passenger service to Buffalo starting on February 4, 1907. An agreement was previously made with the Lake Shore and Michigan Southern Railway to allow usage of their tracks, but it was noted that it would be quite some time before such a connection could be finished, so the Erie arrangement allowed passenger service to start almost immediately.

With its northern and its southern extension now complete, the Buffalo and Susquehanna Railroad now ran 250 miles (400 km) from Buffalo, New York, to Sagamore, Pennsylvania, and had more than 400 miles (640 km) of track. Galeton, its center of operations, now had 4000 residents (1910 totals).

In 1907 the Goodyear brothers formed a new railroad called the Potato Creek Railroad which hauled freight and passenger service. The Potato Creek railroad connected with the Buffalo and Susquehanna Railroad at Keating Summit, Pennsylvania, and ran 14 miles (23 km) to Norwich, Pennsylvania. The Goodyears had a large lumber mill at Norwich, similar in operations as the mill at Cross Fork. In order to obtain the land to build the railroad, some of the properties needed to be condemned. This required that the Potato Creek Railroad be incorporated as a common carrier. In 1912, the Potato Creek line became busier as the Pennsylvania Stave Company was moved from Cross Fork to Betula. The logs were cut in Norwich, and transported to Betula for Stave making. Cut wood was also transported to the Keystone Chemical Company at Keystone. The final product of all of these industries eventually made their way onto the Buffalo and Susquehanna Railroad.

Early on, coal and coke from the south end of the system generated considerable revenue, as did the operation of tanneries along the line, including the one at Costello, Pennsylvania, which was reported at the time to be the largest in the world.

Between 1905 and 1910 Brooks and Pittsburgh (Brooks Locomotive Works and the Pittsburgh Locomotive and Car Works) built forty-six 2–8–0s, numbered 123–168 to handle the increasing traffic from the coal heading to Buffalo.

From 1901 to 1907, the Buffalo and Susquehanna had doubled in size as its main business shifted from hauling lumber to hauling coal and coke to Buffalo. The Goodyear brothers improved and upgraded the infrastructure, ordered a number of new cars and locomotives for the increased traffic. The brothers had taken out a large mortgage, went public with the company, invested heavily in the iron company and terminals in Buffalo, and now were desperately seeking the returns on their investments. They would never see any.

Only a few months after the agreement to run the passenger trains on the Erie Railroad to get to Buffalo, Frank H. Goodyear died in May 1907. His brother, Charles W. Goodyear, took over.

== Bankrupt ==
Once completed in 1907, the Buffalo & Susquehanna Railway (Buffalo to Wellsville) leased the Buffalo & Susquehanna Railroad (the rest of the system) for 999 years, and operated the whole as the Buffalo & Susquehanna Railway. Along with the B&S Railroad went the Addison and Susquehanna Railroad, extending from the state line to Addison, New York, and the Wellsville Coudersport and Pine Creek Railroad, extending from the state line to Wellsville, New York. By now, it was proving to be really difficult and expensive to have a single rail line to Buffalo for the sole purpose of only moving your own freight.

In early 1908, all the railroad unions from Chicago to New York were given notice that wages were to be cut for most railroad workers on all lines in the Spring. The Buffalo and Susquehanna was asking for a 10% reduction in salaries. Officials of the Switchman's Union declared that if salaries were reduced, the union would strike on the Buffalo and Susquehanna Railroad first.

About this time, the long and old mine spur to Gurnee was abandoned about 1910. This spur was around in 1884, when the line was still a part of the Addison and Northern Pennsylvania Railroad. It was 4.5 miles (7.2 km) long and went to a coal mine, and was near Davis Station on the line to Addison.

In the end of the aughts, the Government and the ICC were gaining power and were cracking down on companies and railroads. In the Spring of 1909, The Buffalo and Susquehanna Railroad and the Buffalo and Susquehanna Coal Mining Company were accused by the government of breaking Tariff Laws. The Railroad was indicted by a Federal Grand Jury for failure to observe tariff laws and granting concessions. The coal company was indicted for accepting those concessions.

While labor and the Unions were tightening their grip on one side of the Buffalo and Susquehanna Railroad, and the Regulators and the ICC were tightening their grip on the other side of the line. But the worst was yet to come.

In December 1909, the Buffalo and Susquehanna Iron Company was taken over by the Rogers-Brown Iron Co, who also now had partial ownership of the Powhatten Coal Company mines in Tyler and Sykesville. It is unclear exactly why this happened, as Rogers was a partner with Frank H. Goodyear in the original company. With Frank now dead, it may just have been that Rogers bought out his ownership and then reorganized the firm. Fisk and Robinson was also the bond holders of the old iron company.

Very shortly after, in February 1910, Fisk and Robinson, one of the best-known bond houses in Wall Street, and the company that financed the mortgage of the Buffalo and Susquehanna Railway, admitted insolvency and filed for bankruptcy. To make matters worse, they blamed the financing of the $17 million Buffalo and Susquehanna bonds.

On the same day as the Fisk and Robinson announcement, Buffalo and Susquehanna officials spoke out and declared the Buffalo and Susquehanna was in better financial condition than it had been in the last ten years. By now though, it was clear the line was in deep trouble and Frank Goodyear was no longer around to pull it out.

By the time the line reached Buffalo, the Hemlock lumber industry was beginning to peak, and logging production started to wind down, as many local forests had already been denuded. Lumber shipments started a steep decline after 1910, and never returned.

Two months after the Fisk and Robinson failure, in April 1910, the bond holders of the first $6 million mortgage of the Buffalo and Susquehanna Railway formed a committee to put together a plan of action in the event of a default on May 1.

The expected happened on Friday, May 6, 1910, when the Buffalo and Susquehanna defaulted on its $6 million mortgage interest payment. Both the Buffalo and Susquehanna Railway and the Buffalo and Susquehanna Railroad filed for bankruptcy. Harry I. Miller was immediately appointed receiver of the road by offering $150,000 bond and taking possession of the property of the road. H. I. Miller had been president of another Goodyear family railroad, the New Orleans Great Northern, and was familiar with the line.

Ten more 2-8-0 locomotives had been previously ordered from Brooks, to be numbered 169–178, but were never delivered, as the order was canceled when the B&S went bankrupt in 1910. From this group of canceled engines, Buffalo and Susquehanna #169 was sold to the Tooele Valley Railway in Utah as engine #11, and ironically remains as one of only two Buffalo & Susquehanna steam engines in preservation. Also lost forever were the plans to upgrade and improve the line, as the road laid aside plans to extend its line to Pittsburgh and relocate its line to eliminate the four switchbacks over the mountains between Galeton and Wharton.

The unthinkable happened a few weeks after the bankruptcy, when the Great Lakes steamship Frank H. Goodyear, from the Buffalo and Susquehanna Steamship Company, carrying a full load of iron ore from Minnesota to Buffalo, was hit by another ship in the fog, sliced in two, and quickly sank. Most of the crew died, as only five survived.

In late December 1910, H. I. Miller, receiver of the bankrupt Buffalo and Susquehanna Railroad and Railway, told the committee of bondholders that a reorganization plan would not be finalized until at least spring 1911. He was quoted as stating that "snow has so much interfered in past years with the operation of the line, that he is not in a position to make any satisfactory report on the earning power of the road until he has been in charge of the company for a period including the Winter months." Precautions were being taken to prevent the road from being closed during the snow, but he also noted that the equipment was in poor condition.

After being sick for several months, Charles W. Goodyear died on April 16, 1911.

To make matters worse for the profitability of the rail line, Austin, Pennsylvania, which was the Goodyears' center of logging operations in the area, was literally wiped off the map by a large flood on September 30, 1911. The town was all but destroyed by the collapse of a dam. 88 people died as a good part of the town washed down the Freeman Run. This flood, was one of the worst floods in Pennsylvania history, second only to the Johnstown Flood of 1889.

In the early 1890s, the Buffalo and Susquehanna Railroad built a branch line to a small area known as Cross Fork. Eventually, the Lackawanna Lumber Company owned a big mill in Cross Fork, and the town quickly grew and became a center of logging activity for the Buffalo and Susquehanna Railroad. At its peak the town had about 2500 residents when the timber supply was exhausted and the Lackawanna mill closed in 1909. When the stave and heading mill closed in 1912, the population quickly fell from 2000 to 60. The stave mill was dismantled and shipped to Betula on the Potato Creek Railroad. In 1913, the B&S ended passenger service and abandoned the line. Tracks were removed in 1914 from Cross Fork Junction to Cross Fork.

The Buffalo extension was a burden, never realizing any earning potential. It is clear from the official reports that from the moment the extension opened it caused great deficits that continued to grow. Even when revenue and tonnage went up, the losses continued to grow. Between 1904 and 1907, the average profit every year was $288,000. In 1908, the first full year of operating the Buffalo extension, the railroad lost $593,000. In 1909, the loss was $509,000, and in 1910 the loss was over $765,000. It was clear to all concerned that the Buffalo and Susquehanna Railway could not survive, that the line to Buffalo was a drain on resources, and that the entire operation had failed.

Very quickly, both the railway and the railroad were sold off. In 1913 the Buffalo and Susquehanna Railroad was sold under foreclosure at Coudersport, Pennsylvania, for $5,000,000, and the Buffalo & Susquehanna Railroad Corporation was now formed. The old bond holders received 70 percent bonds in the new company and some stock, while the old preferred stock holders received options to buy new stock at a reduced rate. This worked out fairly well for the old shareholders of the railroad. The same could not be said for the shareholders of the railway.

The Buffalo and Susquehanna Railway continued to lose money, reporting losses in 1912 and 1913. No matter what they did, they just could not make the line from Wellsville to Buffalo profitable, as gross revenue for 1913 was $643,842, but operating losses were reported as $170,201.

In September 1915, the property of the Buffalo and Susquehanna Railway was finally sold. This sale included the line operating between Wellsville and Buffalo, consisting of about 90 miles (140 km) of trackage, several stations, and rolling stock. The $6,000,000 mortgage foreclosure was sold for only $300,000.

The Bond Holders Committee sold the property for about $800,000 to the Susquehanna Finance Corporation, who then formed the Wellsville and Buffalo Railroad. This transfer included three 2-8-0 engines. The Wellsville and Buffalo Railroad leased the line back to the Buffalo and Susquehanna Railroad Corporation.

From July 1916 to November 1916, the Wellsville and Buffalo Railroad reported 492 passenger train movements, an average of over 3 trains per day. The bad news was that 56% of those trains were reported an average of 19 minutes late. As a comparison, the Buffalo and Susquehanna Railroad only reported 33 percent of its passenger trains an average of only 8 minutes late. It is easy to see why the Wellsville and Buffalo Railroad could not last very long with these results. As it had no real freight traffic or industries on the line, the passenger traffic was about all there was left, at this point, and with most trains being almost 20 minutes late every day, it never build up a solid, profitable, passenger base.

They ran the line for less than a year, from December 15, 1915, to November 17, 1916. Surprisingly, in early 1916, the Public Service Commission authorized the Wellsville and Buffalo Railroad Corporation to sell $850,000 in common capital stock. It did not matter much, though; by fall 1916, the losses prevented further operation, and the line was officially closed with final intent to salvage. World War I in Europe had increased the demand for scrap metals, so the line was quickly ripped up and the scrap sold.

Although the Wellsville and Buffalo Railroad was not running trains, the corporation survived a bit longer. In 1917, the Arcade and Attica Railroad (recently formed from the foreclosed Buffalo, Arcade and Attica Railroad) had received permission from the Public Service Commission, to run its trains on the former Buffalo and Susquehanna Railway in the village of Arcade for a distance of about 1.5 miles (2.4 km). The Arcade and Attica Railroad was authorized to acquire the property of the Buffalo and Susquehanna Railway, and other structures and equipment, in the village of Arcade, and lease this property for seven and one half years from the Wellsville and Buffalo Railroad Corporation. The Arcade and Attica Railroad spent $46,000 to purchase 2 engines, lease, and to rehabilitate the ex-Buffalo and Susquehanna Railway line.

The Public Service Commission also granted approval for the construction of the Nickel Plate Connecting Railroad to use the same rights as the former Wellsville and Buffalo Railroad in the village of Blasdell for certain road crossings. The Buffalo, Rochester and Pittsburgh Railway also obtained some ex-Wellsville and Buffalo tracks near Crystal Lake.

== Reorganization and revival ==
In 1914 the Buffalo and Susquehanna was listed as having:

- 62 locomotives
- 486 box cars
- 49 flat cars
- 3341 freight cars
- 16 passenger cars

This asset list helped the railroad greatly in the next couple of years, as demand for coal and other freight began to surge.

In 1915, the Buffalo and Susquehanna was listed as having traffic Agreements with the Pennsylvania Railroad at Driftwood, Sinnemahoning, and Keating Summit. They also interchanged freight with the Erie Railroad at Addison and Wellsville. They also had a connection with the New York Central and Hudson River Railroad at Ansonia. What is surprising about this list is the fact that the Buffalo, Rochester and Pittsburgh Railway is missing. The Buffalo and Susquehanna had a lease agreement with the BR&P to run B&S trains on their tracks for 21 miles (34 km), from Sykesville to Juneu, to access the B&S mines at Sagamore, for 20 years. Its odd that there was no traffic agreement listed for them to interchange cars in that area. In 1917, the Buffalo and Susquehanna Railroad dropped their traffic agreements with the Buffalo, Attica and Arcade Railroad, as well as the Pittsburg, Shawmut and Northern, since they no longer had a connection via the Wellsville and Buffalo Railway.

Immediately after the reorganized Buffalo and Susquehanna Railroad Corporation dropped the Buffalo extension, it became profitable once again. The line had an increase in freight and coal shipments due to the war in Europe. Dividends once again began to get issued, 4 percent in 1915, increasing to 5 percent in 1915. By 1918, the Buffalo and Susquehanna had applied to the Railroad Administration to issue a 7 percent dividend for the year.

Since the Buffalo and Susquehanna Railroad owned almost all of the stock and bonds of the Buffalo and Susquehanna Coal and Coke company, they profited greatly from these holdings. Due to the demands of World War I, in 1918 the Sagamore and DuBois mines were now both the number 1 ranked mines in tonnage, in their districts. The Sagamore mine reached almost 1.1 Millions tons, while the DuBois mine shipped out almost 661k tons, for a total of 1,750,337 tons of coal. This ranked the Buffalo and Susquehanna Coal and Coke company as the 16th largest coal company in Pennsylvania. The railroad got an estimated 35,000 (50 ton) coal cars to move.

In the spring of 1918 an extremely heavy rainfall caused most of the waterways in the area to flood over their banks. A Buffalo and Susquehanna Railroad passenger train, headed to Addison, slid into the Cowanesque River near Knoxville. The cars came to a standstill in several feet of water, as several passengers were injured. Fortunately for all involved, the cars remained upright when they slid down the embankment.

World War I saw the railroad controlled by the United States Railroad Administration, as all railroads were, and by 1920, they were independent again, less the wear and tear. To compensate them for their losses, the Buffalo and Susquehanna Railroad Corporation received $593,000 in Federal compensation.

The Transportation Act of 1920 initially had the Erie Railroad controlling the Buffalo and Susquehanna, but later revisions seem to have them allocated to the Baltimore and Ohio System. The Transportation Act also set the limits of excess earnings of railroads at 6%. In either case, nothing ever came of the planned consolidations, as the Buffalo and Susquehanna continued to operate independently and profitably, as no consolidations took place.

Dividends were again being issued in the early 1920s, as the Buffalo and Susquehanna Railroad continued to profit greatly from their coal investments. The Sagamore mines had reached their maximum production during World War I, and the coal boom continued into the early 1920s. By that point, roughly 1,600 men worked at Sagamore and the total population of the town reached about 3,000.

Revenue was up greatly, and the Buffalo and Susquehanna Railroad peaked financially with a 10 percent dividend issued for the year 1920. On August 3, 1921, the Interstate Commerce Commission, complying with the Transportation Act of 1920, published a tentative plan for consolidation of railroad properties into a limited number of systems. The Buffalo and Susquehanna would have fallen into System 4, under the Erie Railroad.

Consolidations of Railroads – System 4:

Erie RR

New York, Susquehanna and Western
Delaware and Hudson
Delaware Lackawanna and Western
Ulster and Delaware
Buffalo and Susquehanna

Wabash lines east of Missouri River

In 1920, the Goodyear's lumber mill in Norwich closed. The Potato Creek Railroad was owned by the Goodyears until about 1924 and then operated until 1928 by Keystone Chemical Company and then finally abandoned. The town of Norwich followed the path of Cross Fork and faded from history. The rest of the lumber mills in the area followed shortly, as most of the forests had exhausted their supplies of wood by now.

Although profitable, in 1922, the Buffalo and Susquehanna Railroad tried to significantly cut the pay of its Telegraph Operators. The President of the Order of Telegraph Operators claimed that the Train Master of the Buffalo and Susquehanna Railroad traveled the entire line, telling operators that if they did not accept the pay cuts, their stations would be closed. The General Manager of the Buffalo and Susquehanna had to appear in front of the Railroad Labor Board, and claimed that the board had no jurisdiction in the matter.

In December 1922, the stock of the Buffalo and Susquehanna Railroad Corporation saw an amazing 37 percent increase, as a significant amount of stock was sold. The rush on the stock was due to a previously announced $10 dividend, payable December 30.

On December 30, 1922, the Interstate Commerce Commission reported to Congress that approximately 40 railroads in the United States had earned more than the 6 percent fair return standard set by the Transportation Act of 1920, yet none of them had returned any money, as set in the provision. The Buffalo and Susquehanna was listed as one of the Class 1 providers that did not return any of their excess earnings. The Buffalo and Susquehanna Railroad Corporation declared that the returns were tentative and not binding. Most other railroads denied the liability and contested the provisions of the act.

In continued defiance of the Transportation Act of 1920, the Buffalo and Susquehanna declared an extra dividend of 2 1/2% for the year ending 1923. In November 1924, it was announced that the Buffalo and Susquehanna was expected to purchase 200 to 400 new hopper cars for their successful and profitable coal operations.

As the 1920s unfolded, the bituminous and anthracite coal industries quickly collapsed. World War I had left the coal industry overly expanded. By the end of the 1920s, coal production had fallen 38 percent. Average working days were cut to 187 days per year (3.5 work days per week). Price for a ton of coal was cut in half, from $3.75 to $1.70. There were too many suppliers producing too much coal. In return, the coal mining companies began to cut wages and production. In retaliation, the head of the Miners Union created "the Jacksonville Agreement" which required that all miners get $7.50 per day. By this point, though, many companies just could not pay that, and broke their contracts with the UMWA, which could cause strikes, or worse.

The Sagamore mines, as well as the coal mines in most of western Pennsylvania remained virtually closed for two years and the quality of life in Sagamore as well as in other nearby coal towns suffered a dramatic change.

The union lost out completely and some men took their families to the cities. Union men who remained in Sagamore received notices of eviction from company houses. Later, Buffalo and Susquehanna Coal and Coke Company officials took stronger measures against more persistent activists; company police arrived and removed both furniture and people from their homes. A number of small store owners in Sagamore soon declared bankruptcy as old customers disappeared, often leaving unpaid bills behind. Non-union miners, called "scabs" by residents of Sagamore, were brought in by the Buffalo and Susquehanna Coal Company to occupy the evicted houses.

Union men at Sagamore, among the last in District 2 to surrender their charter, retaliated by dynamiting company houses and singing spirited union songs as they paraded in front of the hotel. Within a year, however, despite these last-ditch efforts, most of the original settlers of Sagamore were gone.

In the end, the non-union operations at the Sagamore mines of the Buffalo and Susquehanna Coal and Coke Company ceased, and the strikes ended, as the mine was officially closed on April 4, 1925.

At this point, all coal shipments on the Buffalo and Susquehanna Railroad were over. This had a disastrous effect on the railroad. The coal traffic accounted for 2M of its 2.4M tons of traffic (1917). With these mine closings, the railroad just lost almost 80 percent of its traffic base.

Eventually, in 1927, the mines in Sagamore again opened, but without the union. Wages were half what they were in 1924, and production was low.

== Baltimore and Ohio era ==
In February 1929, the Baltimore and Ohio notified the Interstate Commerce Commission of its intent to ask for permission to buy the Buffalo and Susquehanna Railroad Corporation. By August 1929, the Baltimore and Ohio had proposed offering $6.3 million for the Buffalo and Susquehanna. The proposal from the Baltimore and Ohio was thought to be acting in advance of the Pennroad Corporation. The Pennroad Corporation is the company created to hold all the assents of the Pennsylvania Railroad, which was thought would also want the Buffalo and Susquehanna.

By October 23, 1929, it was reported that progress in the plan to merge the Buffalo and Susquehanna Railroad with the Baltimore and Ohio had been indicated the previous day by the approval for listing of deposit certificates of the former on the New York Stock Exchange. By December 1929, the Baltimore and Ohio announced its intention to seek approval to create a new, shorter route, between Chicago and New York City. In January 1930, the B&O declared that if they got control of the Buffalo and Susquehanna and the Buffalo, Rochester and Pittsburgh Railway, they would need 73 miles (117 km) of new trackage. This new route would then have saved the B&O 203 miles (327 km) between Chicago and New York.

By March 1930, the Baltimore and Ohio was given approval to obtain stock control of the Buffalo and Susquehanna Railroad Corporation, and with that, the B&O started the process of buying up as much of their stock as they could. Also with that approval came some resistance. The Delaware and Hudson Railway asked the Interstate Commerce Commission to disapprove the decision by the assistant finance director of the commission, declaring that acquisition of the Buffalo and Susquehanna Railroad by the Baltimore Ohio was not in the public interest.

By the spring of 1931 however, it was reported that the Baltimore and Ohio owned 98 percent of the stock of the Buffalo, Rochester and Pittsburgh Railway Company and about 99 percent of the stock of the Buffalo and Susquehanna Railroad. In November 1931, the unification of the Buffalo, Rochester and Pittsburgh Railway Company and the Buffalo and Susquehanna Railroad with the Baltimore and Ohio was finally approved by the Interstate Commerce Commission.

The Baltimore and Ohio was attempting to assemble a short cut across northern Pennsylvania to get from Chicago to New York City. The Buffalo, Rochester and Pittsburgh Railway would have been used to gain access to the Buffalo and Susquehanna at DuBois. The B&O would have used the B&S tracks from DuBois to Sinnemehoning, where a new 73-mile (117 km) line would have been built parallel to the Pennsylvania Railroad tracks, to connect to the Reading Railroad at Williamsport, Pennsylvania.

It is ironic that the Baltimore and Ohio wanted to obtain the BR&P and B&S to get a route to New York City. A few years earlier, the BR&P already had a route to New York City. In 1892 the Buffalo, Rochester and Pittsburgh Railway made a contract with the Beech Creek Railroad and the Philadelphia and Reading Railroad to secure an outlet for soft coal to tidewater (Atlantic Ocean ports, Philadelphia and New York). The Buffalo, Rochester and Pittsburgh Railway built a line (the Clearfield and Mahoning Railroad) 26 miles from DuBois to Clearfield. In Clearfield it connected to the Beech Creek Railroad. The Beech Creek had a connection with the Reading in the town of Williamsport, Pennsylvania. The Reading went all the way to Philadelphia and New York City (via the Jersey Central).

Shortly after the approval of the merger was announced, the Buffalo and Susquehanna announced a $4 dividend, the first in six years since the shutdown of the mines in Sagamore, although now the Baltimore and Ohio was the only stockholder.

In January 1932, the Baltimore and Ohio officially took over operations of the Buffalo, Rochester and Pittsburgh Railway, the Buffalo and Susquehanna Railroad Corporation, as well as all the subsidiary lines, including ownership of the Buffalo and Susquehanna Coal and Coke Company. The Baltimore and Ohio received 44 2-8-0 locomotives.

The Buffalo and Susquehanna still existed, on paper at least, as the B&O assumed all operations. The B&S 2-8-0 engines were renumbered into the B&O system, and some new ones appeared for passenger and express service. The B&O never really put much into the line, only supplying the line with minimal improvements and support. The new shorter B&O route across northern Pennsylvania was soon lost to antiquity, as the Great Depression forced the Baltimore and Ohio to focus on other issues to stay profitable.

In 1933, the new UMWA came back to Sagamore to unionize the mines, again. The union improved conditions for the Sagamore miners, but the town never fully recovered from the 1924 shutdown. The Great Depression continued to make matters worse for everyone. Even with the mines open on limited production, the Great Depression affected everyone, and the small town of Sagamore continued to die off as more and more houses were vacant and getting torn down, some for firewood.

The line from Keating Summit to Austin was abandoned by 1941.

In the early morning of Friday, July 17, 1942, a severe rainstorm hovered over north-central Pennsylvania. A state record was set, when 30.8 inches (780 mm) of rain was recorded at Smethport, Pennsylvania, in only 4.5 hours. This has become the state record, and the limit that all dams and waterways are now built to sustain. This deluge caused widespread flooding all over the areas. Due to this stationary storm system, major flooding occurred in the Sinnemahoning and Wharton valleys. When the flooding receded, dozens of miles of former Buffalo and Susquehanna track was destroyed in and around Sinnemahoning and Wharton, and the line was out of service in those areas.

By November 1942, the mortgage bond holders of the Buffalo and Susquehanna Railroad Corporation met to discuss a proposal to abandon and scrap a total of 53.6 miles (86.3 km) of track. The entire 9-mile (14 km) line southeast from Austin, through Costello to Wharton, and the entire 44.6 miles (71.8 km) of line southwest from Burrows, over the 4 switchbacks, all the way to Sinnemahoning, where the junction with the Pennsylvania Railroad was also abandoned.

This part of the system was underutilized and unpopulated, and required too much work to cross, as it included the four switchbacks that added much delay to any traffic. The costs could never be justified to repair it. Since the lumber mills and industries closed in the 1920s, there was never much traffic on these lines anymore. The abandonment posed some interesting questions for the B&O, though, since it separated the B&O ex-B&S line from Sagamore, up though DuBois to Sinnemahoning from the rest of the ex-B&S lines near Galeton. The remaining line from Keating Summit to Austin was already abandoned by this point. The B&O now required the services of the PRR and the Erie to get access to the rest of the ex-Buffalo and Susquehanna lines.

Passenger service continued on the Addison to Galeton line, served by a fast Atlantic engine until 1947, when one of the older 2-8-0 engines had to take over until the end. Passenger service officially ended on November 19, 1949, due to the loss of its Railway Post Office.

A brief revitalization occurred at Sagamore in 1943, when, because of the demand for coal brought about by World War II, the R&P Coal Company leased the Sagamore mines #13 and #16 from the B&S. But the demand did not last long. The mines were permanently closed and abandoned in 1950. In the early 1950s, the Kovalchick Salvage Company bought the mining plant, and in the 1950s the tipple was demolished.

With the failed attempt to create a shorter route across northern Pennsylvania long gone, and with the mines now closed, the Baltimore and Ohio was looking to sell the disconnected part of the old Buffalo and Susquehanna Railroad.

In 1954, the Baltimore and Ohio officially merged the Buffalo and Susquehanna Railroad Corporation into the parent company, along with the Buffalo, Rochester and Pittsburgh Railway. This was in anticipation of a sale of all or parts of the old B&S.

On January 1, 1956, 97 miles (156 km) of ex-Buffalo and Susquehanna lines from Galeton to Wellsboro, Galeton to Addison, Galeton to Ansonia, and Galeton to Burrows were sold for $250,000 to the H. E. Salzberg Company, who then created the Wellsville, Addison and Galeton Railroad. Included in the sale were six ex-B&S steam engines, four cabooses, one snowplow and a number of work cars. The Wellsville, Addison and Galeton Railroad continued in operation and served the remaining customers until being shut down in 1979.

The other ex-B&S line from Juneau to Sagamore may have existed up to 1957, when the last train was a shipment of 1957 Chevys to the Chevy dealer in Plumville.

The line from Sinnemahoning southwest to Medix Run was terminated in 1955. Since the Galeton lines were now sold to H E Salzberg, the B&O did not need this line to access the Pennsylvania Railroad to use as a bridge to get to the isolated segments.

Between 1962 and 1977, the section from the Sabula tunnel northeast to Medix Run was abandoned. When they built Route 80, a bridge was built over the B&S, and the line terminated just before the tunnel. By 1997, parts of the old B&S still exist and are used by CSX in and around DuBois, to just south of Route 80.
