= Frederick Weber =

Frederick or Fred Weber may refer to:

- Frederick Weber (fencer) (1905–1994), American fencer and pentathlete
- Frederick T. Weber (1916–1942), American naval aviator
- Frederick Theodore Weber (1883–1956), American painter, sculptor, and etcher
- Frederick Parkes Weber (1863–1962), English dermatologist
- Frederick Johann Weber (1881–1967), American photographer
- Fred Weber (singer), American singer
- Fred J. Weber (1919–2007), justice of the Montana Supreme Court

== See also ==
- Fred Webber (Frederick John Webber; 1883–1966), Australian rules footballer
- Frédéric Weber (born 1973), French trade union activist and politician
- Frédéric Albert Constantin Weber, French botanist
