= Indian Congress =

1898 gathering of American Indian tribes

The Indian Congress occurred from August 4 to October 31, 1898 in Omaha, Nebraska, in conjunction with the Trans-Mississippi International Exposition. Occurring within a decade of the end of the Indian Wars, the Indian Congress was the largest gathering of American Indian tribes of its kind to that date. Over 500 members of 35 different tribes attended, including the Apache medicine man Geronimo, who was being held at Fort Sill as a United States prisoner of war.

Frank A. Rinehart's photographs of the Indian Congress participants are regarded as one of the best photographic documentations of American Indian leaders around the start of the 20th century.

== Background ==
In a report on the Indian Congress published in the American Anthropologist in 1899, its chief ethnological consultant, James Mooney credited the realization of the project to "the grit and determination of the exposition managers, foremost among whom was Edward Rosewater, proprietor of the Omaha Bee. The successful outcome was due chiefly to his tireless activity and unfaltering courage. The ethnologic project was the child of his brain, and in spite of serious imperfections, the general result was such—particularly from the practical standpoint of the ticket seller—that we may expect to see ethnology a principal feature at future expositions so long as our aboriginal material holds out." After steady lobbying by Rosewater, an extremely influential Republican and a friend of President William McKinley, and other members of the organizing committee of the Trans-Mississippi International Exposition, in December 1897 a bill was introduced in the United States Congress that provided an appropriation of $100,000 to carry out an Indian Congress at the same time as the Expo. After it passed in the Senate, preparations for the Spanish–American War monopolized the United States House of Representatives, preventing a vote on the bill. In July 1898, $40,000 was made available for the event in the Indian Appropriations Act by the President. That was a month after the rest of the Expo opened. Funding was also made available by the Bureau of American Ethnology, a part of the Smithsonian Institution.

In 1898, W. A. Jones, the Commissioner of Indian Affairs, sent a letter to each Indian Agency to appeal for attendees. The purpose of the Indian Congress, as he stated, was:

It is the purpose of the promoters of the proposed encampment or congress to make an extensive exhibit illustrative of the mode of life, native industries, and ethnic traits of as many of the aboriginal American tribes as possible. To that end it is pro posed to bring together selected families or groups from all the principal tribes and camp them in tepees, wigwams, hogans etc., on the exposition grounds, and permit them to conduct their domestic affairs as they do at home, and make and sell their wares for their own profit.

== Description ==
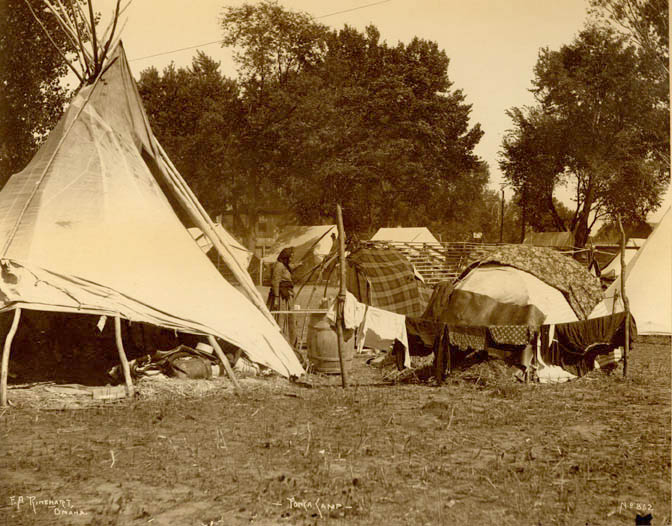
Ponca Tribe encampment.

The entire Indian Congress was managed by ethnologist James Mooney and Army Captain William Mercer of the 8th U. S. Infantry, under the direction of the Commissioner of Indian Affairs acting on behalf of Cornelius Newton Bliss, the United States Secretary of the Interior. The original intention of the organizing committee was to illustrate the daily life, industry and traits of as many tribes as possible. However, once the congress was open authorities realized that the average person attending the Exposition wanted to see dances, games, races, ceremonials and sham battles. Soon the main activities of the Indian Congress were re-enactments and the Ghost Dance.

=== Weather ===
According to Captain Mercer's report, the weather "has been trying in the extreme ... Most of the time we have had extreme heat accompanied by dry, hot winds, which rendered camp life anything but pleasant, the conditions being rendered somewhat worse by our location. Following close upon the heated period we have just had a week of cold, heavy rains which made the camp and life in it more disagreeable even than it was during the hot spell."

=== Criticism ===
Ethnologist Mooney sought for the Congress to display customs of the various tribes. Instead, promoters erected a 5,000 seat grandstand, and arranged the tribes in re-enactments of battles. There were also concerns regarding the Indian Congress hosting a Ghost Dance, particularly after the U.S. Army attacked dancers during the Wounded Knee Massacre in 1890. However, the Ghost Dance was encouraged by the managers of the Exposition. A local newspaper reported the Ghost Dance became a popular attraction. The Ghost Dance shirt of Big Foot was displayed in another part of the Expo.

=== Frank A. Rinehart ===
Mooney contracted with Frank A. Rinehart and Adolph Muhr to take photographs of the attendees. Rinehart made several hundred pictures, regarded as one of the most complete, non-exotifying collections of Native American portraits in existence. Rinehart and Muhr took their photographs in a studio on Expo grounds.

Speaking of his photos of the Indian Congress, Merry Foresta, director of the Smithsonian Photography Initiative at the Smithsonian Institution said, "Rinehart's portraits are really quite extraordinary and put him above the average workaday photographer who might have also made photographs for similar reasons. There were other people working, but he seems to have really, because of the quality of his work, stood apart."

== Attending tribes ==
35 individual tribes were represented by more than 500 Indians. The tribes in attendance included the Apache, Arapaho, Assiniboines, Blackfoot, Cheyenne, Chippewa, Crow, Flathead, Fox, Iowa, Kiowa, Omaha, Otoe, Ponca, Pottawatomie, Sauk and Fox, Lakota, Southern Arapaho, Tonkawa, Wichita, and the Winnebago, as well as the Santa Clara Pueblo.

Mooney's above-quoted observation that ethnology would be "a principal feature at future expositions" proved prophetic, for Indian Congresses were also convened at the Pan-American Exposition in 1901 and the Louisiana Purchase Exposition in 1904.

== See also ==
- History of Omaha
- Native American tribes in Nebraska

== Image gallery ==
Photos taken by Frank Rinehart and Adolph Muhr at the Indian Congress in Omaha.

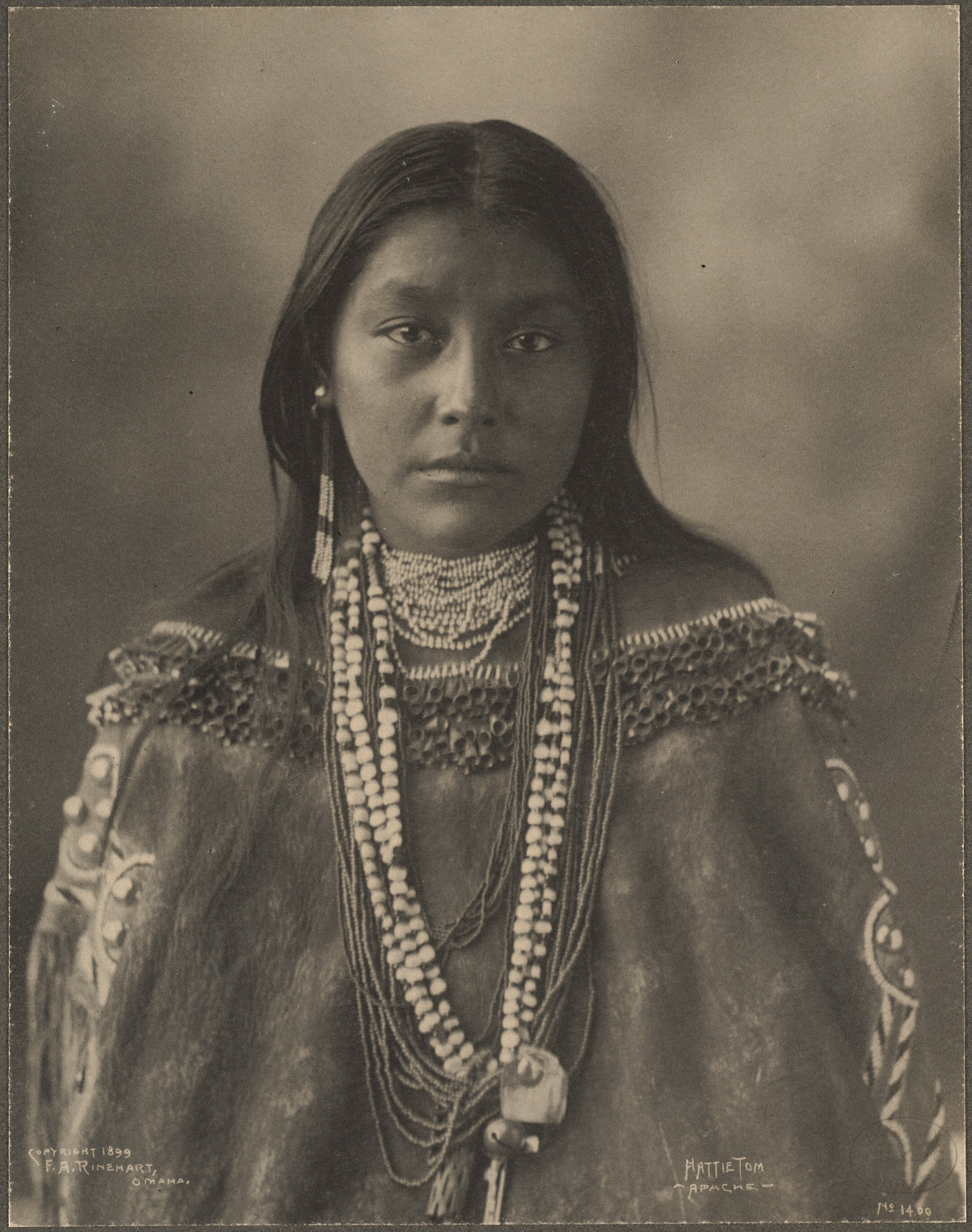
Hattie Tom, Chiricahua Apache.

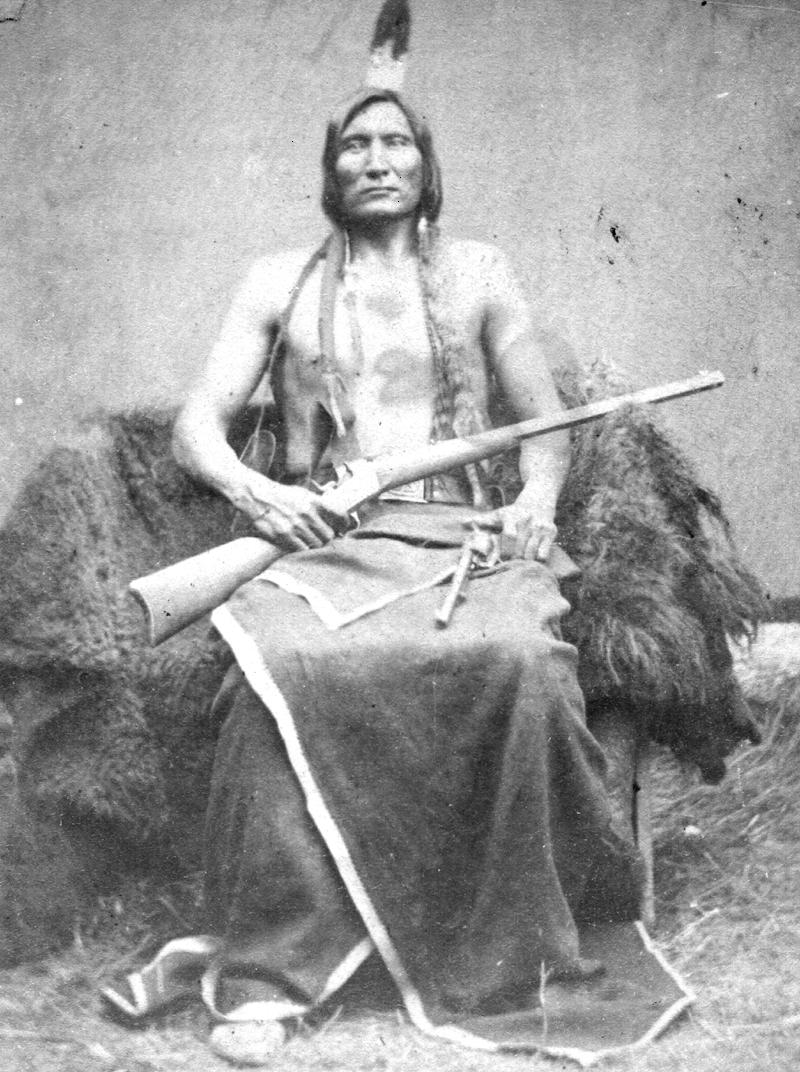
Touch the Clouds, Minneconjou Teton Lakota chief

Sarah Whistler, Sauk and Fox woman.

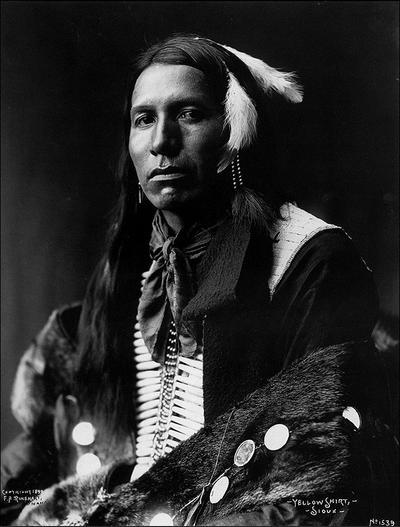
Yellow Shirt, Hunkpapa Sioux chief.

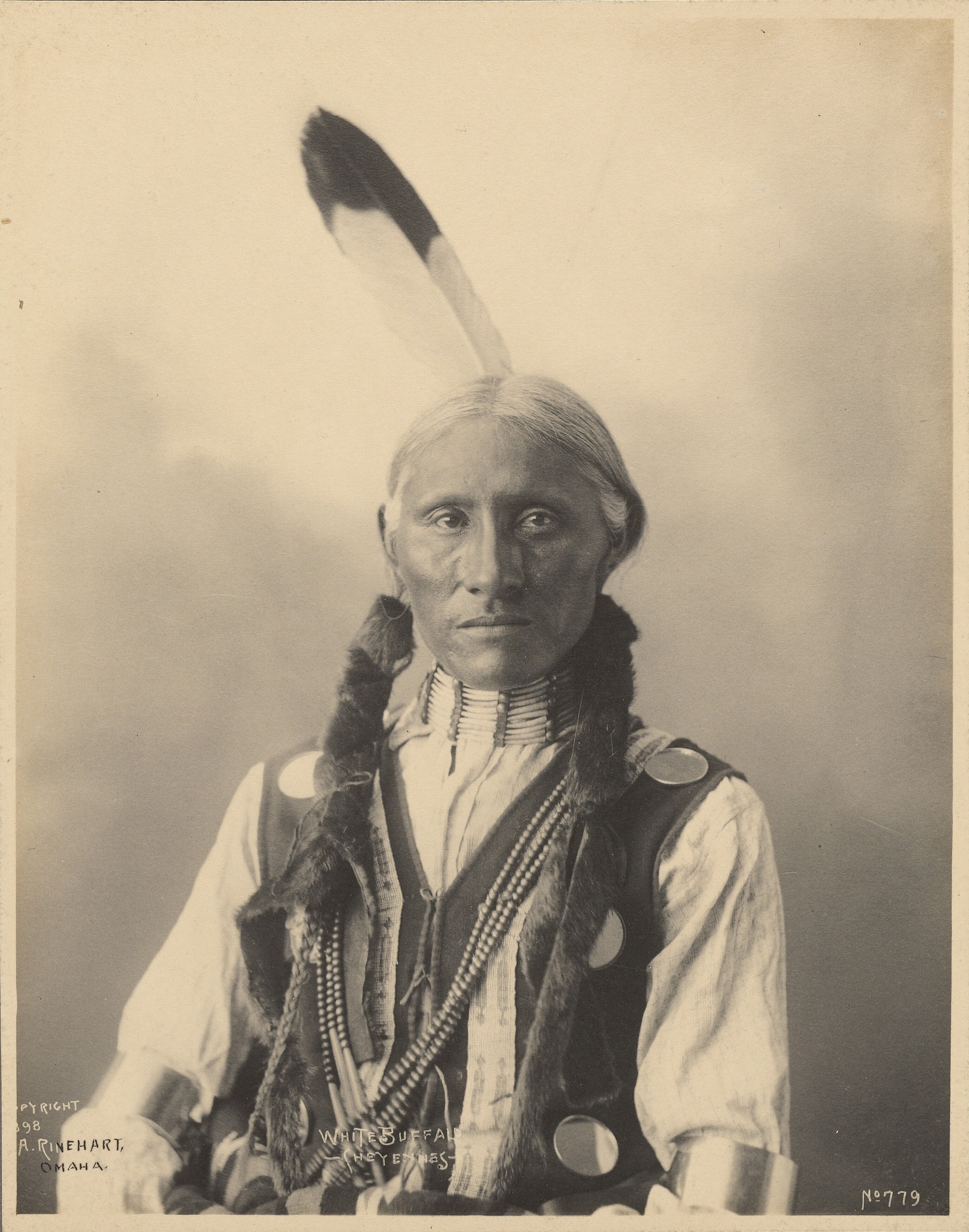
White Buffalo, Cheyenne chief.

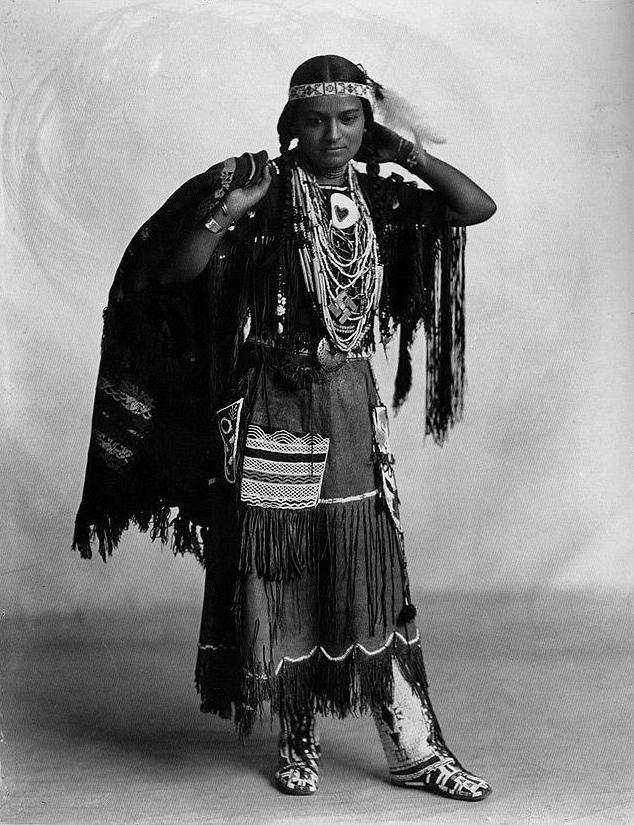
Wah-Ta-Waso, Iroquois woman.

Kicking Horse, Flathead Salish chief.

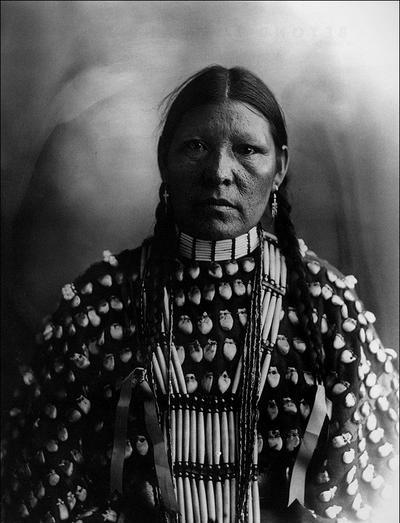
Freckle Face, Arapahoe woman.

Bonie Tela, San Carlos Apache; and Hattie Tom, Chiricahua Apache.

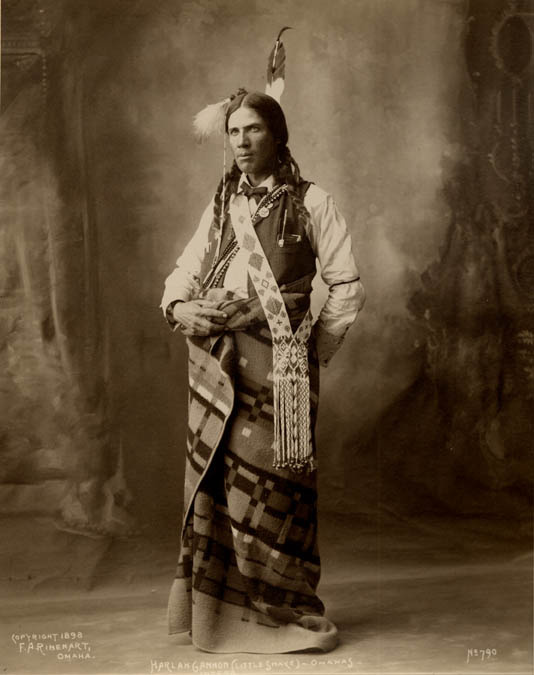
Little Snake, Omaha Tribe interpreter.

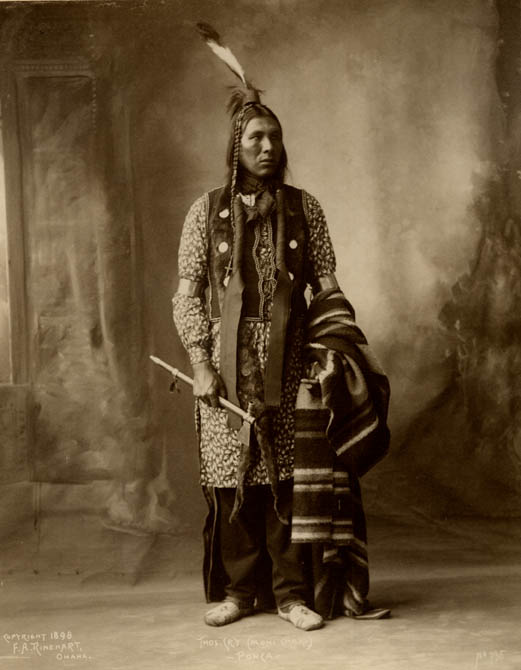
Moni Chaki, Ponca chief.

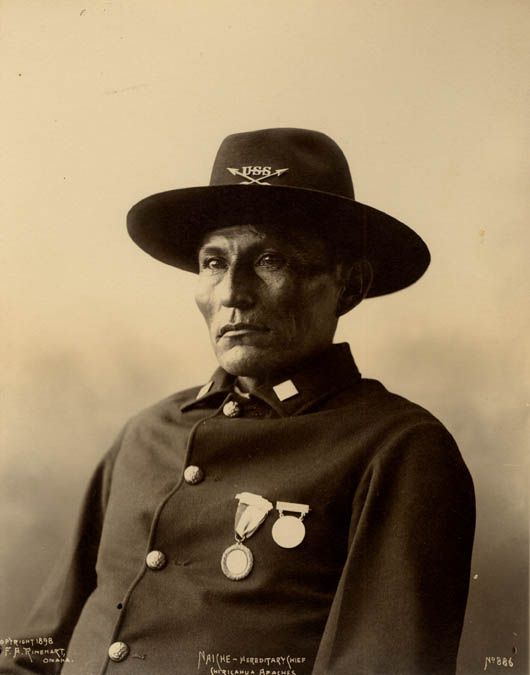
Naiche, Chiricahua Apache chief.

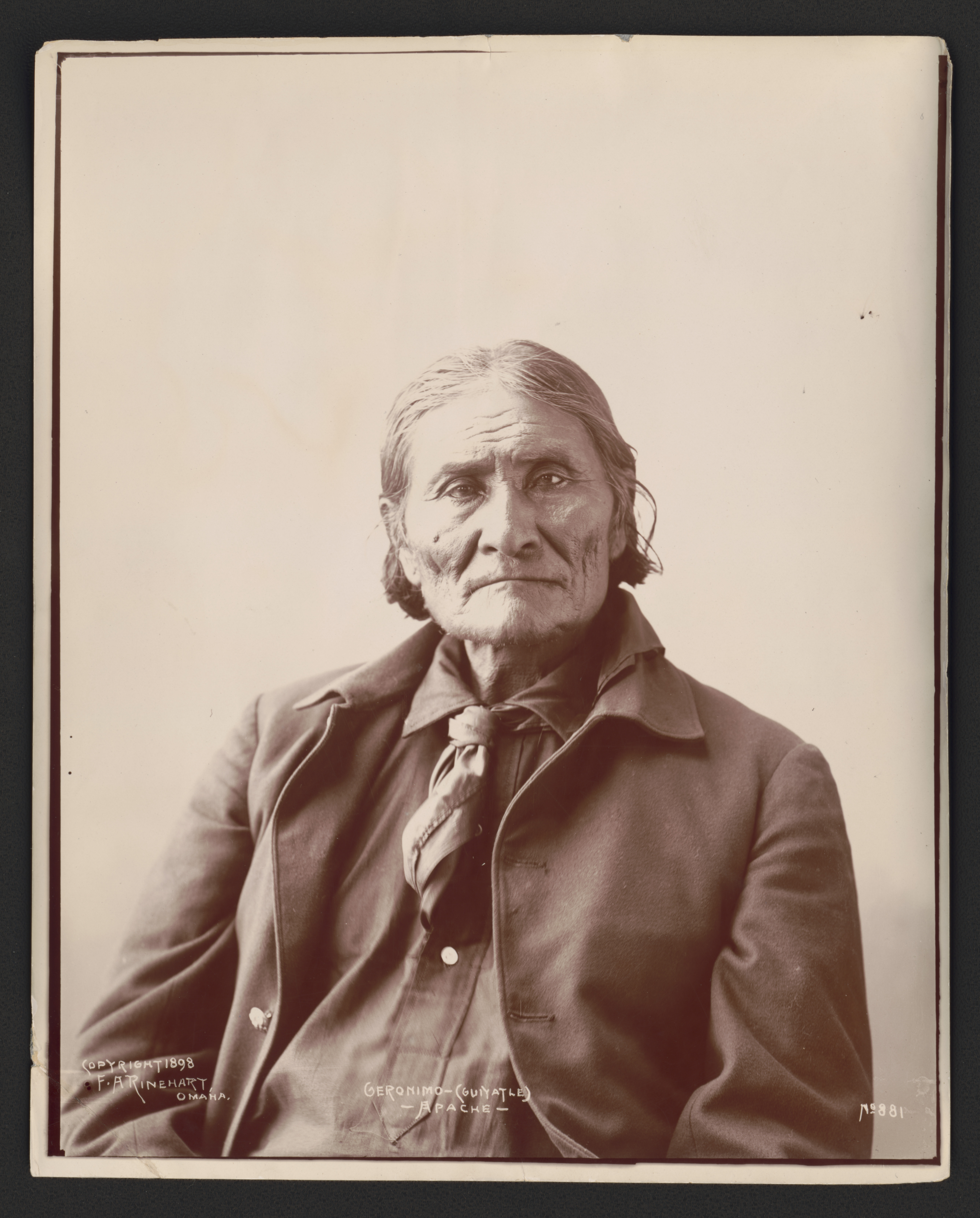
Geronimo, Chiricahua Apache leader.

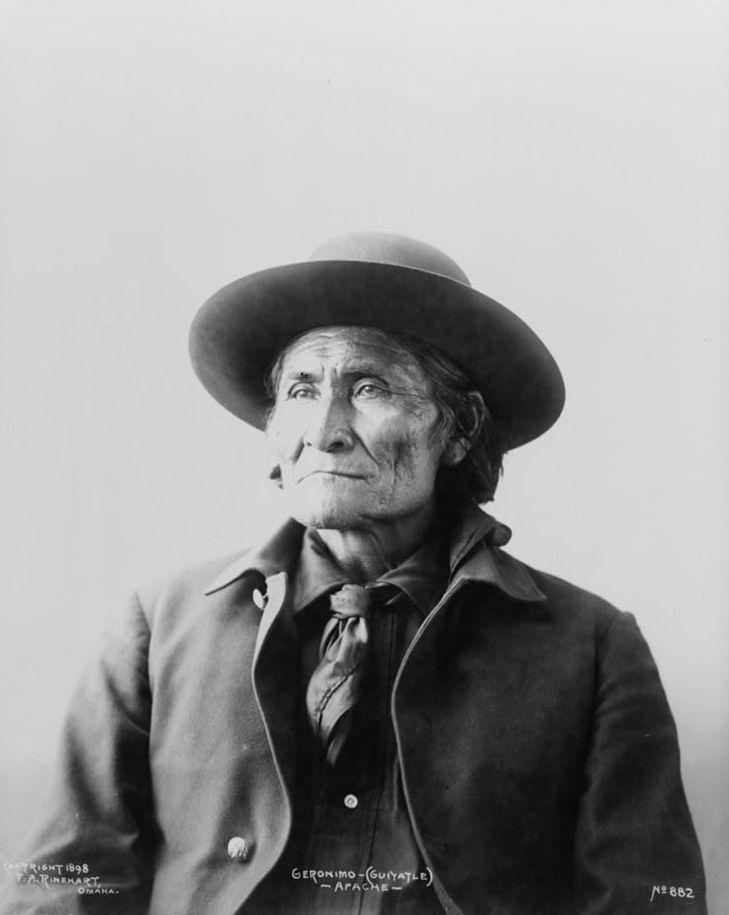
Geronimo.

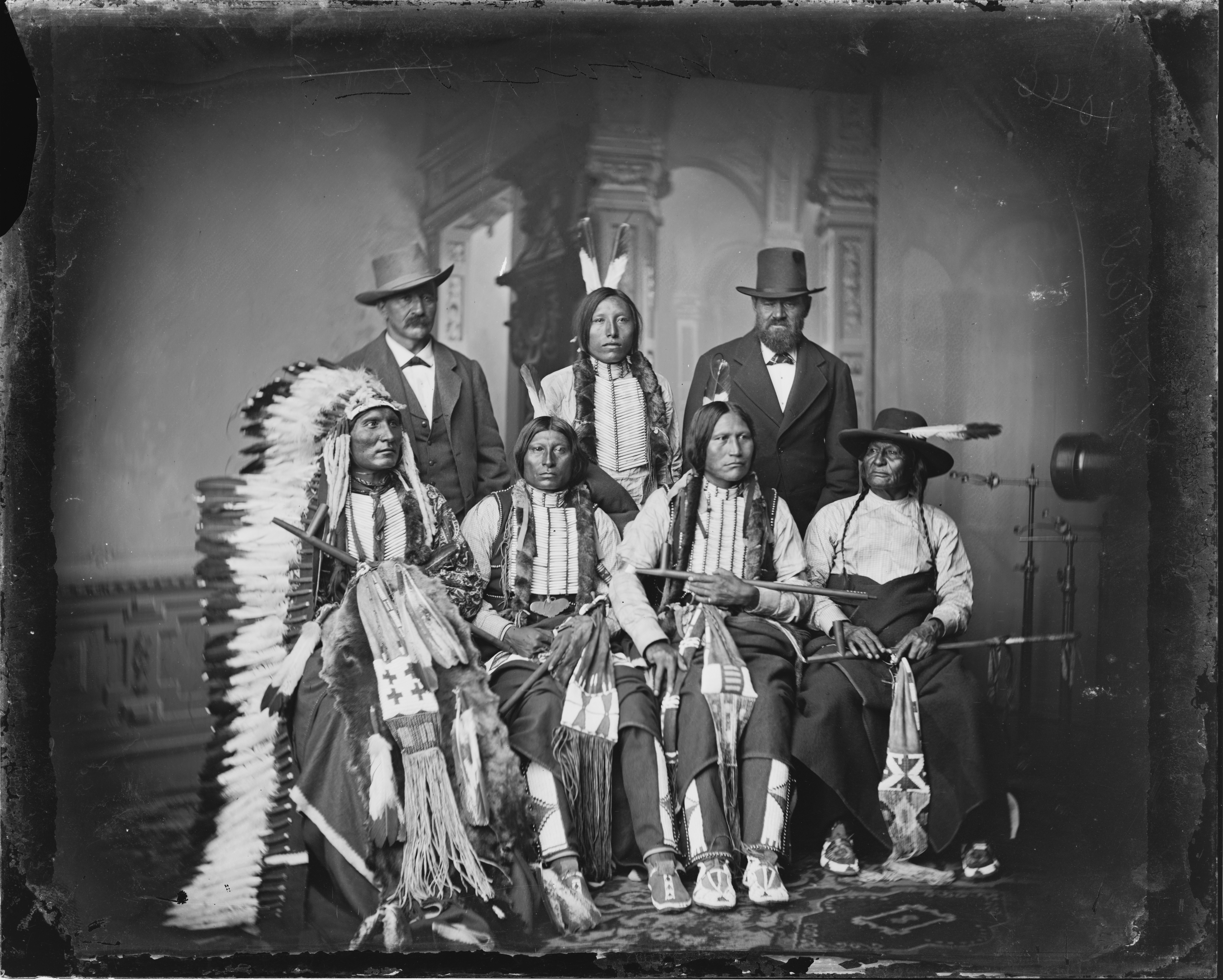
(standing) Joe Merrivale, Young Spotted Tail, Antoine Janis. Seated: Touch the Clouds, Little Big Man, Black Cool, unknown
