= Cornelius Newton Bliss Jr. =

American merchant, humanitarian and art collector (1875 - 1949)

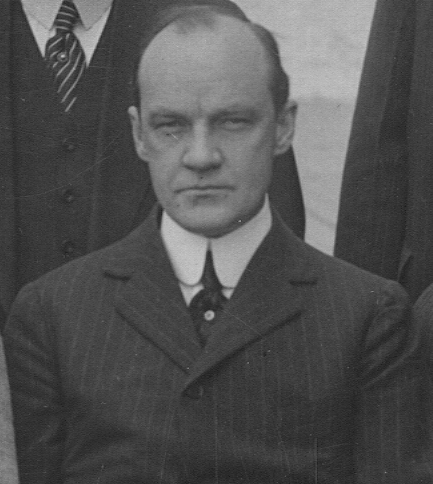
- Bliss in 1917
- Born: April 15, 1875; New York City, U.S.
- Died: April 5, 1949 (aged 73); New York City, U.S.
- Education: Harvard University (BA); New York University (LLD)
- Occupations: Merchant; political organizer; philanthropist
- Spouse: Zaidee C. Cobb (m. 1906)
- Children: 3

Cornelius Newton Bliss Jr. (April 15, 1875 – April 5, 1949) was an American merchant, political organizer, and philanthropist.

== Early life ==
Bliss was born on April 15, 1875, in New York City to Cornelius Newton Bliss, a prominent Republican Party politician later named Secretary of the Interior under President William McKinley. Bliss Jr. was raised in New York City and attended Harvard University, graduating in 1897 with a Bachelor of Arts.

== Career ==
After college, he entered the family dry goods business, later becoming a full partner.

Bliss followed his father's involvement in politics, participating in the presidential campaign of Theodore Roosevelt. In July 1916, he was named treasurer of the Republican National Committee and participated in the losing presidential campaign of Charles Evans Hughes, which he helped operate from New York City. During the campaign, he also served as president of the Association for Improving the Condition of the Poor, a role he filled from 1913 to 1934.

When the United States entered World War I in 1917, President Wilson named Bliss to his War Council, a group of advisers Wilson collected to guide his actions as commander in chief. After the war, Bliss returned to business and philanthropy on a large scale, operating as a trustee, board member, or president of several organizations, including the National Foundation for Infantile Paralysis, Metropolitan Museum of Art, Metropolitan Opera, and the Grant Monument Association.

When the Great Depression began, he was one of six men named by New York City Mayor Walker to operate a $15 million relief fund created in November 1931. Two of the other men were J.P. Morgan and former governor Alfred E. Smith. In 1932, he resigned from the board of his family's company, Bliss, Fabyan and Company. He received an LL.D. from New York University in 1937.

== Personal life ==
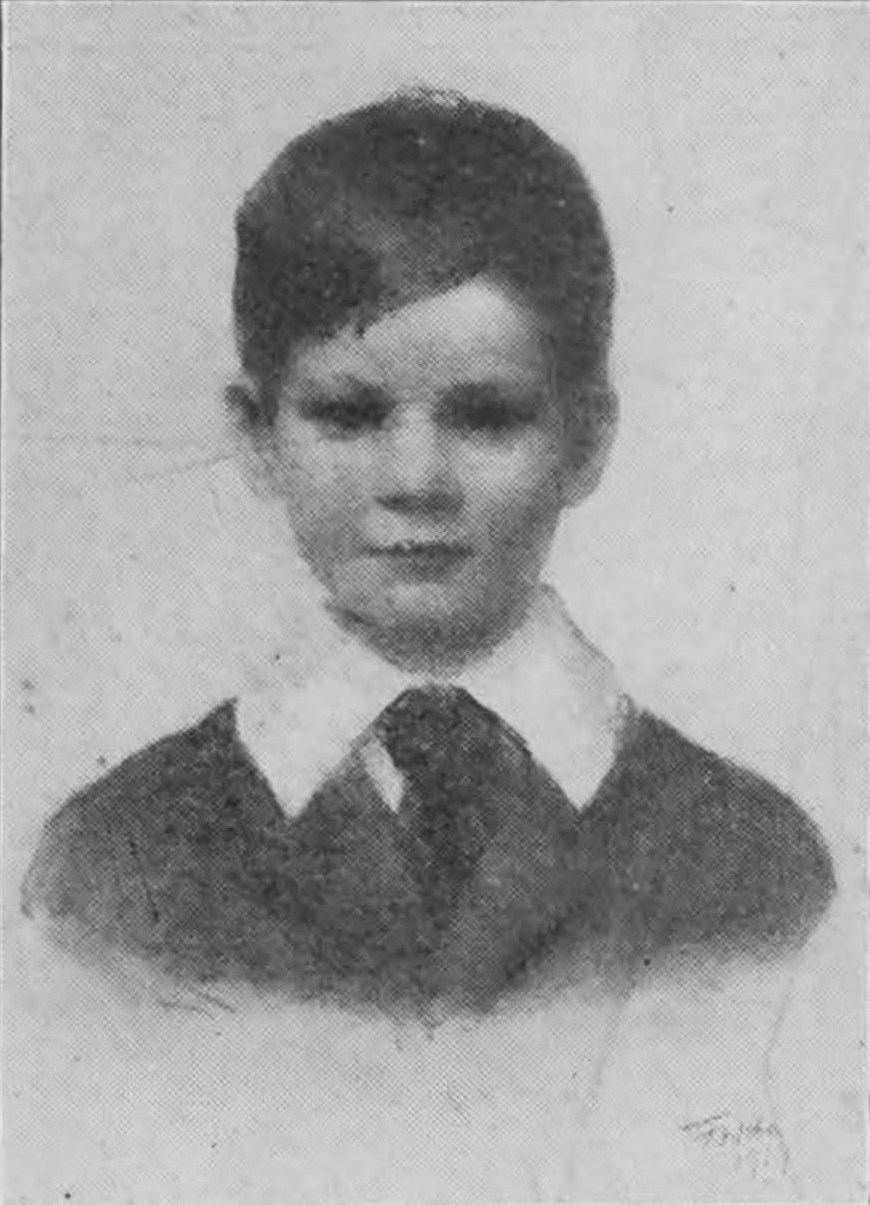
Portrait of Cornelius (Bobby) Newton Bliss III by Weber.

In 1906, he married Zaidee C. Cobb (1881-1966), with whom he had three children:

- Elizabeth Bliss
- Cornelius Newton Bliss III
- Anthony Addison Bliss

Through his later life, he continued to promote the arts, serving as president of the Metropolitan Opera from 1938 to 1946. His sister, Lillie P. Bliss (d. 1931), was the founder of the Museum of Modern Art, and he supported that effort as well. During World War II, he was a chairman of the American Red Cross committee on war activities and became interim chairman of the American Red Cross when regular chairman Norman Davis became ill. He was a member of the famous Jekyll Island Club (aka The Millionaires Club) on Jekyll Island, Georgia.

In late March 1949, he became ill, and died in Roosevelt Hospital on April 5, 1949.
