= Lillie P. Bliss =

American art collector and patron (1864–1931)

- Born: Lizzie Plummer Bliss; April 11, 1864; Boston, Massachusetts, U.S.
- Died: March 12, 1931 (aged 66); New York City, New York, U.S.
- Known for: • Art collector and patron • Museum of Modern Art • Lillie P. Bliss Bequest • Lillie P. Bliss International Study Center

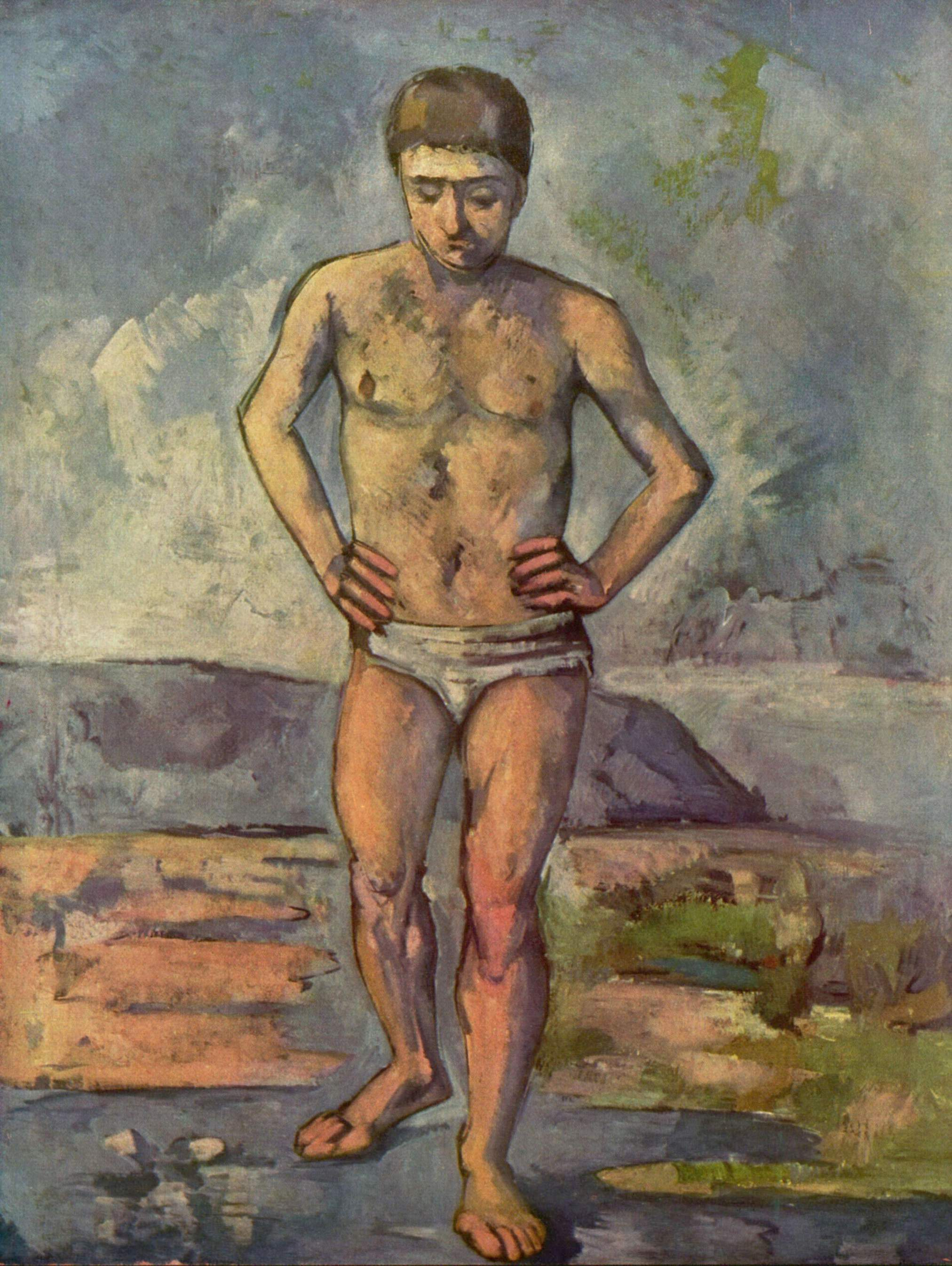
Paul Cézanne: The Bather, 1885–1887, Museum of Modern Art, formerly collection Lillie P. Bliss. Oil on canvas, 97 × 127 cm (38.19 × 50.00 in)

Lizzie Plummer Bliss (April 11, 1864 – March 12, 1931), known as Lillie P. Bliss, was an American art collector and patron. At the beginning of the 20th century, she was one of the leading collectors of modern art in New York. One of the lenders to the landmark Armory Show in 1913, she also contributed to other exhibitions concerned with raising public awareness of modern art. In 1929, she played an essential role in the founding of the Museum of Modern Art. After her death, 150 works of art from her collection served as a foundation to the museum and formed the basis of the in-house collection. These included works by artists such as Paul Cézanne, Georges Seurat, Paul Gauguin, Henri Matisse, Pablo Picasso and Amedeo Modigliani.

== Family and youth ==
Lizzie Plummer Bliss was born in 1864 in Boston, Massachusetts, as a daughter of textile merchant Cornelius Newton Bliss (1833–1911) and his wife, Mary Elizabeth Bliss, born Plummer (1836–1923). Since childhood, her family and friends called her Lillie P. Bliss. Of her three siblings, only her brother, Cornelius Newton Bliss, Jr., born in 1874, reached adulthood. When she was two years old, her family moved to New York City. She did not go to school but was taught by private tutors. Her father held the office of United States Secretary of the Interior under President William McKinley from 1897 to 1899. As his wife was often ill and indisposed, his daughter frequently accompanied him to official events in Washington, D.C., during this time.

At receptions at the home of her parents, artistically inclined Lillie P. Bliss met actors like Walter Hampden, Ruth Draper and Ethel Barrymore. In her youth, her main artistic interests were of both classical and contemporary music. In her thirties, she began to promote financially young pianists and opera singers. She also supported the string quartet led by Franz Kneisel (1885–1917) (Kneisel Quartet) and promoted the Juilliard Foundation devoted to musical training. Among her friends were the music critic Richard Aldrich and the musician Charles Martin Loeffler.

One of her earliest encounters with modern art were exhibition visits at the Union League Club of New York. Her father was a member of this club and its president from 1902 to 1906. The club exhibited regularly works of living artists. For example, thirty-four paintings by Claude Monet were shown there in 1891. After her father's death in 1911, Bliss, who never married, lived with her mother in an apartment on 37th Street in Manhattan.

== Building the art collection ==
One of her earliest purchases of art works was a painting by American painter Arthur B. Davies. She met the artist in his studio and visited art exhibitions with him and the art teacher Mary Quinn Sullivan. In subsequent years, Bliss built the largest private collection of works by Davies in the United States.

Her friend, physician Christian Archibald Herter, accompanied her piano playing occasionally as a recreational cellist. Through him she met his sister-in-law, the painter Adele Herter who founded the Women's Cosmopolitan Club in New York City together with Abby Aldrich Rockefeller and five other women in March 1911. Lillie P. Bliss joined this union a few months later. She became a lifelong friend of Abby Aldrich Rockefeller. Their common interests later led to the founding of the Museum of Modern Art. In the same year, the Association of American Painters and Sculptors was constituted; among its co-founders were Arthur B. Davies, the artist Walt Kuhn and the critic Walter Pach.

Over the years, Bliss acquired numerous paintings by Kuhn and all three played a significant role in the preparation of the Armory Show in 1913, whose aim was to bring the latest trends in art before the American public. Other venues, such as the conservative dominated National Academy of Design, at this time refused to support current artistic trends.

Six weeks before the Armory Show, Bliss acquired two landscapes by Pierre-Auguste Renoir and Edgar Degas a painting and a pastel, at the New York branch of the gallery Durand Ruel. She lent these works to the Armory Show and also helped with funds to enable the exhibition. From the exhibition, she bought a large number of works of art, including Silence and Roger and Angelica by Odilon Redon. From personal encounters with artists in the exhibition, she developed some long-lasting friendships. This was the case with artists like Charles Sheeler, Charles and Maurice Prendergast, whose works she bought as well.

Works by Paul Cézanne form one focal point of her collection. Bliss acquired her first Cézanne (The Street, 1875) soon after the closure of the Armory Show from the collection of her friend Arthur B. Davies. Unaffected by negative reviews, Bliss acquired the painting Fruits and Wine and eight watercolors by Cézanne from the exhibition compiled by Félix Fénéon at the Montross Gallery in New York in 1916.

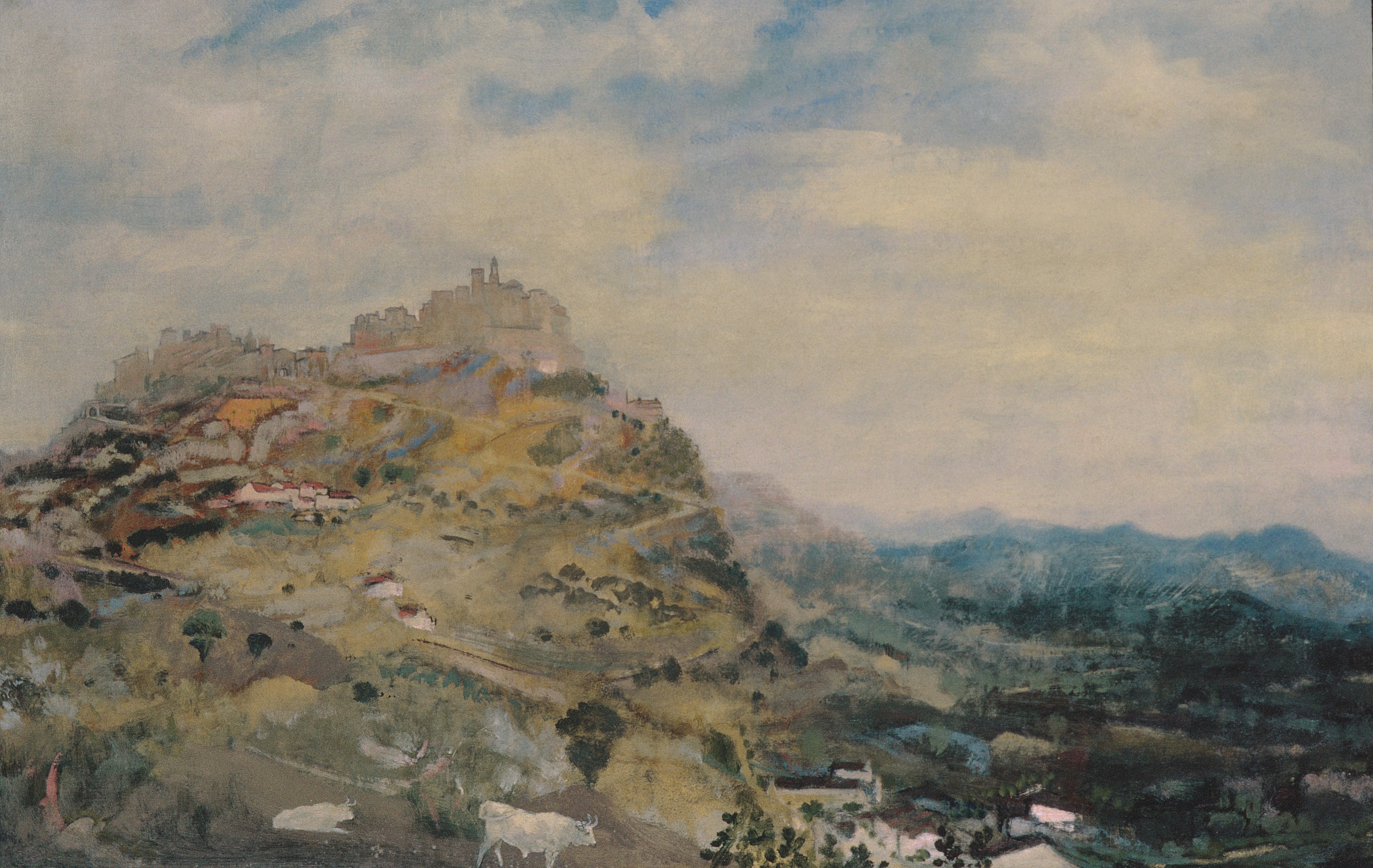
Arthur B. Davies:
Italian Hill Town, ca. 1925,
donation to the Metropolitan Museum of Art. Oil on canvas, 65.7 × 101.3 cm

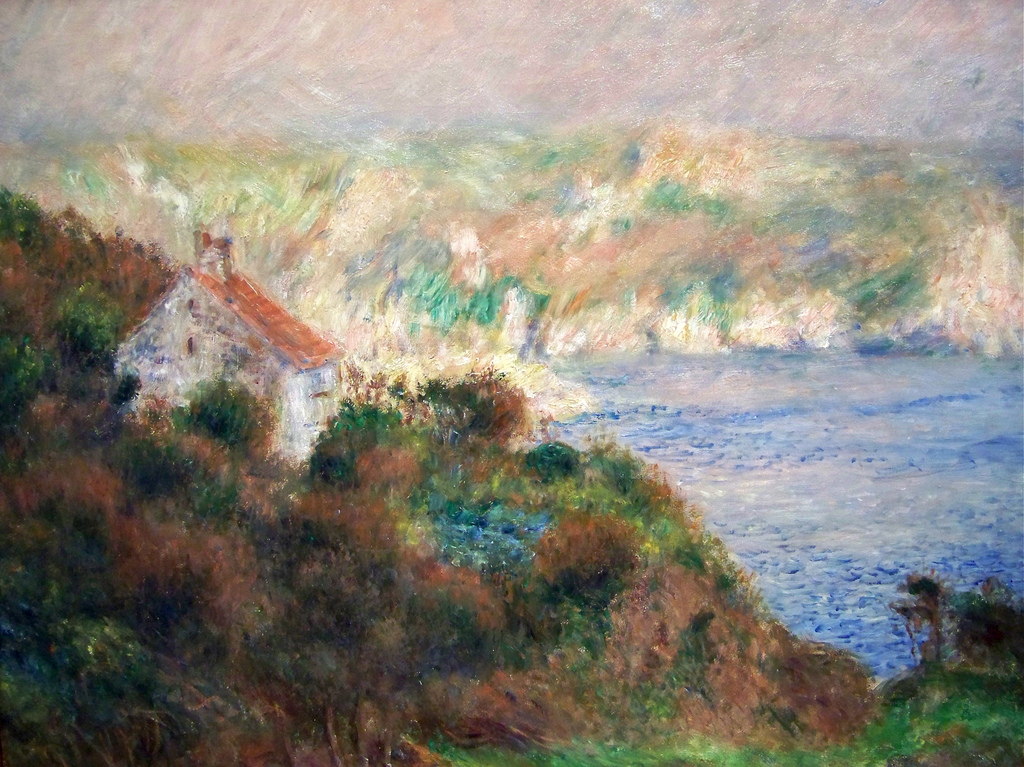
Pierre-Auguste Renoir:
Brouillard à Guernsey, 1883,
today Cincinnati Art Museum. Oil on canvas, 54 × 65 cm

Paul Gauguin:
Hina Te Fatu, 1893,
donation to the Museum of Modern Art. Oil on burlap, 114.3 × 62.6 cm (45.00 × 24.65 in)

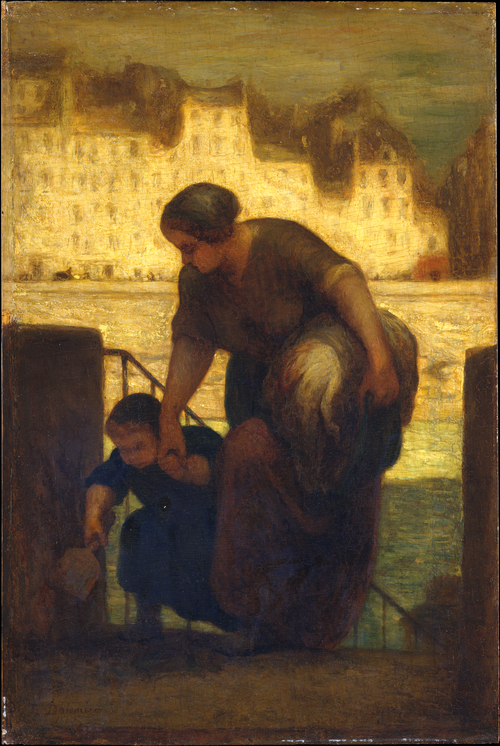
Honoré Daumier:
The Laundress, ca. 1863,
today Metropolitan Museum of Art. Oil on wood, 48.9 × 33 cm

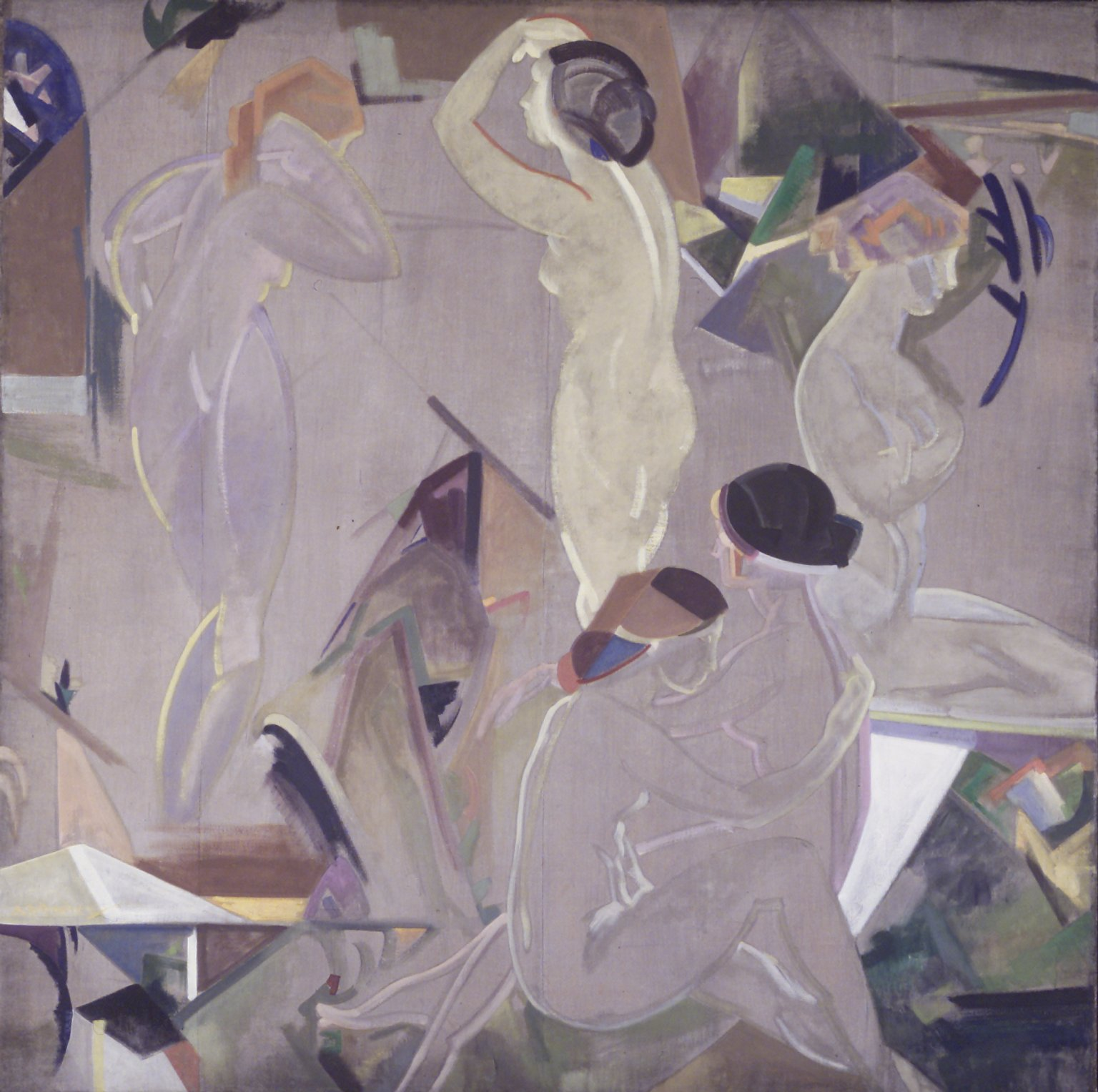
Arthur B. Davies, The Dawning, 1915. Donated to the Brooklyn Museum

Together with her friends, art collectors Louisine Havemeyer and John Quinn, she persuaded the curator of painting, Bryson Burroughs, to host the Loan Exhibition of Impressionist and Post-Impressionist Art in the Metropolitan Museum of Art in 1921. Quinn lent 26, Bliss twelve (including five Cézannes and her Degas painting) and Havemeyer two works (both women were anonymous). The press complained about Quinn as a secret leader of this issue, criticized the self-appointed citizens committee and described the exhibition as "dangerous". The painting Quinn Hina Te Fatou (The Moon and the Earth) by Paul Gauguin from his collection was described by the newspaper New York World as typical for the odious Bolshevik work which were on display in the exhibition. Undeterred by such criticism, a little later Bliss acquired this painting for her collection.

From 1924 to 1929, Bliss traveled to Europe once per year to discuss the latest artistic developments - especially in France. Purchases for her collection, however, were made almost invariably at New York art dealers or the New York branch of European galleries. In these years, in addition to current paintings, she bought some older works of art as well. For example, in 1927 she bought a work by the Post-Impressionist Georges Seurat (Port-en-Bessin, Harbor Entrance) and a work of the realist Honoré Daumier (The Laundress).

== The foundation of the Museum of Modern Art ==
After the death of Arthur B. Davies in October 1928, several exhibitions were held to preserve his memory; Bliss borrowed many works of art for them. In the auction of his art collection, Bliss and Abby Aldrich Rockefeller were among the buyers and both developed a plan to form an institution devoted to organize exhibitions of modern art in New York. The steadfast refusal of the Metropolitan Museum of Art to exhibit art of the late 19th century and works by contemporary artists played a decisive role.

In late May 1929, Abby Aldrich Rockefeller invited Bliss and Mary Quinn Sullivan for lunch in order to discuss the establishment of a museum of modern art. Another invited guest was art collector A. Conger Goodyear, who had previously served as a board member of the Albright Art Gallery in Buffalo, and who also participated in the meeting. Goodyear agreed to chair this circle as president, Bliss became his deputy and Rockefeller was given the role of treasurer. A short time later they were joined by art historian and collector Paul J. Sachs, a friend of Rockefeller, publisher Frank Crowninshield, a friend of Bliss, and Josephine Porter Boardman, a friend both to Bliss and Rockefeller, who hosted a literary salon in New York. On November 7, the first exhibition of the Museum of Modern Art opened in rented spaces in the Heckscher Building at 730 Fifth Avenue at the corner of Fifth Avenue and 57th Street in Manhattan. Bliss contributed some paintings from her collection to the first exhibition, entitled Cézanne, Gauguin, Seurat, Van Gogh.

== Last years and legacy ==
Although Bliss was weakened by cancer the last months of her life, she participated actively in the formation of the Museum of Modern Art until shortly before her death. For example, March 2, 1931, she visited the exhibition Toulouse-Lautrec/Redon to which she had contributed three works by Odilon Redon and her paintings of Toulouse-Lautrec. On March 12, 1931, Bliss died in New York and was buried in Woodlawn Cemetery in the Bronx. Two months after her death, the Museum of Modern Art presented as its 12th exhibition Works by 24 Artists from the Collection of Lillie P. Bliss, in memory of the Museum co-founder.

In her will, Bliss endowed charities like New York Hospital and the New York Association for Improving the Conditions of the Poor with financial contributions. She bequeathed part of her art collection to the Metropolitan Museum of Art, including works by Arthur B. Davies and Claude Monet's painting The Rocky Cliffs at Étretat.

To the surprise of her friends from the Museum of Modern Art, she donated most of her art collection, 150 works of art, to that institution. The museum, at first thought of only for exhibition purposes, was thus given the foundation of a proper permanent collection. The conditions attached to this legacy in the will included a "secure financial basis" to be provided by the museum within three years. Meeting this condition would permanently secure the collection.

One stipulation in her will proved to be proactive and helpful for the future museum collection: her collection of works of art could be sold or exchanged for other works of art. Only three pictures, the two Cézanne paintings Still Life with Apples and Still Life with Ginger Container, Sugar and Oranges and the Laundress by Daumier were excluded from this stipulation. These works could never be sold, only given to the Metropolitan Museum if not suitable for the Museum of Modern Art. The two Cézanne paintings are still in the Museum of Modern Art, the Daumier painting was transferred to the collection of the Metropolitan Museum in 1947.

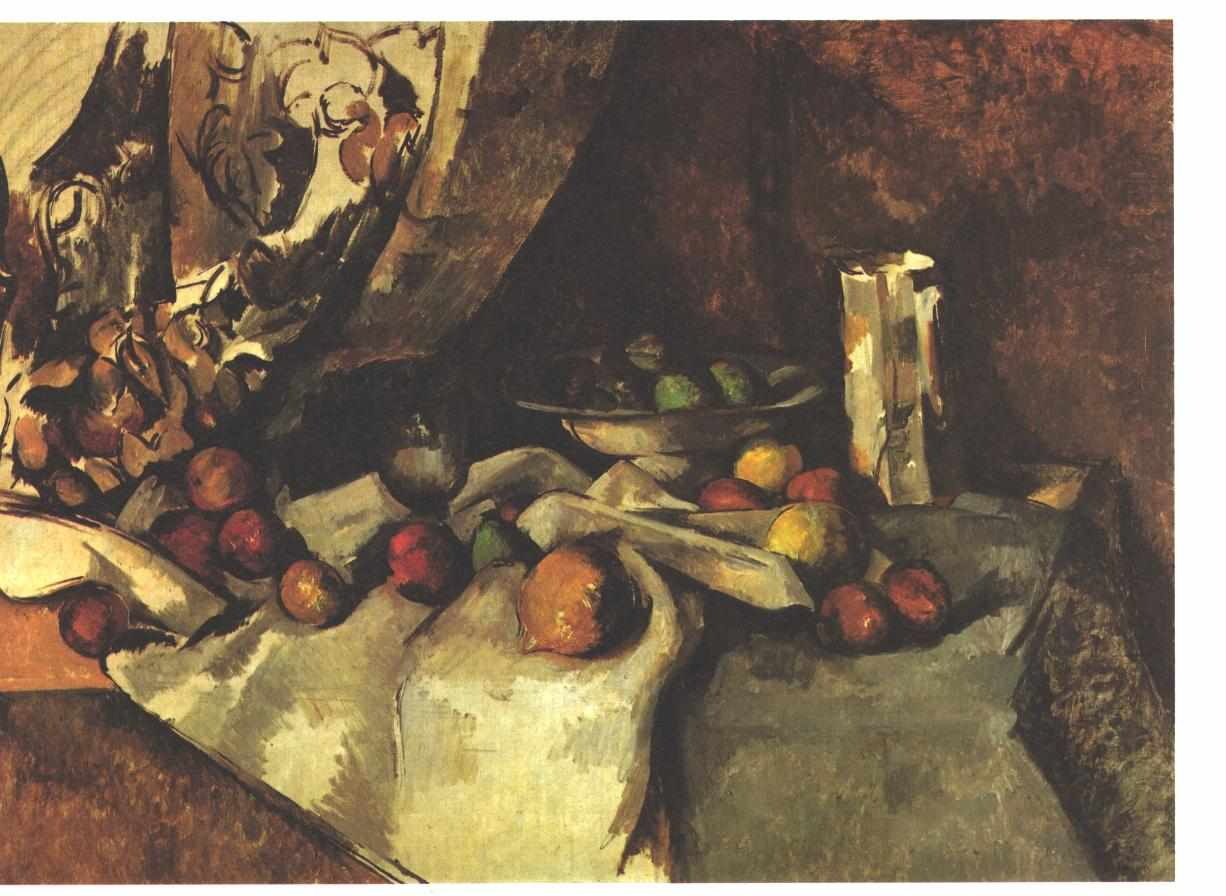
Paul Cézanne:
Still life with apples, 1895–1898, donation to the Museum of Modern Art. Oil on canvas, 27 × 36 1/2" (68.6 × 92.7 cm).

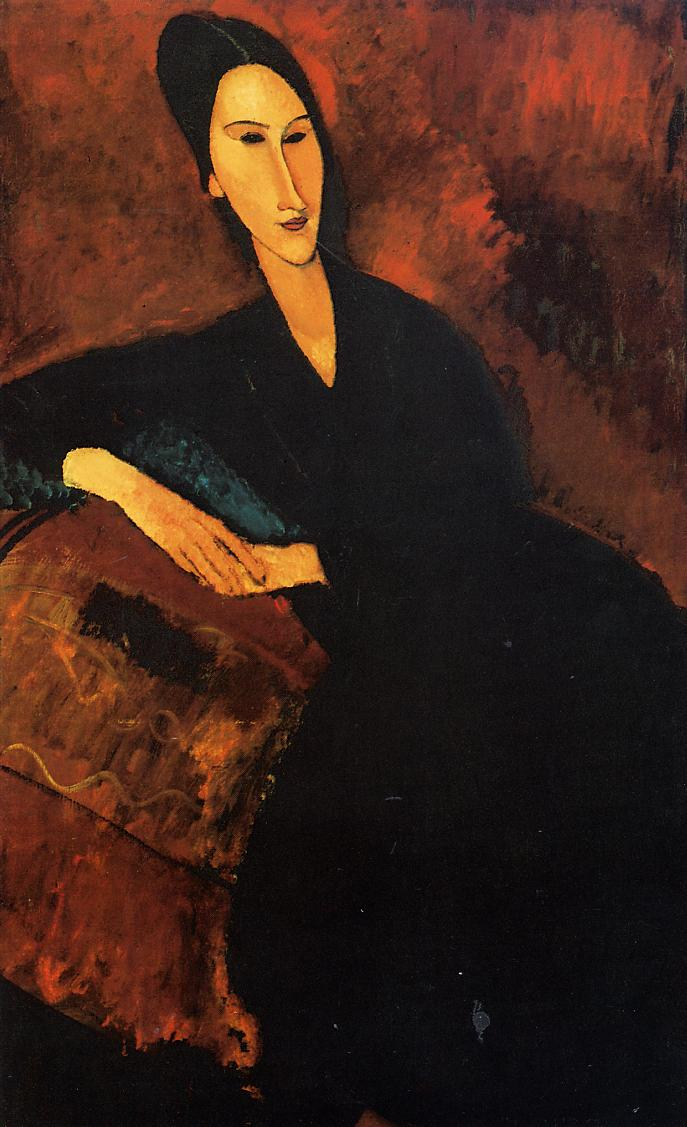
Amedeo Modigliani:
Portrait Anna Zborowska, 1917, donation to the Museum of Modern Art. Oil on canvas, 51 1/4 × 32" (130.2 × 81.3 cm).

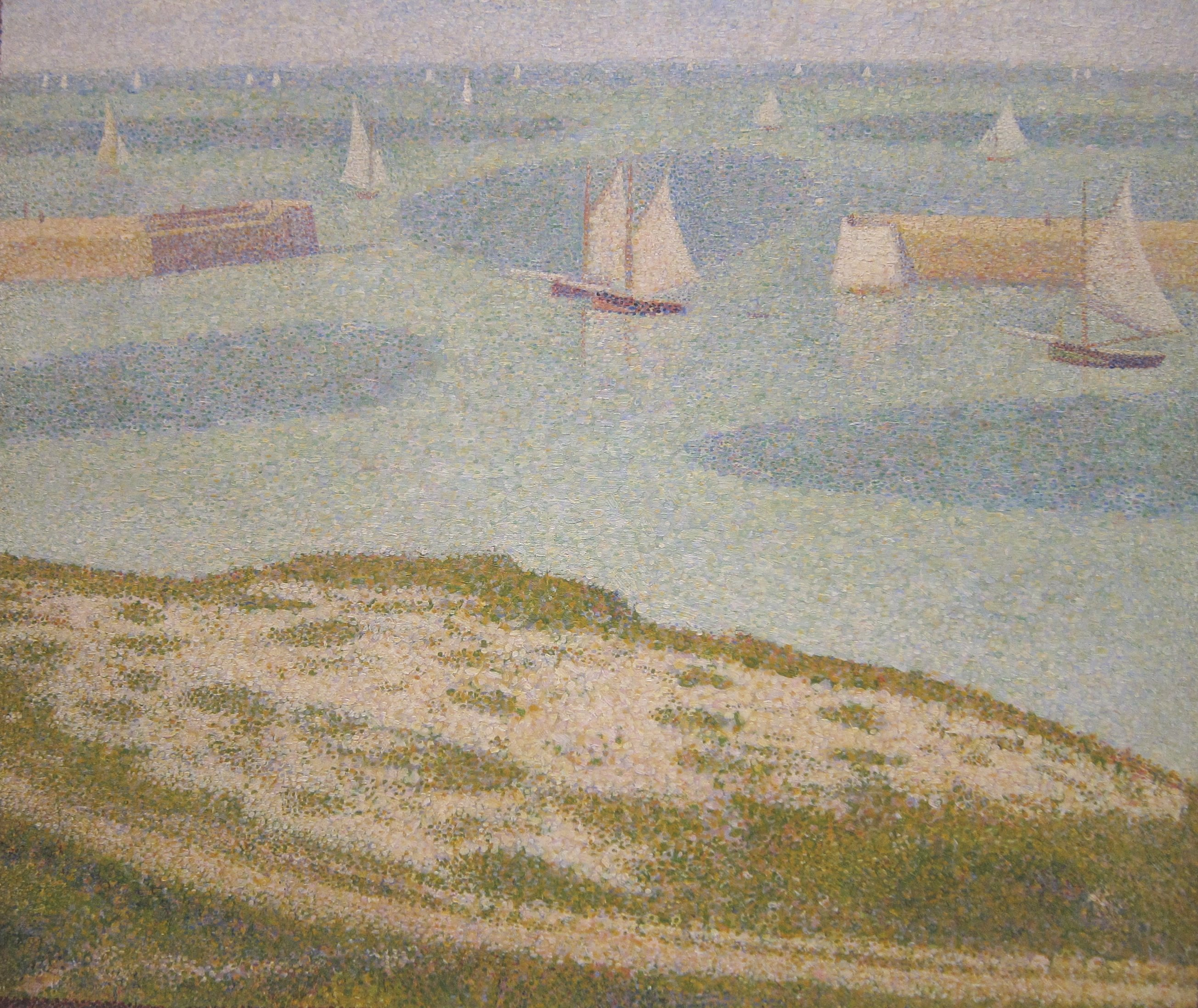
Georges Seurat:
Port-en-Bessin, Entrance to the Harbor, 1888, donation to the Museum of Modern Art. Oil on canvas, 21 5/8 × 25 5/8" (54.9 × 65.1 cm)

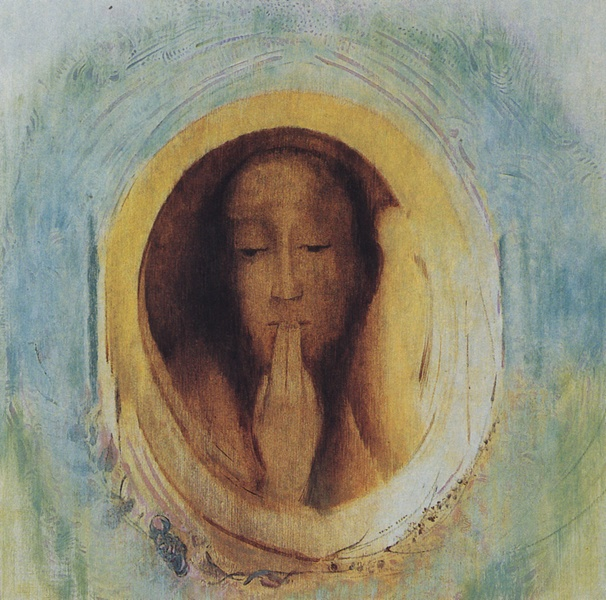
Odilon Redon:
Silence, 1911, donation to the Museum of Modern Art. Oil on prepared paper, 21 1/2 × 21 1/4" (54.6 × 54 cm)

Among the most important works from the Bliss collection in the Museum of Modern Art today are Cézanne's The Bathers and his still-life painting, Portrait of Anna Zborowska by Amedeo Modigliani, Still Life in Green by Pablo Picasso, Hina Te Fatou by Paul Gauguin, Port-en-Bessin, Harbor Entrance by Georges Seurat, Interior with Violin Case by Henri Matisse and Silence and Roger and Angelica by Odilon Redon.

The first director of the Museum of Modern Art, Alfred H. Barr, characterized the importance of this collection saying: "With the Bliss Collection, New York can now look London, Paris, Berlin, Munich, Moscow and Chicago in the face so far as public collections of modern art are concerned. Without it we would still have had to hang our heads as a backward community."

== The Lillie P. Bliss Bequest ==
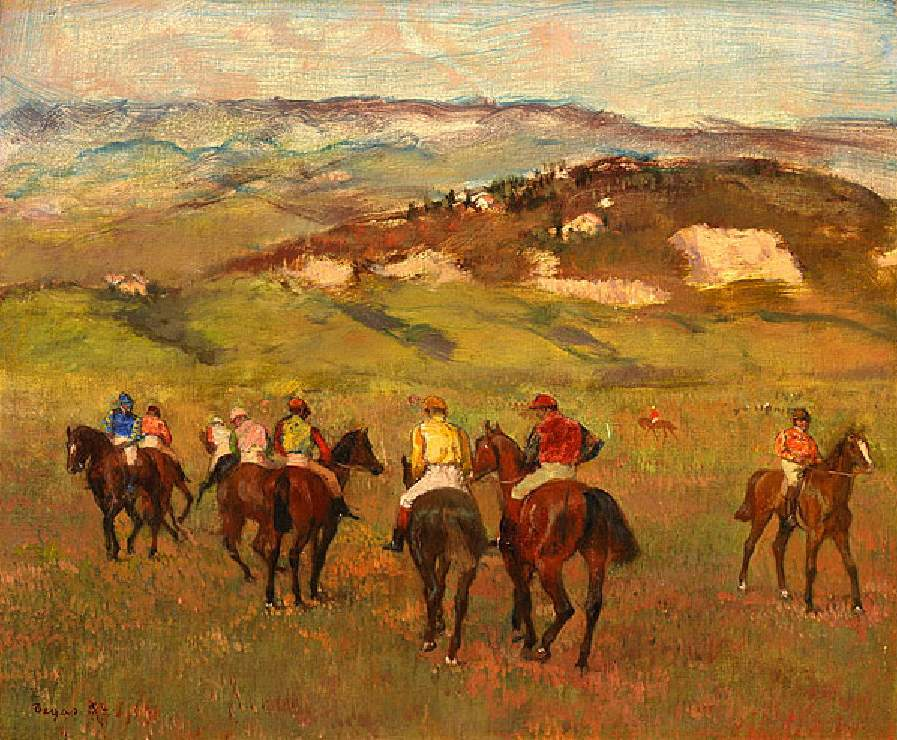
Edgar Degas: Jockeys on Horseback before Distant Hills, 1884, today Detroit Institute of Arts. Oil on canvas, 17 11/16 × 21 5/8 in. (44.9 × 54.9 cm)

Vincent van Gogh: The Starry Night, 1889, Museum of Modern Art. Saint Rémy. Oil on canvas, 29 × 36 1/4" (73.7 × 92.1 cm). Acquired through the Lillie P. Bliss Bequest

The vaguely defined "secure financial basis" in Bliss's will, a sort of endowment to maintain and expand the collection, led to protracted negotiations between Bliss's brother Cornelius Newton Bliss, the executor of her will, and the board of the Museum of Modern Art. The basis for the endowment sum would be the value of the collection donated to the museum. An expert opinion of the New York gallery Ferargil valued the collection at $1,139,036.00, with Cézanne's three works The Bathers, Still Life with Apples and Pine and Rocks at $150,000 and Degas's Rider before Hills being valued at $40,000. Following this estimate, Bliss and the Museum Board initially agreed to raising a sum of $1,000,000.

Due to the Great Depression at the beginning of the 1930s, raising that sum proved to be extremely difficult. The Museum of Modern Art managed to negotiate the amount down to $750,000 initially and eventually to $600,000. This amount could be raised by a few large donations. Abby Aldrich Rockefeller contributed $200,000; her son Nelson A. Rockefeller and the Carnegie Foundation each donated $100,000. In March 1934, the amount agreed upon was available and the Bliss collection, which included works by Paul Cézanne, Edgar Degas, Andre Derain, Henri Mattisse, Amedeo Mogdigliani, Pablo Picasso, André Dunoyer de Segonzac, among others, was legally transferred to the museum. It forms the basis of the museum collection, and the money raised has served to expand the collection since then as the Lillie P. Bliss Bequest.

As allowed by her will, the museum sold off the Bliss art collection pieces one by one. For example, Degas's Jockeys on Horseback before Distant Hills was sold in the late 1930s for $18,000, in order to purchase Picasso's Les Demoiselles d'Avignon with the proceeds and an additional $10,000. By the sale of three other works from the Bliss collection, Vincent van Gogh's The Starry Night was bought in 1941.

In 1951, three more works from the Bliss collection were sold to the Metropolitan Museum: Odilon Redon's Etruscan Vase with Flowers, Paul Cézanne's Portrait of Antoine Dominique Sauveur Aubert and Pablo Picasso's Woman in White. Henri Rousseau's Lion in the Jungle and Camille Pissarro's Riverside (both now in private collections) and Henri de Toulouse-Lautrec's May Belfort (now Cleveland Museum of Art) and Pierre-Auguste Renoir's Brouillard à Guernsey (now Cincinnati Art Museum) were sold as well.

In turn, the Museum of Modern Art acquired through the Lillie P. Bliss Bequest paintings by Henri Matisse, André Derain, Georges Braque, Amedeo Modigliani, Alexej von Jawlensky, Alberto Giacometti, Balthus, Alexander Archipenko, Juan Gris, Pablo Picasso, Fernand Léger, Theo van Doesburg, Marc Chagall, Piet Mondrian, Lyonel Feininger, Arshile Gorky, as well as sculptures by Umberto Boccioni, Henri Matisse, Henry Moore, Constantin Brâncuși, Joseph Cornell, and numerous other works of art.

In addition to the Lillie P. Bliss Bequest, the Lillie P. Bliss International Study Center commemorates museum's co-founder. This study center of historical research in the field of modern art is located at the Museum of Modern Art.

== Literature ==
- Barr, Jr., Alfred. The Lillie P. Bliss Collection. New York: Plantin Press, 1934.
- Brown, Milton. The Story of the Armory Show. New York: Abbeville Press, 1988, ISBN 0-89659-795-4
- James, Edward T., Janet Wilson James and Paul Boyer (ed.): Notable American Women, 1607–1950: A Biographical Dictionary. Cambridge: Belknap Press of Harvard University Press, 1971, ISBN 0-674-62734-2.
- Kantor, Sybil Gordon. Alfred H. Barr, Jr. and the Intellectual Origins of the Museum of Modern Art. Cambridge: MIT Press, 2003.
- Roob, Rona. "A Noble Legacy." Art in America, (November 2003) Vol. 91, No. 11, p. 73–83.
- Walsh, Irene M. Lillie P. Bliss: Collector, Advocate, and Visionary Benefactor of the Museum of Modern Art. Bloomsbury Visual Arts, 2025, ISBN 978-13504-5974-8.
