= Frank Rinehart =

American photographer (1861–1928)

- Born: February 12, 1861; Lodi, Illinois, U.S.
- Died: December 17, 1928 (aged 67)
- Education: William Henry Jackson
- Known for: Photography

Frank Albert Rinehart (February 12, 1861 – December 17, 1928) was an American photographer who captured Native American personalities and scenes, especially portrait settings of leaders and members of the delegations who attended the 1898 Indian Congress in Omaha.

== Biography ==
German American Rinehart was born in Lodi (now Maple Park), Illinois. He and his brother, Alfred, moved to Colorado in the 1870s and found employment at the Charles Bohm photography studio, in Denver. In 1881 the Rinehart brothers formed a partnership with Western photographer William Henry Jackson, who had achieved widespread fame for his images of the West. Under Jackson's teachings, Rinehart's perfected his professional skills, and developed a keen interest in Native American culture. Frank Rinehart and Anna, the receptionist of Jackson's studio, married and in 1885 moved to Nebraska. In downtown Omaha, Rinehart opened a studio in the Brandeis Building, where he worked until his death.

Rinehart married Anna Ransom Johnson (daughter of Willard Bemis Johnson and Phebe Jane Carpenter) on September 5, 1885, in Denver County, Colorado. They had two daughters, Ruth and Helen, both born in Nebraska.

In 1898, and in occasion of the Indian Congress held in conjunction with the Trans-Mississippi and International Exposition, Rinehart was commissioned to photograph the event and the Native American personalities who attended it. Together with his assistant Adolph Muhr (who would later be employed by the photographer Edward S. Curtis), they produced what is now considered "one of the best photographic documentations of Indian leaders at the turn of the century". Tom Southall, former photograph curator at the University of Kansas' Spencer Art Museum, said of the Rinehart collection:

The dramatic beauty of these portraits is especially impressive as a departure from earlier, less sensitive photographs of Native Americans. Instead of being detached, ethnographic records, the Rinehart photographs are portraits of individuals with an emphasis on strength of expression. While Rinehart and Muhr were not the first photographers to portray Indian subjects with such dignity, this large body of work which was widely seen and distributed may have had an important influence in changing subsequent portrayals of Native Americans.

Rinehart and Muhr photographed American Indians at the Indian Congress in a studio on the Exposition grounds with an 8 x 10 glass-negative camera with a German lens. Platinum prints were produced to achieve the broad range of tonal values that medium afforded.

After the Indian Congress, Rinehart and Muhr travelled the Indian reservations for two years, portraying Native American leaders who had not attended the event, as well as depicting general aspects of the indigenous everyday life and culture.

The collection of Rinehart Indian Photographs is currently preserved at Haskell Indian Nations University. Since 1994, the collection has been organized, preserved, copied, and cataloged in a computer database, funded by the Bureau of Indian Affairs and the Hallmark Foundation. It includes images from the 1898 Exposition, the 1899 Greater America Exposition, studio portraits from 1900, and photographs by Rinehart taken at the Crow Agency in Montana also in 1900.

== Gallery ==
Chief Little Wound, Ogalalla Sioux, (c) 1899. Photographs of the American West, Frank A. Rinehart Photographs, Boston Public Library

Sarah Whislter, Sauk and Fox woman.

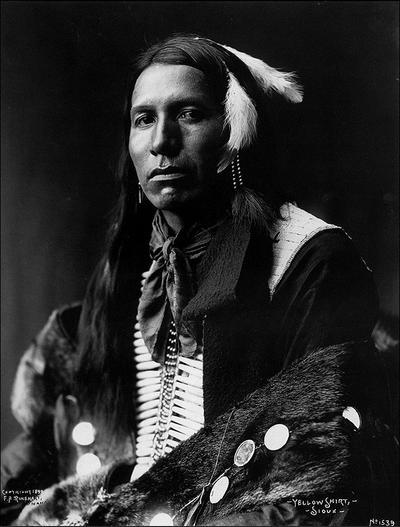
Yellow Shirt, Hunkpapa Sioux chief.

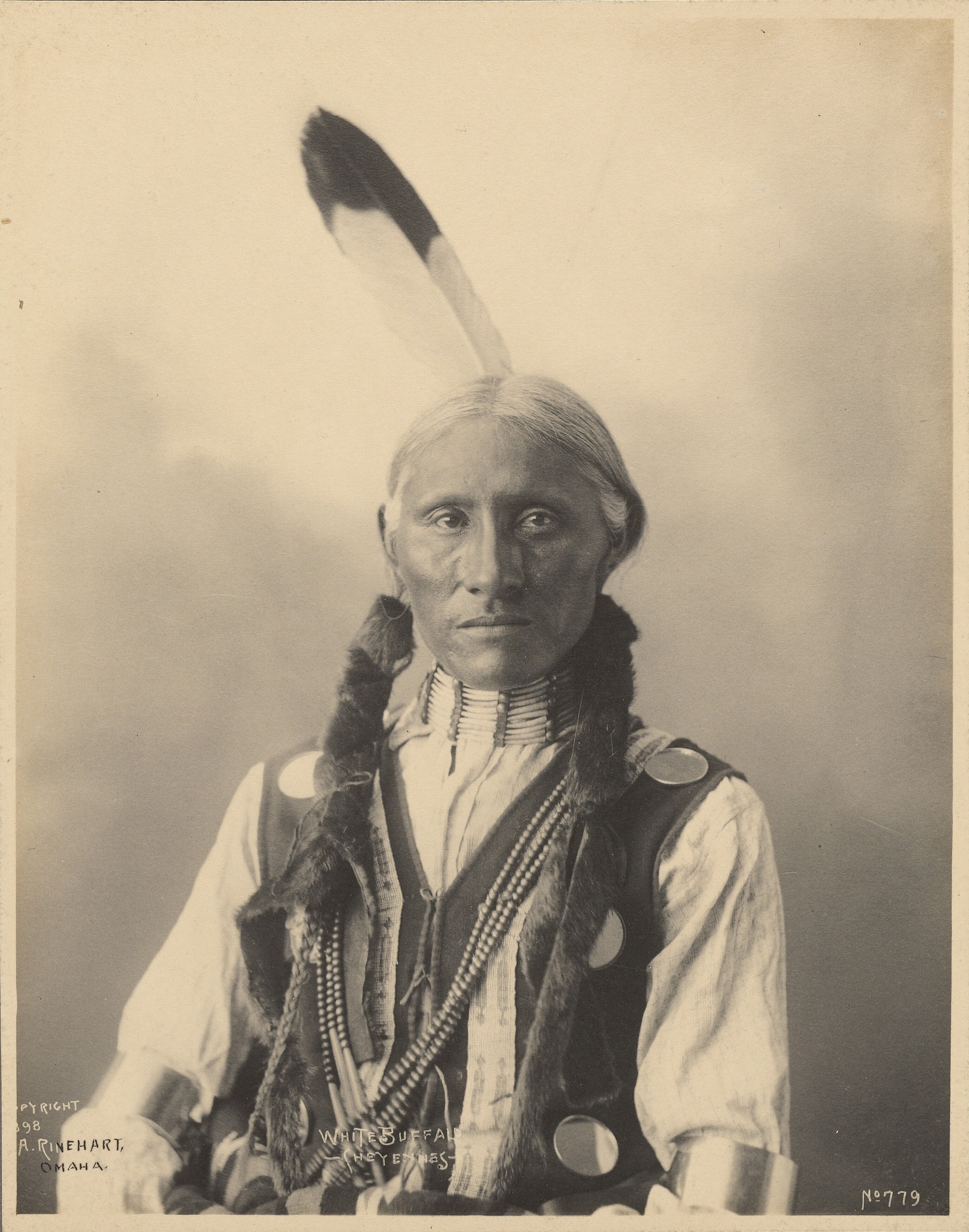
White Buffalo, Cheyenne chief.

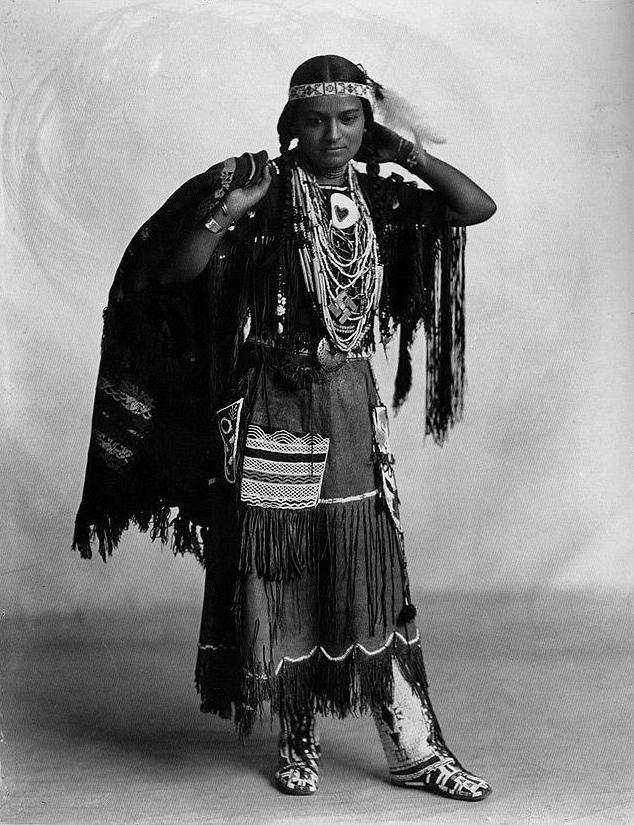
Wah-Ta-Waso, Iroquois woman.

Kicking Horse, Flathead Salish chief.

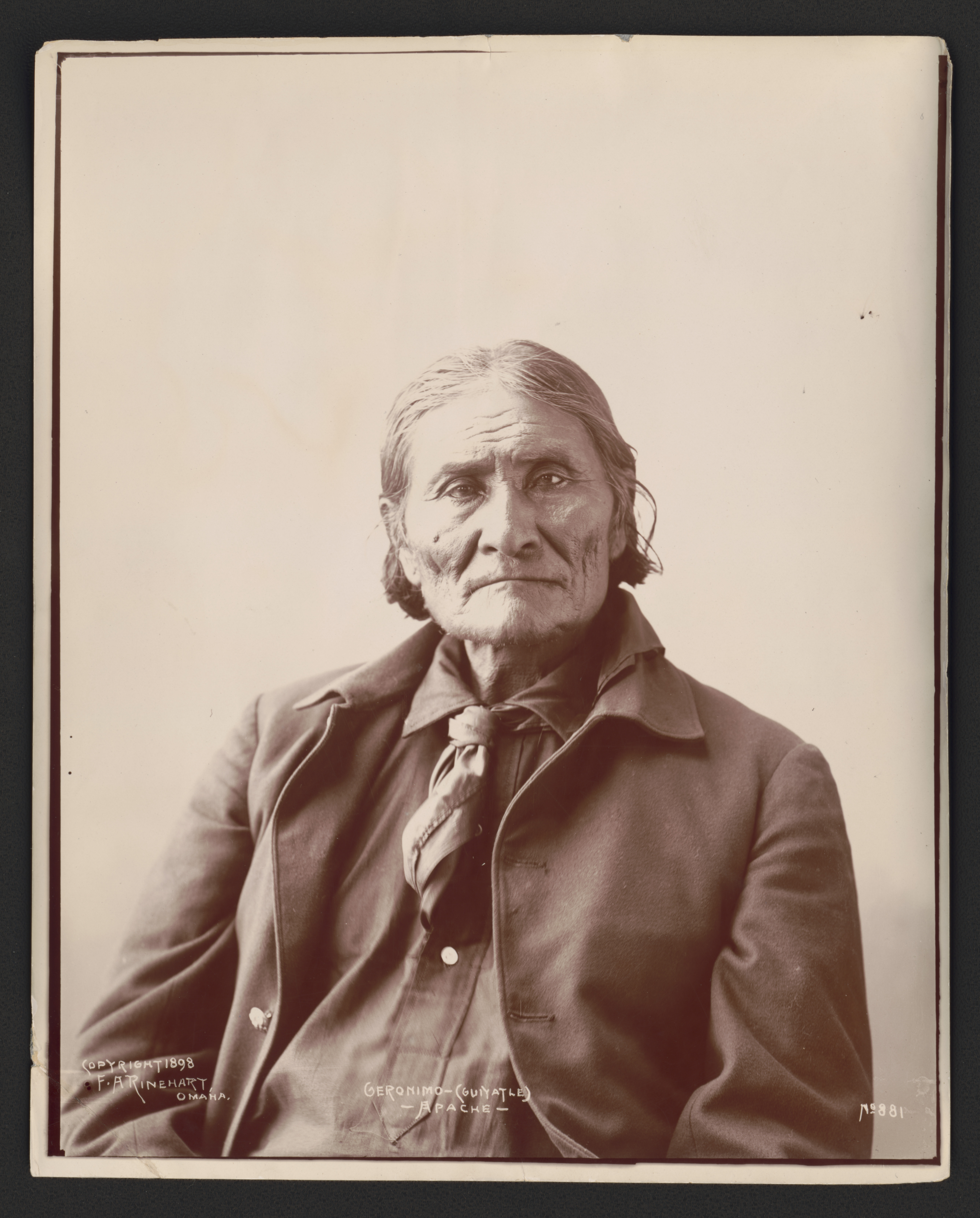
Geronimo, Chiricahua Apache leader.

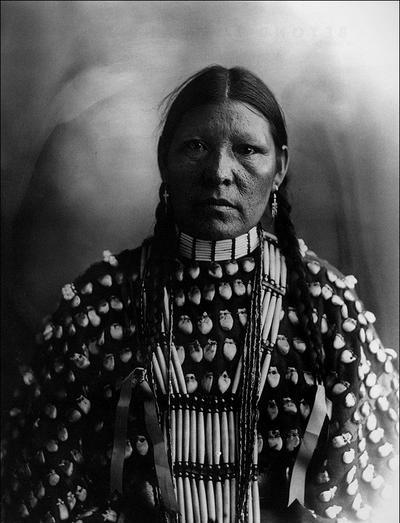
Freckle Face, Arapahoe woman.

Bonie Tela, San Carlos Apache; and Hattie Tom, Chiricahua Apache.

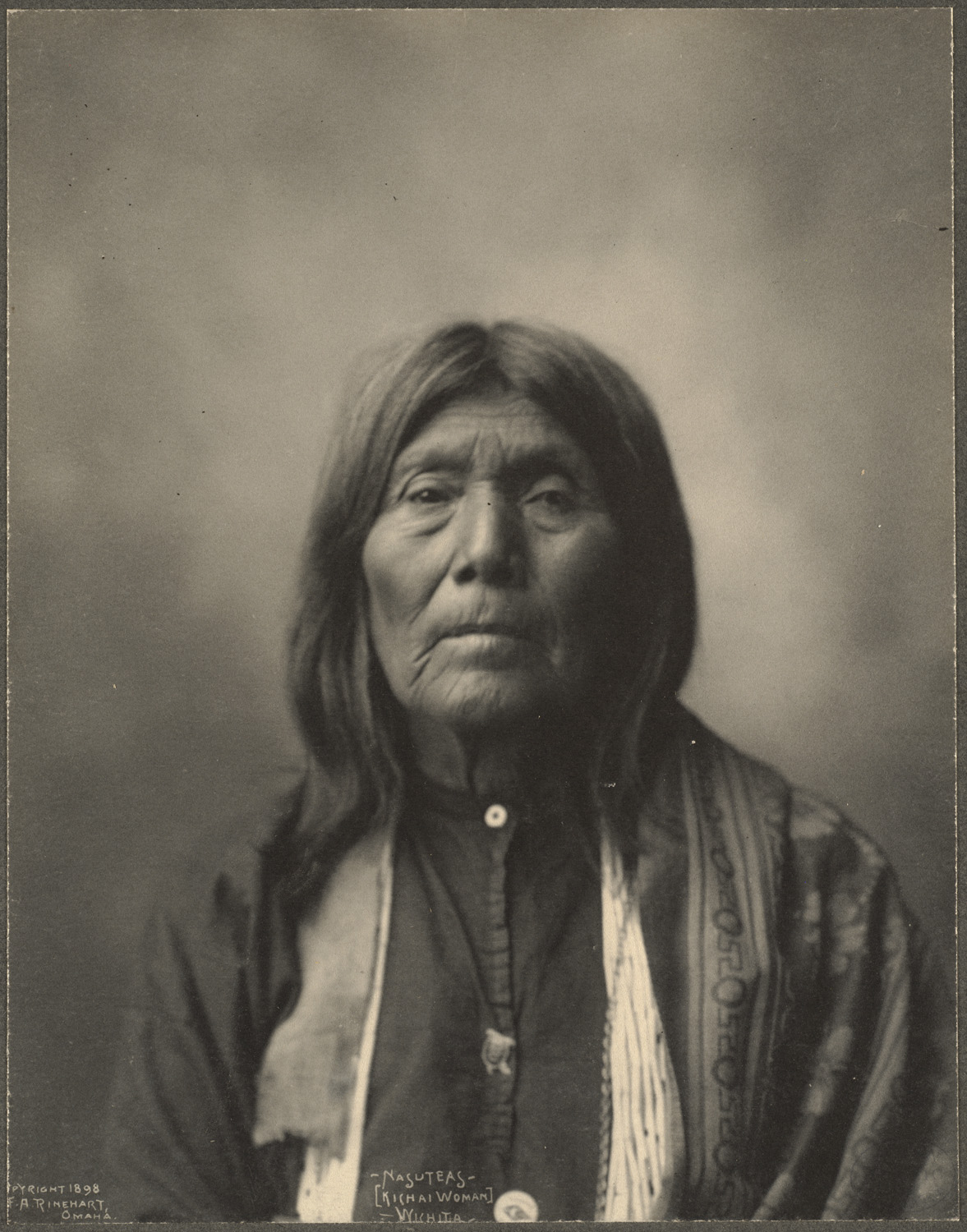
Nasuteas (Kichai Woman), Wichita

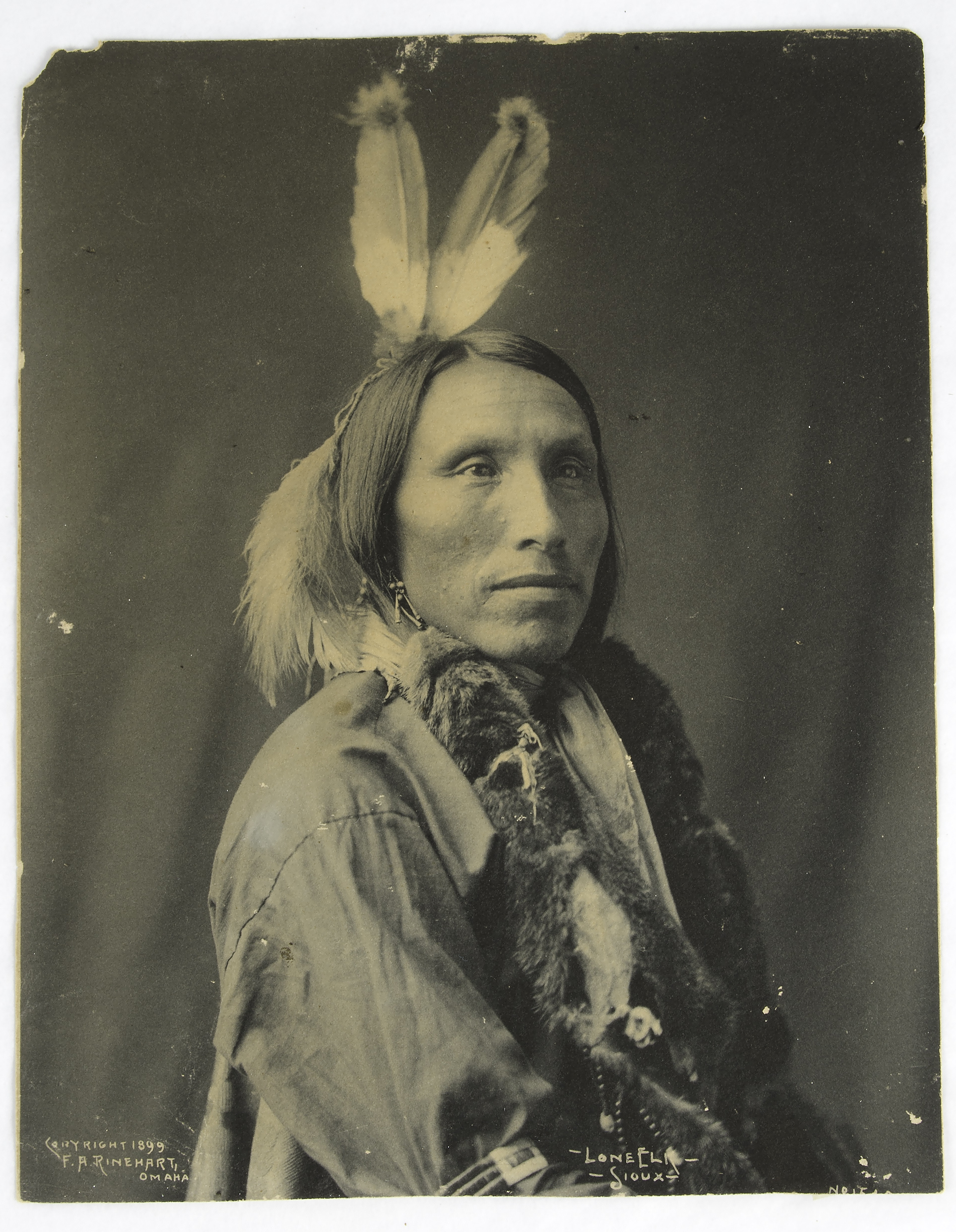
Lone Elk by Frank Rinehart, 1899
