= Anthony A. Bliss =

American lawyer and arts executive (1913–1991)

Anthony Addison Bliss (April 19, 1913 – August 10, 1991) was an American music administrator and lawyer. He was the head administrator of the Metropolitan Opera for 11 years; serving first as executive director from 1974 to 1981, and then general manager from 1981 to 1985.

== Early life and education ==
The son of Cornelius Newton Bliss Jr., Anthony Addison Bliss was born on April 19, 1913 in New York City. His father was a banker and philanthropist. In his youth he was educated at the Groton School in Massachusetts. He graduated from Harvard University with a Bachelor of Arts in 1936, and then pursued graduate studies at Columbia University from 1936 to 1938. In 1940 he graduated from the University of Virginia School of Law with a law degree.

== War service and career ==
During World War II, Bliss served in the South Pacific as a lieutenant commander in the United States Navy Reserve. After this, he practiced law in New York City as a member of the firm of Milbank, Tweed, Hadley & McCloy. His father, Corneliusm served on the board of the Metropolitan Opera ("the Met") from 1932 until his death in 1949, at which point Anthony took his place on the board.

Bliss became president of the Met's board in 1956, at which time he was the youngest member of the board by 14 years. He served in that role until 1967, during which time he played an instrumental role in overseeing the Met's move from the old Metropolitan Opera House on 39th st to the then new Metropolitan Opera House at Lincoln Center. He also was the creative force behind establishing the Metropolitan Opera National Company; a second touring company of the Met that featured young artists in their early stages of career development.

In 1974 Bliss succeeded Rudolph Bing as the executive director and head administrator of the Metropolitan Opera. At this time he left his law practice, and began the difficult task of taking over an organization which was then in a financial crises. He was successful at improving the Met's finances in his ten years as leader of the Met; a period which also coincided with a raising of artistic standards under music director James Levine. He was responsible for creating the Met's media and marketing departments, and was responsible for modernizing the company's approach to fund raising as well as increasing its endowment.

The improvements Bliss brought to the Met ultimately allowed the company to expand the length of its season. He played a role in the establishment of the television series Live from the Metropolitan Opera which began in 1977. In 1981 his job title (but not his responsibilities) was changed to General Manager. He remained in this role until his retirement in 1985.

Bliss was for serveral year vice president of the The Boys' Club of New York. He was also a board member of several other arts organizations; serving terms on the boards of the Joffrey Ballet, the American Arts Alliance, Lincoln Center, and the New York Foundation for the Arts. President Lyndon B. Johnson appointed him to the National Council on the Arts when it was founded in 1965.

== Personal life and death ==
Bliss was married three times. He married Barbara Field in 1937. Their marriage ended in divorce in 1941. In 1942 he married Jo Ann Sayers. Their marriage ended in divorce in 1967. His final marriage to ballet dancer Sally Brayley in 1967 lasted until his death.

Anthony Addison Bliss died in Charlottetown, Prince Edward Island on August 10, 1991. He died from pneumonia and a brain hemorrhage at Queen Elizabeth Hospital
