= White Buffalo (Cheyenne leader) =

Northern Cheyenne Chief

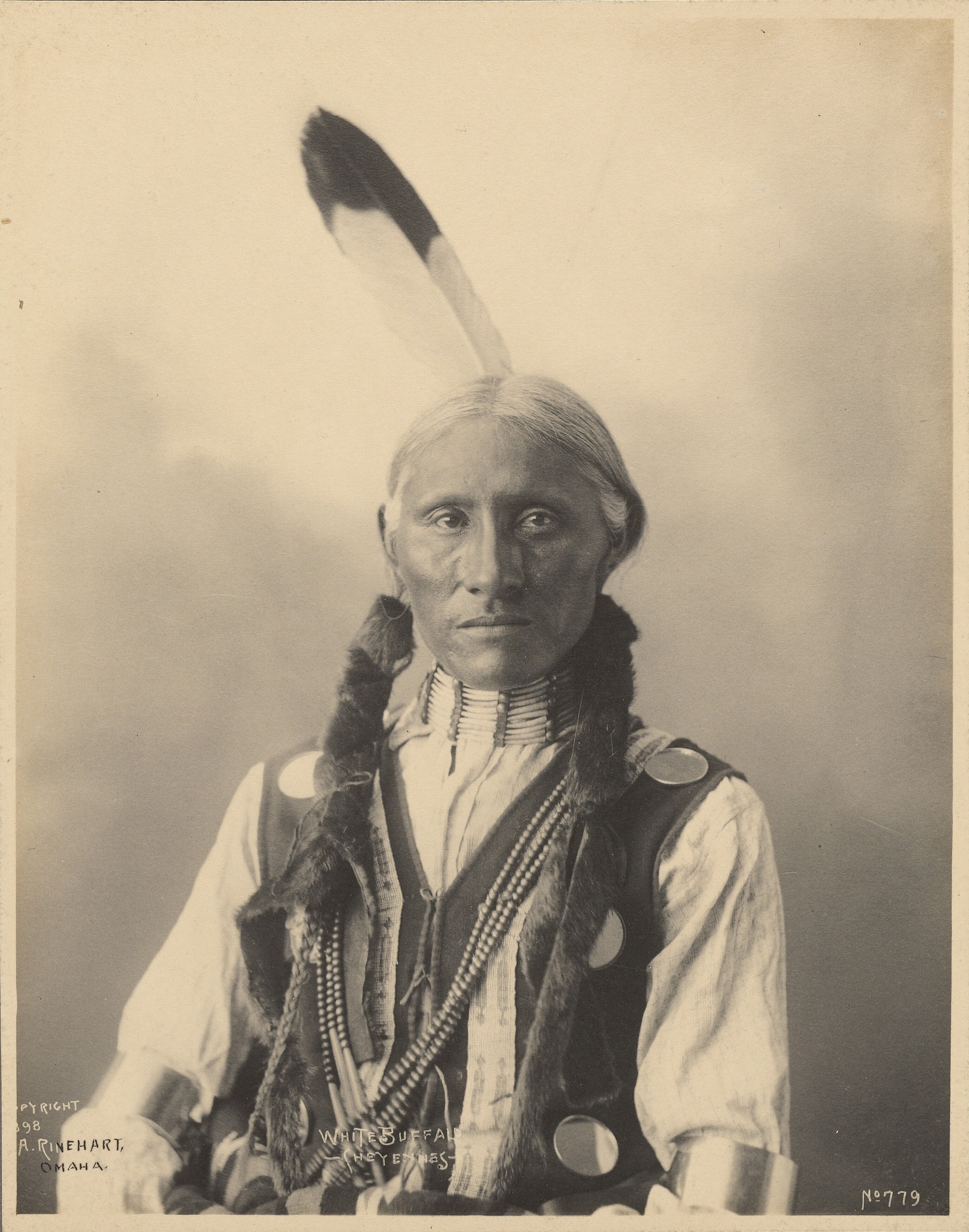
White Buffalo in 1898

White Buffalo (Cheyenne: Hotóá'e Ȯhvó'komaestse; c. 1862- June 1929) was a chief of the Northern Cheyenne. He was born in Montana Territory to the Northern Cheyenne tribe but was forced with most of his tribe to remove to Indian Territory (now the State of Oklahoma). He lived most of his life on the Cheyenne and Arapaho Reservation in Indian Territory and then Oklahoma. He graduated in 1884 as one of the early attendees of Carlisle Indian Industrial School, in Carlisle, Pennsylvania, one of 249 students from his tribe to attend that school over the years of its operation.

He returned to the Darlington Agency in Oklahoma after his schooling, and during his twenties, he was an Indian scout in the detachment of scouts headed by Edward W Casey. When he was 40, he was the victim of a deliberate libel of murder by a Wichita newspaper writer, W. R. Draper, in 1902, which saw Draper arrested and arraigned for the libel case. Prior to the perpetration of this libel, White Buffalo had risen to chief status for his tribe. This status is evidenced by his portrait, taken by Frank Rinehart, official photographer at the 1898 Indian Congress held in Omaha, Nebraska. That Congress was held in conjunction with the Trans-Mississippi International Exposition and was attended by 500 tribal members from 35 different tribes. Rinehart took a series of photographs of the chiefs of the various tribes during that Indian Congress, labeling White Buffalo as one of the chiefs. In 1929, he was listed in numerous newspapers as the head of a delegation of 108 Oklahoma Indians from 23 tribes who traveled to Washington, DC, to escort Charles Curtis, of Indian blood, to his inauguration as Vice President of the United States. White Buffalo was married to Medicine Woman, a widowed full blood Northern Cheyenne, and at that time in 1910, they had 3 surviving sons of seven children total. He died in late June 1929, and is buried in the Indian Mission Church on the reservation. He was survived by his wife and children.

== Early life ==
White Buffalo was born in Montana as were his parents, according to the 1910 U. S. Federal Census records. The Cheyenne were wide-ranging in their hunting grounds, ranging from Montana to Texas. After the Medicine Lodge Treaty in 1867, in which the U. S. proposed first a reservation in Kansa then one in Indian Territory, most of the Northern Cheyenne and Arapaho were forced to move south to the Indian agency near Fort Supply in present-day Oklahoma. The agency was shortly moved to approximately six miles northwest of the present-day El Reno, Oklahoma and remained there. The tribe lived in tipi villages in various locations on the reservation but faced starvation due to inadequate provisions from the Indian agency. A large part of his tribe "broke out" of the reservation and walked back to their home lands in the Dakota Territory. White Buffalo was about 15 when the Battle of Little Big Horn was fought, in which about half of the Montana tribal members participated.

== Education ==
The first school opened on the Darlington agency in 1875, run by John Seger, and it is likely that White Buffalo was one of the students. He was later sent to the Carlisle Indian Industrial School in Carlisle, Pennsylvania after that school opened in the 1870s. According to records digitized by Dickinson College, White Buffalo arrived at Carlisle Indian Industrial School on February 3, 1881, for a period of three years and was discharged June 17, 1884. White Buffalo returned the Darlington agency and worked initially at the agency's sheet metal shop. As a Carlisle graduate, he was harassed at Darlington by the Cheyenne Dog Soldier society, who were determined not to allow any of the tribe to live in the white man's way, or to farm, as the agency desired.

== Family life ==
He was described in newspaper articles in 1902 as being of striking appearance, as his hair had turned completely white when he was very young. His photo from his Carlisle days, dressed in a suit with a short haircut in the white man's style, shows that to be true. In 1888, when he was 26, he married a full-blood Northern Cheyenne widow. Medicine Woman, who was 30 at the time. She had also been born in Montana as had her parents. On the 1905 Indian Census for their reservation, they had four children listed: Emma White Buffalo, son Receiving Roots, Paul White Buffalo and Pratt White Buffalo - named for the Carlisle School founder. On the 1910 U. S. Federal Census, they are listed with only three of seven surviving children: John White Buffalo, James White Buffalo and Fred White Buffalo. According to the 1910 census, the mother of Medicine Woman also lived with them as well, 76 at the time, widowed and named Siege Woman. Medicine Woman is listed on this census as illiterate, as is her mother. His son, John White Buffalo enlisted for service in World War I. As full blood Cheyenne, both White Buffalo and Medicine Woman received land allotments on the reservation in 1891 in Lincoln Township in present-day Blaine County, Oklahoma. These are listed on several of the Indian Census lists as allotments number 966 and 967. White Buffalo lived to be 67 years old, and died on June 23, 1929, per the 1930 Indian census for the reservation. According to his obituary in the Watonga Republican newspaper dated June 27, 1929, he is buried at the Indian Mission Church on the reservation and was survived by his wife and sons.

== Tribal work ==
White Buffalo was one of several Carlisle alumni chosen by the Darlington agency to attend additional training in farming soon after his return. Sometime during his twenties, he enlisted and served as an Army scout in the detachment headed by Edward W. Casey. After receiving his land allotment, he began farming his own land and built his home for his family. This is according to the 1910 U. S. Federal Census which had additional questions for Indian families, one of which asked if the family was living in primitive or civilized housing. He also rose to chief status (there were many chiefs) as evidenced by his attendance at the Indian Congresses, held in 1898, 1901 and 1904. His position as a Carlisle graduate would have given him much opportunity to work for his tribe with the agency leaders as most of the tribe was illiterate and a disadvantage in any such dealings. In early March 1929, only three months before he died, he was listed as chief and head of a delegation of 108 Oklahoma Indians from 23 tribes who went to Washington, DC, to act as escort for Charles Curtis, who was an American Indian, for his inauguration as Vice President of the United States.

== National libel scandal ==
When he was 40 years old, in 1902, a white freelance newspaper writer in Wichita, W. R. Draper, wrote a completely fictitious article, naming Carlisle graduate White Buffalo of the Darlington reservation, as the lover and confessed murderer of three white women: Maude Ellis, Margaret Andrews and Annie Dennis. The article stated that White Buffalo had honed his hatred of whites during his time as a student at Carlisle and was then awaiting trial in the Darlington area jail. Draper mailed the article to the Philadelphia North American newspaper where it was purchased and first published on July 27, 1902. The sensational article was picked up and reprinted by newspapers all over the country.

Carlisle founder and head, Lt Colonel Richard Henry Pratt sent for White Buffalo to return to Carlisle and together they went to the Philadelphia North American to refute the article. The newspaper took this fraud very seriously, printed a full retraction and later had W. R. Draper arrested in St Louis where he had fled. The newspaper was the plaintiff in the case against Draper as it was felt the court would take the charges more seriously and they also wanted to set a precedent for other writers who submitted articles. In St Louis, Lt. Colonel Pratt, White Buffalo, Judge James Gay Gordon (attorney for the North American), plus two editors for the newspaper appeared for the task of having Draper returned to Kansas for prosecution on the charge of criminal libel. The Wichita Daily Eagle printed a lengthy article regarding the fraud and libel on November 27, 1902. The retractions of the original article were reprinted as well by other newspapers as far away as New England, Utah and California. White Buffalo was quoted as saying that he had traveled several times to Pennsylvania as well as to Missouri and Kansas to be a witness for the newspaper's libel charges against Draper. The initial trial was postponed after which Draper was eventually released by the second judge in the case.

== Notes ==
- Berthrong, Donald J (1976). The Cheyenne and Arapaho Ordeal: Reservation and Agency Life in the Indian Territory, 1875-1907. Norman, OK: University of Oklahoma Press.
- Svingen, Orlan J (1998). the Northern Cheyenne Indian Reservation, 1877-1900. Niwot, CO: University Press of Colorado. ISBN 9780870814860.
- "Fort Wayne". Fort Wayne News. August 20, 1902.
- "1910 U S Federal Census". Ancestry.com.
- Grinnell, George Bird (1956). The Fighting Cheyenne. Norman, OK: University of Oklahoma Press.
- "St Louis". St Louis Dispatch. November 25, 1902.
- "Wichita Daily Eagle". Wichita Daily Eagle. Nov 27, 1902.
- "Miami OK News-Record". Miami News-Record. March 3, 1929.

== Additional reading ==
- They Called Me Uncivilized, by Walter Littlemoon.
- Tell Them We Are Going Home:, The Odyssey of the Northern Cheyennes, by John H. Monnett
