= Sally Brayley =

Canadian-American ballet dancer (1937–2026)

- Born: September 18, 1937; London, England
- Died: June 18, 2026 (aged 88); St. Louis, Missouri, US
- Occupation: Ballet dancer

Sarah Brayley Bliss (née Brayley; September 18, 1937 – June 18, 2026) was a Canadian-American ballet dancer. She performed as a principal dancer with the Metropolitan Opera and the New York City Opera. Brayley was described by Webster University as "an internationally renowned ballet dancer, coach, and master teacher." Ronald Reagan appointed her to the National Council on the Arts for a six-year term in 1986.

== Early life and education ==
Brayley was born in London, England, on September 18, 1937, to Canadian parents on September 18, 1937. She was raised in Halifax, Nova Scotia. Her father, Jack, was a journalist and his career caused the family to make several moves, from Montreal to Ottawa to Halifax. She began taking dance lessons at the age of five and the family ensured that she continued studying dance wherever they moved. She left high school to pursue a career in dance.

== Career ==
In 1956, Brayley began dancing at the National Ballet of Canada. She left the company when she moved to New York in 1962. In the United States, she performed as a guest artist with the American Ballet Theatre and the Joffrey Ballet. She performed as a principal dancer with the Metropolitan Opera and the New York City Opera.

In 1969, Brayley co-founded the Joffrey II Dancers, a ballet troupe for beginning dancers, and served as artistic director until 1986. There, she trained 16 dancers, including Ron Reagan, the son of President Ronald Reagan.

In 1987, after Antony Tudor's death, Brayley was named Trustee of the Antony Tudor Ballet Trust. In 1995, she left New York City and became Executive Director of Dance St. Louis. After working there for 11 years, she was named Executive Director Emeritus. At the company, Brayley widely expanded its education and outreach programs, established the organization's fundraising programs, and "[maintained] an unbroken tradition of bringing extraordinary dance to St. Louis audiences." Brayley retired from Dance St. Louis in June 2006.

== Personal life ==
In 1967, Brayley married Anthony Addison Bliss, a lawyer who was the former General Manager of the Metropolitan Opera. They resided in Oyster Bay, New York. Bliss died in 1991. The couple had two sons, Mark and Timothy.

Brayley was a breast-cancer survivor. She died in St. Louis, Missouri on June 18, 2026, at the age of 88.

== Honors and awards ==
The Sally Brayley Bliss Award is named after her and is awarded by Dance Nova Scotia to choreographers continuing with their dance studies.

In 1986, Ronald Reagan appointed her for a six-year term to the National Council on the Arts, succeeding Martha Graham.

In 1988, the Canadian Women’s Club of New York City honored Brayley as Woman of the Year.
