= Mary Quinn Sullivan =

American art collector

- Born: Mary Josephine Quinn; November 24, 1877; Indianapolis, Indiana, USA
- Died: December 5, 1939 (aged 62); Queens, New York, USA
- Resting place: Holy Cross Cemetery, Indianapolis, Indiana, USA
- Education: Pratt Institute, Slade School of Fine Art, London
- Known for: modern art collector, founding trustee of the Museum of Modern Art
- Spouse(s): Cornelius J. Sullivan (1917–1932; his death)
- Parent(s): Thomas F. Quinn; Anne E. (Gleason) Quinn

Mary Quinn Sullivan (November 24, 1877 – December 5, 1939), born Mary Josephine Quinn, was a pioneering collector of European and American modern and contemporary art and gallerist, and a founding trustee of the Museum of Modern Art, which opened in rented space in New York City in November 1929. She also led a small group of Indianapolis, Indiana, art patrons who called themselves the Gamboliers and between 1928 and 1934 selected artworks of for the group that brought some of the first modern and contemporary works to the collections of the John Herron Art Institute, which later became the Indianapolis Museum of Art.

Mary and Cornelius J. Sullivan, her husband, amassed a significant private collection of art during the 1920s and 1930s that included Modigliani's Sculptured Head of a Woman, Paul Cézanne's Madame Cézanne, Georges Rouault's Crucifixion, and a Hepplewhite desk that once belonged to Edgar Degas, as well as works by Pierre-Auguste Renoir, Paul Gauguin, Henri de Toulouse-Lautrec, Vincent van Gogh, Pierre Bonnard, Pablo Picasso, and others.

The Indiana native trained for a career as an artist at the Pratt Institute in Brooklyn, New York, and in 1909 she studied at the Slade School of Fine Art in London, England, for a semester. Sullivan became an art teacher in the New York City public schools and a member of the faculty at Pratt Institute's School of Household Science and Arts. She also authored a textbook, Planning and Furnishing the Home: Practical and Economical Suggestions for the Homemaker (1914). Sullivan operated an art gallery in New York City in her later years, but the Great Depression and financial difficulties in the 1930s subsequently led to the decision to sell her private art collection at auction.

== Early life and education ==
Mary Josephine Quinn was born in Indianapolis, Indiana, on November 24, 1877. She was the eldest of Thomas F. and Anne E. (Gleason) Quinn's eight children (six daughters and two sons). Thomas Quinn, came to Indianapolis in 1857 and by 1877 was farming land outside the city.

Interested in art from an early age, Mary Quinn attended public schools in Indianapolis, including the Shortridge High School. Quinn took classes from Roda Selleck, the head of the high school's art department, and served as Selleck's assistant. In 1899, Quinn received a scholarship to study art at the Pratt Institute in Brooklyn, New York, and moved to New York City to pursue a career as an artist. While living in New York, she met Katherine Dreier, a fellow art student and the two became a lifelong friends through a shared interest in modern art. Quinn resided in the Brooklyn Heights home of Katherine Dreier's father, Theodor Dreier, during the early 20th century.

In 1901, Quinn was hired as an art teacher in the Queens, New York school system. In 1902, the New York Board of Education sent her to Europe to observe the curriculum of art schools. Katherine Drier accompanied Quinn during the trip, which included visits to France and Italy. Their travels exposed the two women to the modern art movements of the time (Impressionism and Post-Impressionism). Dreier went on to establish the Société Anonyme in 1920, a group of art patrons that promoted modern art. Its collection, which was presented to Yale University in 1941, became "the core collection of the Yale University Art Gallery." Mary Quinn Sullivan is listed as a member of the Société Anonyme in Dreier's archives.

Quinn taught art at the DeWitt Clinton High School in New York City for several years, becoming head of the school's art department by 1909. However, she resigned from teaching and returned to Europe to study at the Slade School of Fine Art in London, England, during the fall term of 1909. Quinn also attended lectures from critic and artist Roger Fry. Upon her return to New York in 1910, Quinn accepted a faculty position at Pratt Institute as an instructor of drawing and design at its School of Household Sciences and Arts. She later became supervisor of design.

In addition, Quinn served as secretary of the New York High School Teacher's Association. She also authored a textbook, Planning and Furnishing the Home: Practical and Economical Suggestions for the Homemaker (1914). Quinn resigned from the Pratt Institute and left the teaching profession in October 1917.

== Marriage ==
Mary Quinn married Cornelius J. Sullivan, a prominent New York lawyer, on November 21, 1917. The couple had no children. The Sullivans established a home in the Hell's Gate area of Astoria, Queens, where they entertained artists, writers, and politicians. (The neighborhood is now occupied by a Con Ed power plant.) The Sullivans often spent summers in Ireland, and maintained a second home on Block Island, Rhode Island.

Cornelius Sullivan, who specialized in managing large trusts and divorce proceedings for the wealthy, was a member of the New York Board of Education. He was also a friend of John Quinn a Harvard Law School classmate and an art and manuscript collector. C. J. Sullivan was a collector of rare books and manuscripts, antiques, and art. John Quinn and C. J. Sullivan also shared an enthusiasm for collecting and identifying themselves as "Irish patriots."

== Art patron and philanthropist ==
Mary and Cornelius Sullivan made frequent trips to Europe and visited galleries in New York to amass their private collection of European and American art. The couple displayed their collection of modern French art in their home in Astoria, Queens. Mary Sullivan began her own art collection in the 1920s. She made her first major purchase in February 1927 at the estate auction of John Quinn. Over the years the Sullivans' collection expanded to include American and Irish antiques, as well as modern art such as Modigliani's Sculptured Head of a Woman (acquired from Leopold Zborowski), Paul Cézanne's Madame Cézanne, a Hepplewhite desk which once belonged to Edgar Degas, Georges Rouault's Crucifixion, Vincent van Gogh's Mlle. Ravoux, and Winslow Homer's The New Novel to name but a few.

After her marriage, Mary Sullivan also became a strong supporter of philanthropic causes. She served as the president of the Needle and Bobbin Club in New York City. This women's group sold lacework for charity, most notably works by women in poorhouses at Blackwell's Island. She also gave lectures about the history of lacework on behalf of the club. In addition, Sullivan supported causes such as the Handwork Centre at 511 Madison Avenue that sold toys made by the elderly, infirm, and unemployed. As late as 1921, Sullivan was noted to be the secretary and chairman of the New York Society of Occupation Therapy, which operated a summer program at Byrdcliffe Colony in Woodstock, New York. The program taught the basics of art and applied arts instruction to hospital aides and nurses.

== Indianapolis Museum of Art's Gamboliers ==
In 1927, Sullivan and Indianapolis art patron Carl Lieber organized a small group of Indianapolis art patrons who called themselves the Gamboliers to acquire modern and contemporary art for the John Herron Institute, the predecessor to the Indianapolis Museum of Art. As the leader of the group, Sullivan began choosing works of art in 1928 on their behalf in New York City and during her frequent travels to Europe. Working with an annual budget of $2,500, she purchased 160 works of art for the Gamboliers that usually ranged in price from $10 to $25 each. By the time the group disbanded in 1934, its collection were mostly on paper and included works from new and upcoming American and European artists such as Modigliani, Henri Matisse, and Henri de Toulouse-Lautrec, among others. The group's best-known purchase was a Toulouse-Lautrec color lithograph, Moulin Rouge: La Goulue, which the Herron Art Institute received in 1936.

During summer of 1928, Sullivan also helped the Herron Art Institute organize two exhibitions of modern paintings from French and American artists. In addition, she helped bring to Indianapolis in January 1932 a temporary exhibition of 111 works of modern art. In February 1932, the Herron Art Institute opened an exhibition to showcase the works of art that Sullivan had helped the Gamboliers to acquire.

== The Museum of Modern Art ==
During the 1920s, Sullivan established friendships with art patrons Lillie Plummer Bliss and Abby Aldrich Rockefeller, and in early 1929, the three women and Arthur Bowen Davies began discussions for a new museum of modern art in New York City. During a luncheon with collector A. Conger Goodyear, who agreed to serve as chairman of the museum's organizing committee, the group began developing definite plans for what became the Museum of Modern Art. The museum opened in November 1929 in rented space at its temporary quarters in a New York City office building at 730 Fifth Avenue. In 1932, the museum moved into its own facility on 53rd Street.

Mary Sullivan was one of the seven signers of the museum's charter and "worked tirelessly to assist in any way she could." Her husband, Cornelius Sullivan, drafted the art museum's incorporation documents and served as its legal advisor until his death in 1932. Mary Sullivan chaired several of the museum's committees before her resignation and retirement from the board of trustees on October 17, 1933, due to financial difficulties. She was made an honorary trustee for life in 1935.

== Later years ==
After the death of her husband in 1932, Mary Sullivan opened an art gallery on East 56th Street in New York City. She later moved her gallery to a two-room space in Lois Shaw's gallery on Park Avenue. The gallery hosted exhibitions of Chaïm Soutine's work, among others, and employed a young Betty Parsons, who acknowledged that Sullivan's business sense and taste made an enduring impression on her.

The Great Depression and other financial difficulties caused by Cornelius Sullivan's death in 1932 subsequently led to Mary Sullivan's decision to disburse their art collection. Some of the collection from her husband's estate and a portion of her own collection were sold at auction in April 1937 at Anderson Galleries. In December 1939, Sullivan, who was ill by that time, consigned 202 additional pieces from their collection for sale at a two-day auction at Parke-Bernet, which later became affiliated with Sotheby's. The auction began on December 6, 1939, and was one of the major modern art auctions since John Quinn's death in 1927. Sullivan died the night before the auction, when her collection of modern art, which included works by Pierre-Auguste Renoir, Cézanne, Paul Gauguin, Toulouse-Lautrec, and van Gogh, as well as Pierre Bonnard, Pablo Picasso, and Modigliani, among others, passed into other collections.

== Death and legacy ==
Mary Quinn Sullivan died in Astoria, Queens, New York, on December 5, 1939, of complications from pleurisy and diabetes. Following funeral services at New York City and Indianapolis, her remains were interred at Holy Cross Cemetery in Indianapolis, Indiana.

Working with Lillie Plummer Bliss, Abby Aldrich Rockefeller, and others, Sullivan established the Museum of Modern Art, which opened in New York City in November 1929, and continued to support the institution as a member of its board of trustees until 1933 and an honorary trustee until her death in 1939. Rockefeller purchased two works from the auction of Mary Quinn Sullivan's collection in December 1939 (a Modgliani and an André Derain) and placed them in the permanent collection of the Museum of Modern Art as a tribute to her late friend. Sullivan's selections of art works between 1928 and 1934 on behalf of the Indianapolis group of collectors called the Gamboliers brought some of the first modern and contemporary artworks to the collections of the John Herron Art Institute, which later became the Indianapolis Museum of Art. The private art collection that she and her husband, Cornelius J. Sullivan, amassed during the 1920s and 1930s, which included modern and contemporary works from notable American and European artists was later sold and passed into other collections.
