= Frederick Johann Weber =

Austrian-American photographer

Frederick Johann Weber (March 4, 1881 – 1967) was an Austrian-American photographer based in Jamaica, Queens. He had clients throughout Queens, Brooklyn, and suburban Long Island.

== Early life ==
Weber was born in Garberback, Austria on March 4, 1881. He moved to New York City in 1899, settling in the Rockaways and working as a freelance newspaper photographer, primarily in Manhattan. In partnership with Peter Nybo, he established his own photography business in Jamaica.

== Career ==
Weber was the official legal photographer for the Long Island Rail Road. He photographed many accidents for insurance purposes. He also worked for Jamaica High School. His photos also appeared in Long Island Daily Press and Queensborough Magazine, and City Journal.

== Retirement, death, and legacy ==
Weber retired in 1959. He sold most of his photographs to Ron Ziel and the Queens Library in 1966, and died the following year. The Queens Library did a retrospective of his work, including 7,689 photographs, in 2004. Previously, his works received an exhibition at the Jamaica Arts Center in 1980.

== Publications ==
The following books include photos by Weber:

- Lighting the Way: The Centennial History of the Queens Borough Public Library, 1896-1996 by Jeffrey Kroessler. Virginia Beach, Va. : Donning Co., c1996.
- Old Queens, New York, in Early Photographs by Vincent Seyfried and William Asadorian. New York : Dover Publications, 1991.
- Caribbean-Americans in New York City by F. Donnie Forde. Charleston, SC : Arcadia, c2002.
- Richmond Hill by Carl Ballenas and Nancy Cataldi. Dover, NH : Arcadia, 2002.
