= Cornelius Newton Bliss =

American politician

Cornelius Bliss
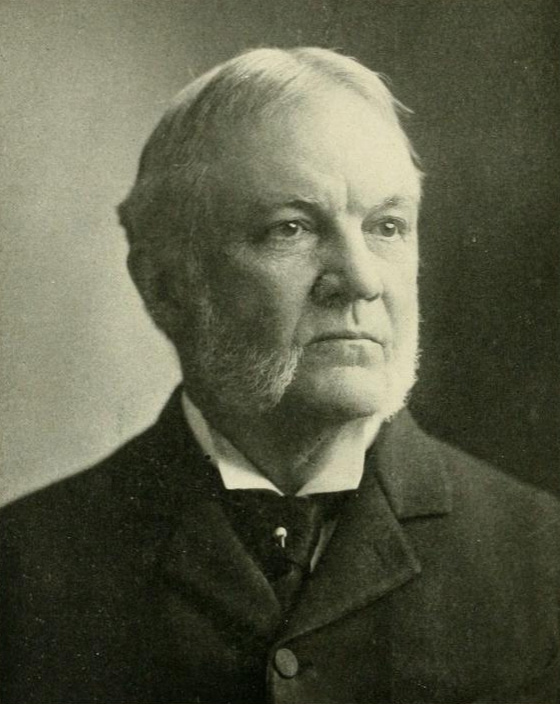

21st United States Secretary of the Interior
- In office March 6, 1897 – February 19, 1899
- President: William McKinley
- Preceded by: David R. Francis
- Succeeded by: Ethan Hitchcock

Chair of the New York Republican Party
- In office 1897–1899
- Preceded by: Chester S. Cole
- Succeeded by: John N. Knapp

Personal details
- Born: Cornelius Newton Bliss; January 26, 1833 Fall River, Massachusetts, U.S.
- Died: October 9, 1911 (aged 78) New York City, New York, U.S.
- Party: Republican
- Spouse: Mary Plummer (m. 1859)
- Children: 4, including Lillie, Cornelius

Cornelius Newton Bliss (January 26, 1833 – October 9, 1911) was an American merchant, politician and art collector, who served as Secretary of the Interior in the administration of President William McKinley and as Treasurer of the Republican National Convention in four successive campaigns.

== Early life ==
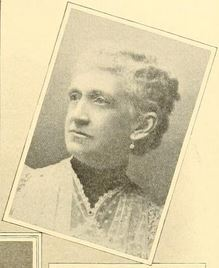
Mary Elizabeth Plummer

Cornelius Bliss was born at Fall River, Massachusetts. He was the son of Asahel Newton and Irene Borden (née Luther) Bliss. His family was of English ancestry and their earliest American ancestor was Thomas Bliss, who emigrated from Belstone, Devonshire, to New England in 1635. His father died when he was an infant and his mother remarried to Edward S. Keep. They moved to New Orleans in 1840.

He was educated in his native city and in New Orleans, where he early entered his stepfather's counting house.

== Career ==
Returning to Massachusetts in 1849, he became a clerk and subsequently a junior partner in a prominent Boston commercial house. Later he moved to New York City to establish a branch of the firm. The firm, originally Wright & Whitman, in 1874 became Wright, Bliss & Fabyan upon the death of the senior partner, Mr. John S. Wright. On the death in 1881 of Mr. Eben Wright, the firm became Bliss, Fabyan & Co., under which name it continued until well into the 20th century. Bliss, Fabyan & Co. was one of the largest wholesale dry-goods houses in the country.

=== Politics ===
A consistent advocate of the protective tariff, he was one of the organizers and for many years president of the American Protective Tariff League. In politics an active Republican, he was chairman of the Republican state committee in 1887 and 1888, and contributed much to the success of the Harrison ticket in New York in the latter year. He was treasurer of the Republican National Committee from 1892 to 1904. He turned down the offer of becoming United States Secretary of the Treasury under President McKinley, but he served as United States Secretary of the Interior in President William McKinley's cabinet from 1897 to 1899.

In 1900, he was invited to stand as President McKinley's vice-president. He refused the offer. The following year McKinley was assassinated and Theodore Roosevelt (who did accept the offer) became president.

== Personal life ==
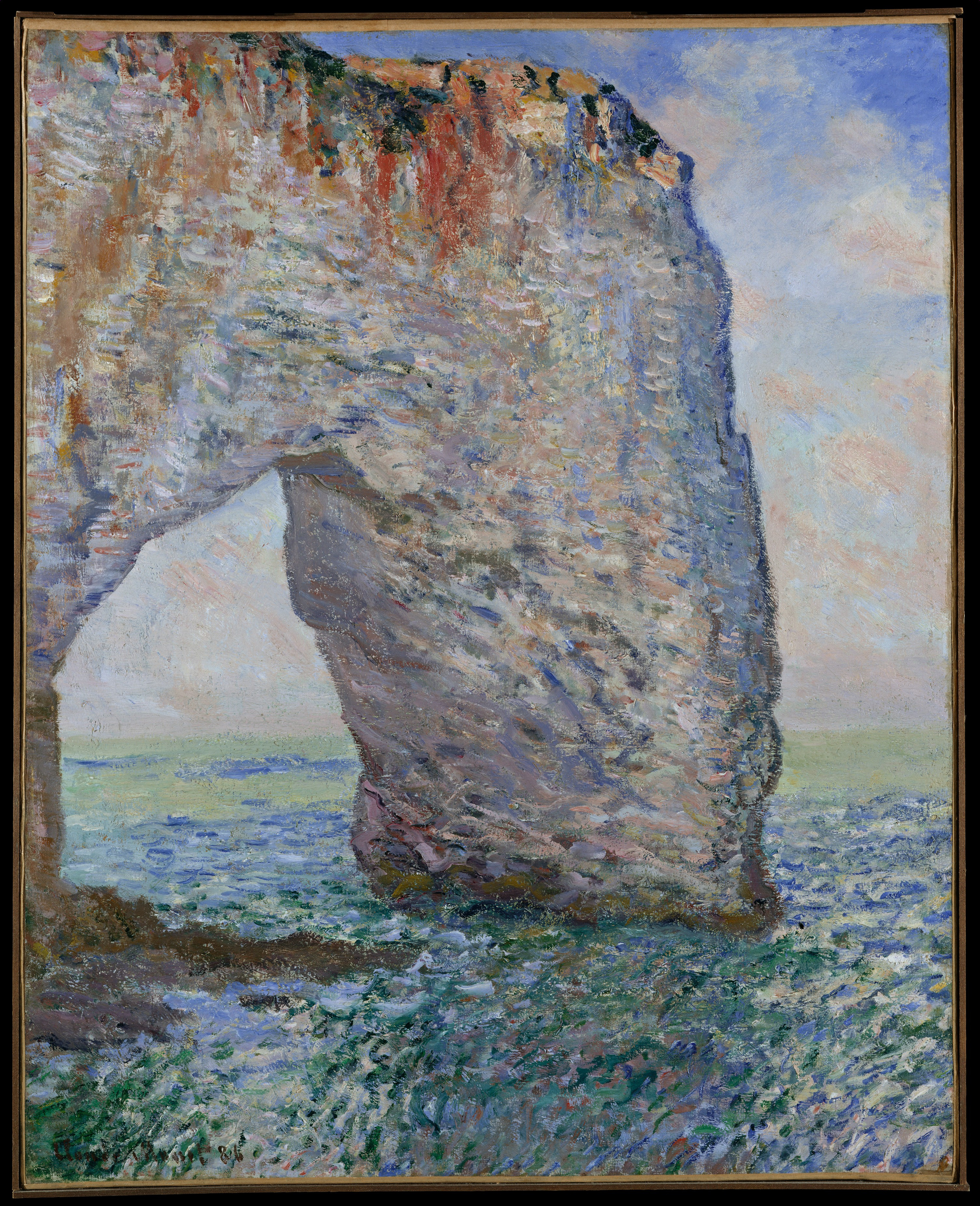
Claude Monet's The Manneporte near Étretat, owned by Bliss

On March 30, 1859, Bliss was married to Mary Elizabeth Plummer (1837–1923), the daughter of Hon. Avery Plummer of Boston. Together, they were the parents of four children, two who survived him:

- Nellie Bliss (b. 1861), who died young.
- Lizzie Plummer Bliss (1864–1931), one of the founders of the Museum of Modern Art in New York City.
- George Bliss, who died young.
- Cornelius Newton Bliss Jr. (1875–1949), a prominent financier who married Zaidee Cobb (1881-1966).

He was also a member of the famous Jekyll Island Club (a.k.a. The Millionaires Club) on Jekyll Island, Georgia.

Bliss' health began to fail in 1910. He spent the summer of 1911 at his country home in Rumson, New Jersey, accompanied by his physician Arthur W. Bingham, but returned to New York City in September due to his frailty. He spent the last two weeks of his life at his residence at 29 East 37th Street before succumbing to heart disease at 7 pm on October 9, 1911. He is buried in Woodlawn Cemetery, Bronx, New York.

=== Legacy ===
Cornelius Bliss was a collector of fine art. He owned works by Arthur Bowen Davies, along with Claude Monet's The Manneporte near Étretat, now at the Metropolitan Museum of Art.

Party political offices
Preceded by Chester S. Cole	Chairman of the New York; Republican State Committee; 1887 – 1889	Succeeded by John N. Knapp
Political offices
Preceded by David Rowland Francis	U.S. Secretary of the Interior; Served under: William McKinley; 1897 – 1899	Succeeded by Ethan A. Hitchcock
