= The Laundress (Daumier) =

Painting by Honoré Daumier

The Laundress (La Blanchisseuse)
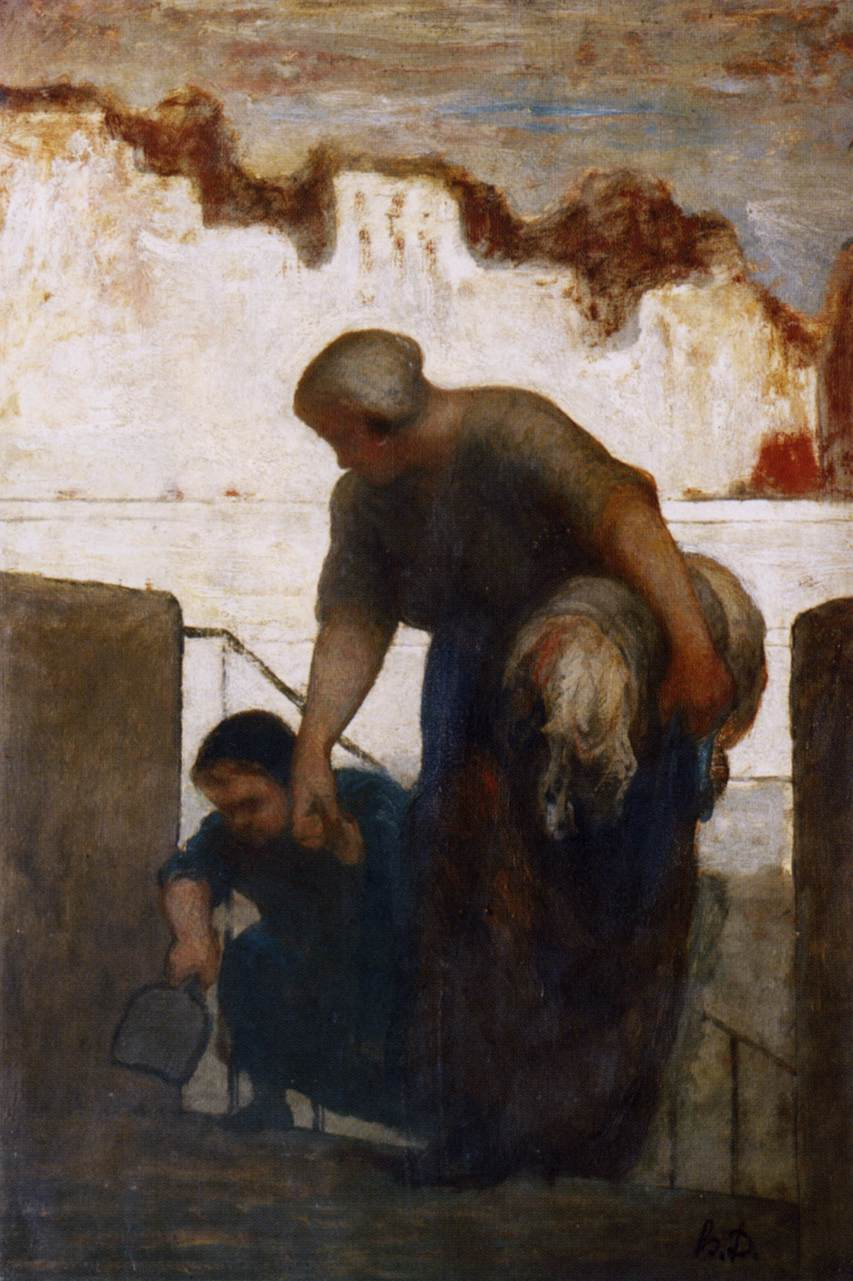
- Artist: Honoré Daumier
- Year: c. 1863
- Type: Oil on panel
- Dimensions: 49 cm × 33.5 cm (19 in × 13.2 in)
- Location: Musée d'Orsay, Paris

The Laundress (La Blanchisseuse) (also known in English as The Washerwoman) is an oil-on-panel painted by French artist Honoré Daumier in 1863. It is exhibited at the Musée d'Orsay in Paris. The subject of laundresses, also known as washerwomen, was a popular one in art, especially in France.

== History ==
Acquired by the Louvre in 1927 and since 1986 exhibited at the Musée d'Orsay, this painting has another two versions, currently housed at the Metropolitan Museum of Art, in New York, and at the Albright-Knox Art Gallery of Buffalo, New York.

Daumier lived on the Quai d'Anjou on the Île Saint-Louis in central Paris, and had plenty of opportunities for observing the attitudes of the washerwomen returning from the lavoir on the Seine, as they wearily climbed the stone steps, bent beneath the weight of their bundles of washing. Nevertheless, there is a strength as well as fatigue expressed in the body of this mature woman, accompanied by her child, whom there is evidently nobody to mind at home. The summary handling of the paint avoids any suggestion of anecdote and gives a monumental quality to this little picture.

As said, Daumier painted several variations on this theme: numerous replicas of them exist, some apocryphal. The Louvre-acquired work appears, according to critics, to be far the best. One of them – under the title Blanchisseuse – was exhibited by the painter at the Salon of 1861.
