= Frederick Theodore Weber =

American painter

Frederick Theodore Weber (1883–1956) was an American painter, etcher, and sculptor. Born in Columbia, South Carolina, he traveled abroad as a youth, studying under Ferdinand Humbert and Jean-Paul Laurens at the École des Beaux-Arts in Paris. Active in New York City, he has works in the Metropolitan Museum of Art, Brooklyn Museum, and the Smithsonian American Art Museum.
