= George V. Forman =

American lawyer

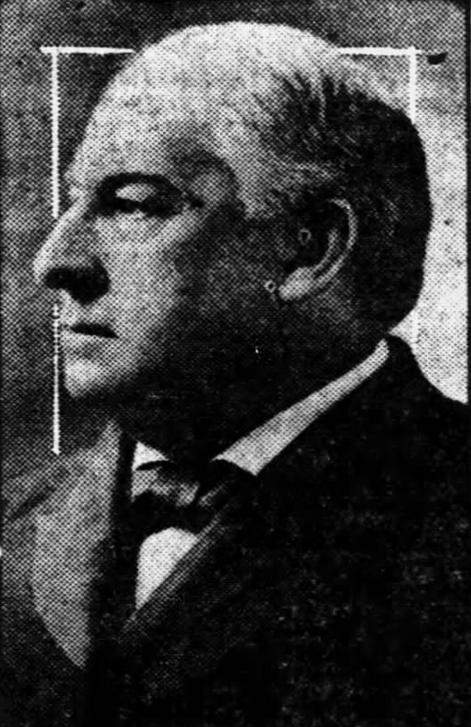
- Born: George Van Syckel Forman; December 3, 1841; Milford, New Jersey, United States
- Died: October 22, 1922 (aged 80); Buffalo, New York, United States
- Resting place: Mount View Cemetery in Olean, New York
- Education: Princeton University
- Occupations: Lawyer, Banker
- Spouse: Martha Carter
- Children: 3
- Relatives: Anson Goodyear (son-in-law)

George V. Forman (December 3, 1841 – October 22, 1922) was a founder of VanderGrift, Forman & Company, which became part of the Standard Oil Company. Forman was also a prominent Buffalo banker in the late 1800s and early 1900s, founding the Fidelity Trust and Guaranty Company, which later merged with the Manufacturers and Traders Trust Company to become M&T Bank.

== Early life ==
George Van Syckel Forman was born near Milford, New Jersey in 1841. After graduating from Princeton University in 1861, he practiced law in Trenton, New Jersey. Later, he moved to Oil City, Pennsylvania, where with Capt. J. J. Vandergrift, he established the Oil City Trust Co., of which Forman was president for a time.

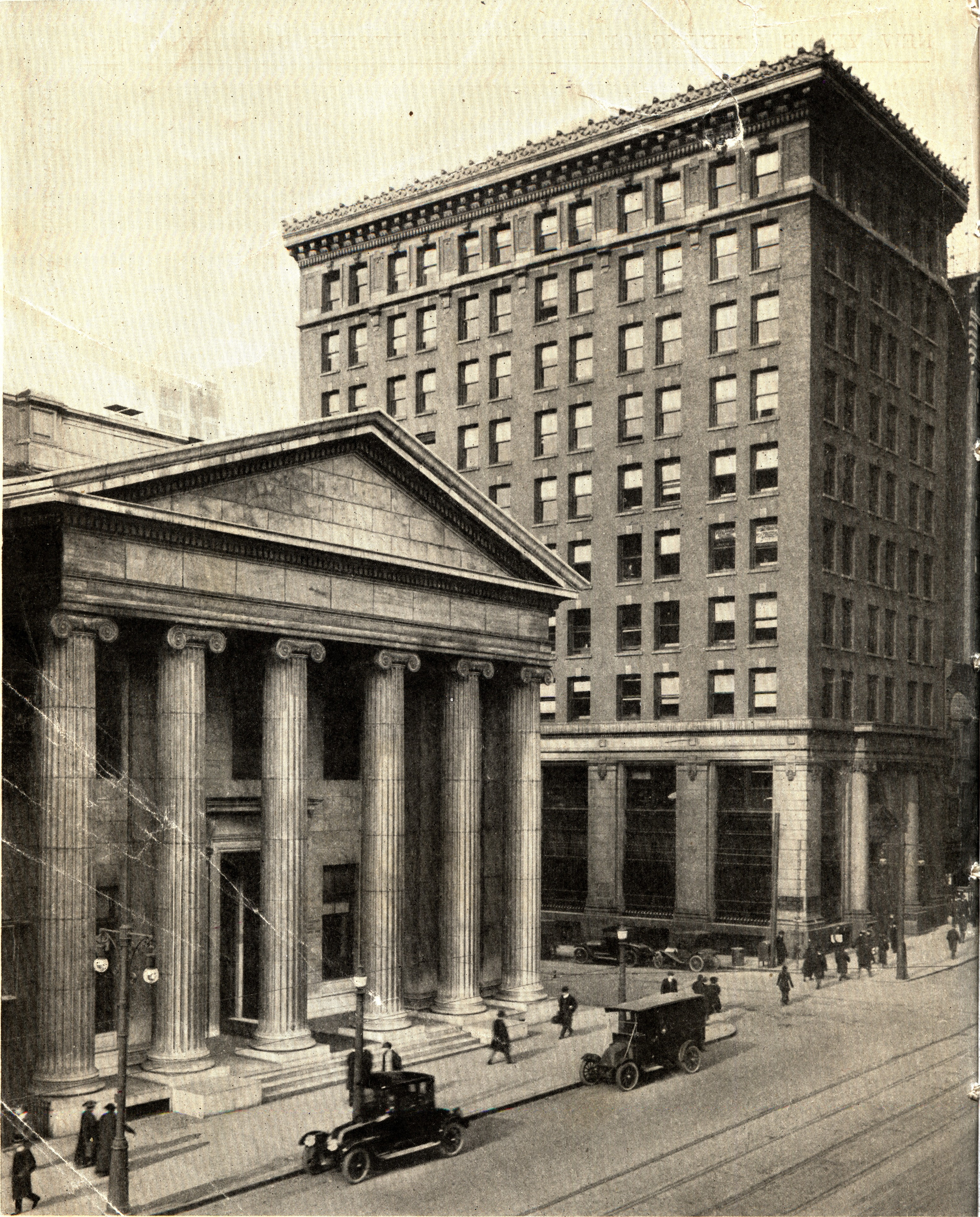
"Manufacturer's & Traders National Bank" on the left and "Fidelity Trust Company" on the right, 1916

== Business career ==
While a resident of Olean, New York, and a member of the Exchange National Bank of Olean, Forman organized the Eastern Oil Co. incorporated in West Virginia. He then came to Buffalo, New York, to be president of the company.

In May 1893, Forman, along with John J. Albright, John Satterfield, and Franklin D. Locke, founded the Fidelity Trust and Guaranty Company of Buffalo, New York, of which he became president. In 1909, E. B. Green was commissioned to build the Fidelity Trust Building, today known as Swan Tower and owned by Ellicott Development Co., located at 284 Main Street in Buffalo.

Forman, a very punctual man, according to Anson Goodyear, "every morning left his house at a certain hour and met George Williams at his house just above North Street, to walk to the Fidelity Building together. Mr. Forman boasted a very prominent corporation and leaned backward to achieve his balance. Mr. Williams was emaciated and bent forward to achieve his. It was a procession on which people checked their watches."

In December 1925, a few years after his death in 1922, the Fidelity Trust Company, with $35 million in assets, merged with Manufacturers and Traders Bank, founded in 1856, with $64 million in assets, under the new name Manufacturers and Traders Trust Company. The $100-million company was headed by Fidelity's president, 36-year-old Lewis G. Harriman. Harriman and a group of investors including A. H. Schoellkopf, from the founding family of the Niagara Falls Hydraulic Power and Manufacturing Company, and James Forrestal, who would become the first United States Secretary of Defense, owned enough shares to control both Fidelity and M&T.

== Personal life ==
Forman was married to Martha Carter (1849–1931), also from New Jersey, with whom he had three children.

- Howard Arter Forman (1870–1931), who married Georgia M. Green (1871–1955), daughter of George C. Greene, was the general counsel for the Lake Shore Railroad. Howard served as vice president of Eastern Petroleum, and during World War I, he was the federal fuel administrator for Buffalo. After the war, Georgia and he separated, and by the early 1920s, he had moved to Lexington, Kentucky, where he died in 1931. Georgia served for more than a decade on the board of managers of Children's Hospital and was a contributor to the Room of Contemporary Art at the Albright Art Gallery.
- George Alfred Forman (1875–1923), who married Lucie Matter (b. 1883), was the founder, president, and principal stockholder of Southwestern Petroleum Company, a West Virginia corporation with offices in Buffalo; he was reportedly worth $5 million (equivalent to $91,793,000 in 2025) when he died about the steamer Berengaria as the liner was about to dock at Plymouth, England, in 1925. After George's death, his widow remarried Harry Blanchard Spaulding (1881–1955), grandson of Elbridge G. Spaulding.
- Mary Martha Forman married Anson Goodyear (1877–1964), the son of Charles W. Goodyear, on June 29, 1904. He was president of the Great Southern Lumber Company, vice president of the Buffalo and Susquehanna Railroad, and helped establish the Museum of Modern Art in New York City, of which he was the first president (1929–39), as well as a member of the board of trustees. The marriage ended in divorce.

Forman died on October 22, 1922, and is buried at Mount View Cemetery in Olean, New York.

=== Residence ===
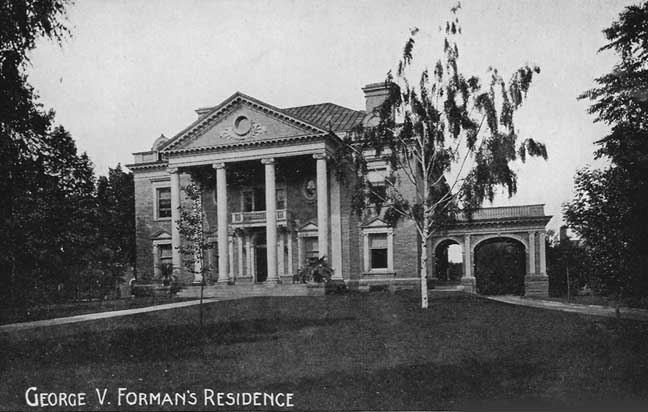
Forman Residence on Delaware Avenue, Buffalo, New York

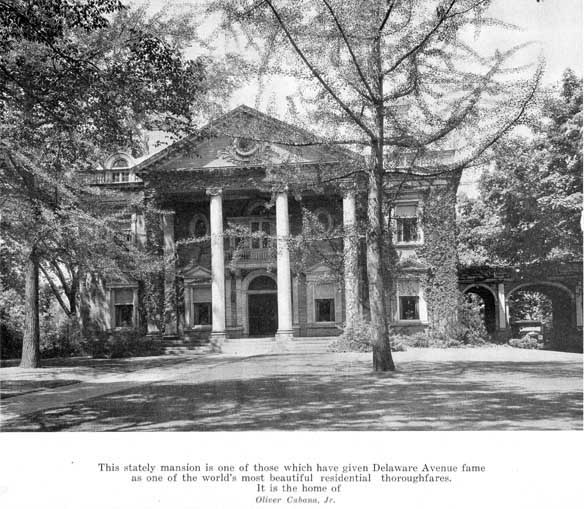
Forman Residence on Delaware Avenue (when it was owned by Oliver Cabana Jr.)

In 1893, Forman built the beaux arts classical mansion, now known as the Forman-Cabana House, for his family at 824 Delaware Avenue in Buffalo in the present day Delaware Avenue Historic District. The home was designed by Green & Wicks with E. B. Green serving as the principal designer. The home is fronted by prominent columns and features yellow Roman brick, and the round arched front entrance has flanking paired fluted Ionic pilasters. Today, the residence is home to Child and Family Services and the Stanley G. Falk School, which is located in the carriage house.

== See also ==
- Goodyear family (New York)
