= Ellicott Square Building =

Office in Buffalo, New York

Coordinates: 42.8822°N 78.8750°W

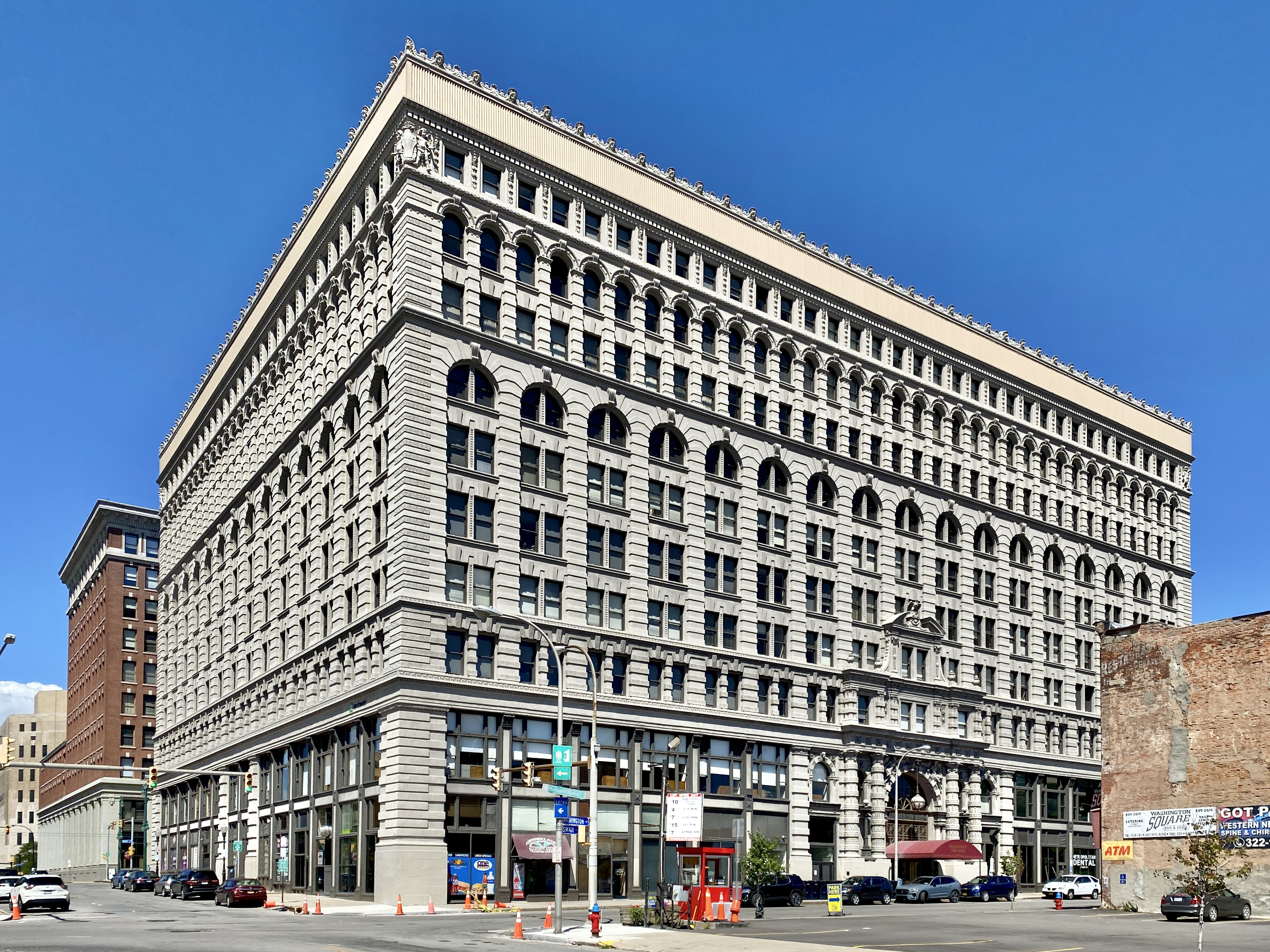

General information
- Status: Completed
- Type: Office
- Location: 295 Main Street, Buffalo, NY, United States
- Completed: 1896
- Cost: $3.5m (1896)
- Owner: Ellicott Development Co.

Height
- Roof: 164.00 ft (49.99 m)

Technical details
- Floor count: 10
- Floor area: 447,000 sq ft (41,527.7 m^{2})

Design and construction
- Architect: Daniel Burnham & Co
- Developer: Ellicott Development Co.

The Ellicott Square Building is a historic office complex, completed in 1896, located in Buffalo, New York. It is found within the Joseph Ellicott Historic District.

== History ==
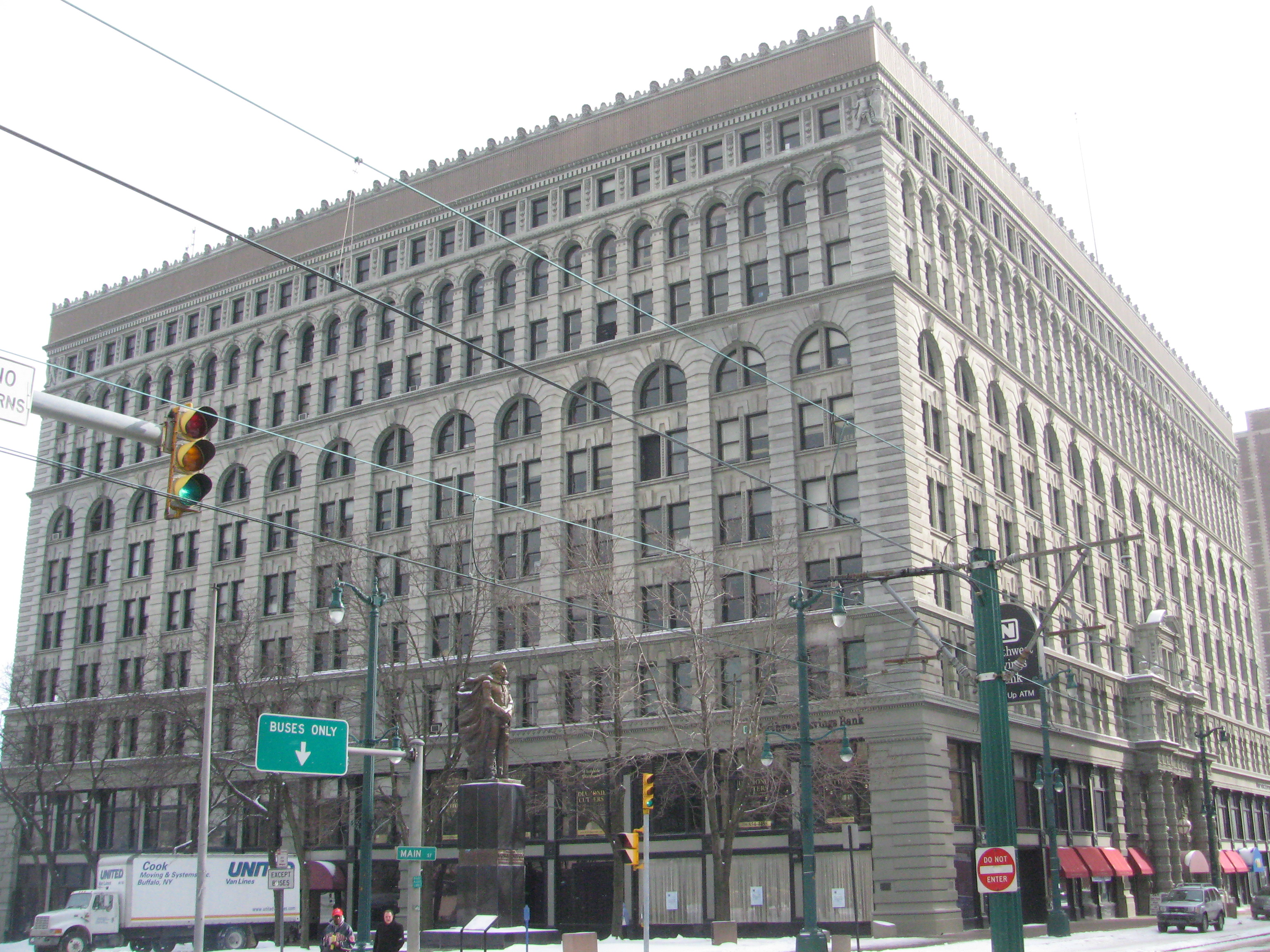
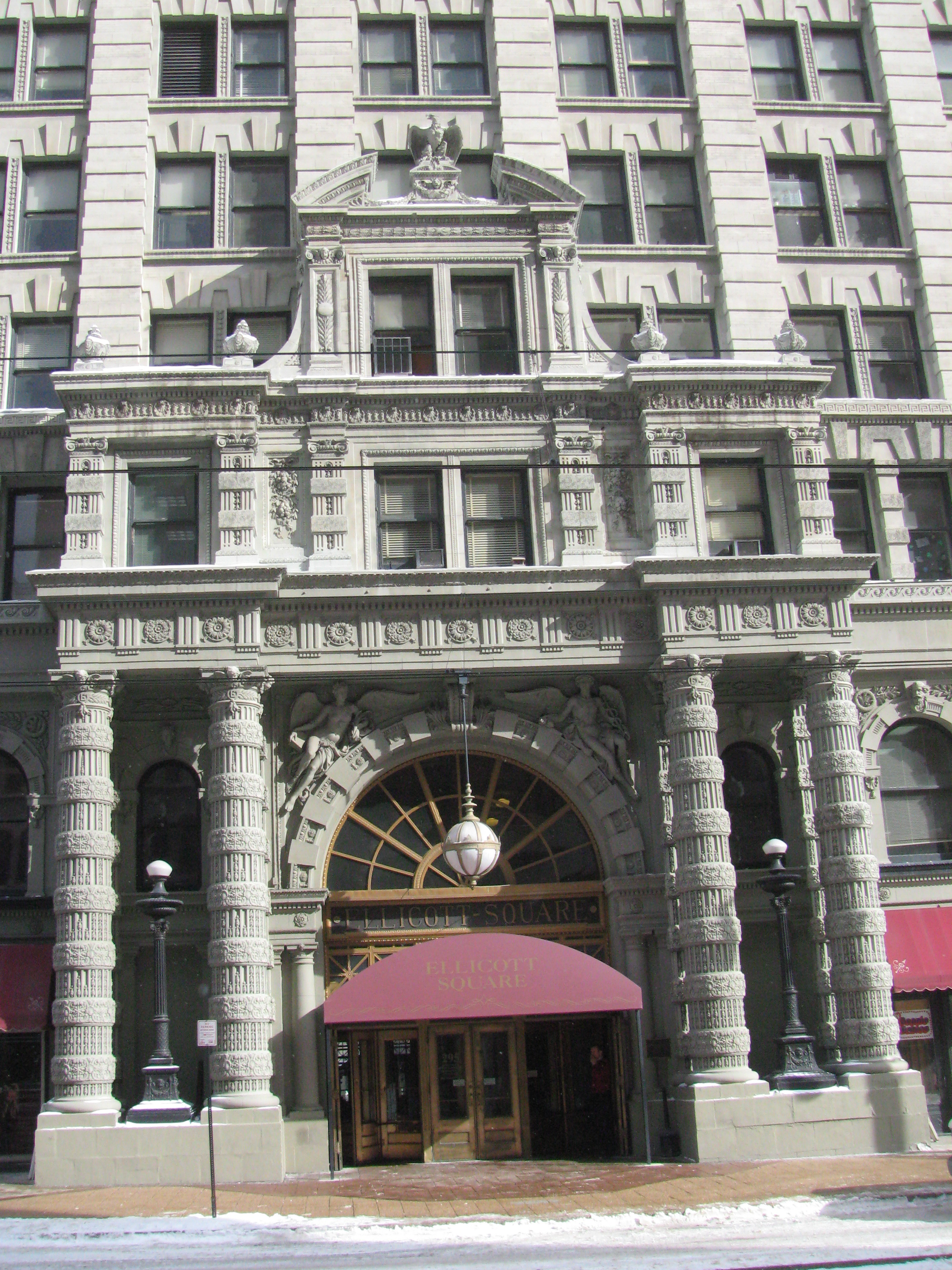
Ellicott Square Building from Main Street

The Ellicott Square Building was designed by Charles Atwood of D. H. Burnham & Company, and completed in May, 1896. At the time of its completion, it was the largest office building in the world. In 1896 and 1897, the building was the site of Edisonia Hall and the Vitascope Theater, the earliest known dedicated motion picture theater in the world.

At 10 stories high—with the capacity to support 10 more floors—and 447,000 square feet (41,500 m^{2}), the Ellicott Square Building was the largest office building in the world by floor area until 1908, with the opening of the Hudson Terminal buildings in New York City. It was built at a cost of $3.5 million in less than one year. The building was named after Joseph Ellicott, the planner and surveyor who laid out the then-village of Buffalo.

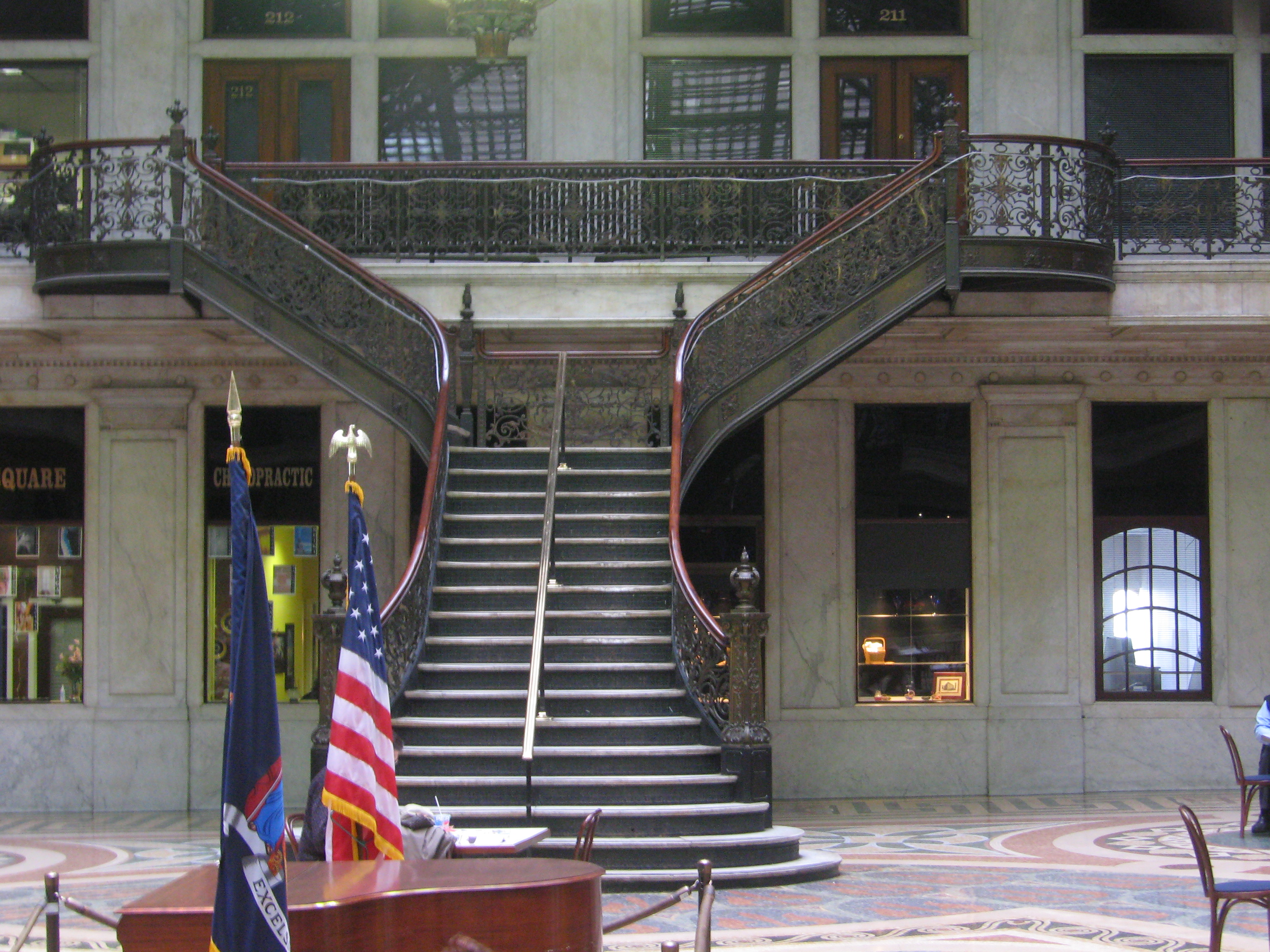
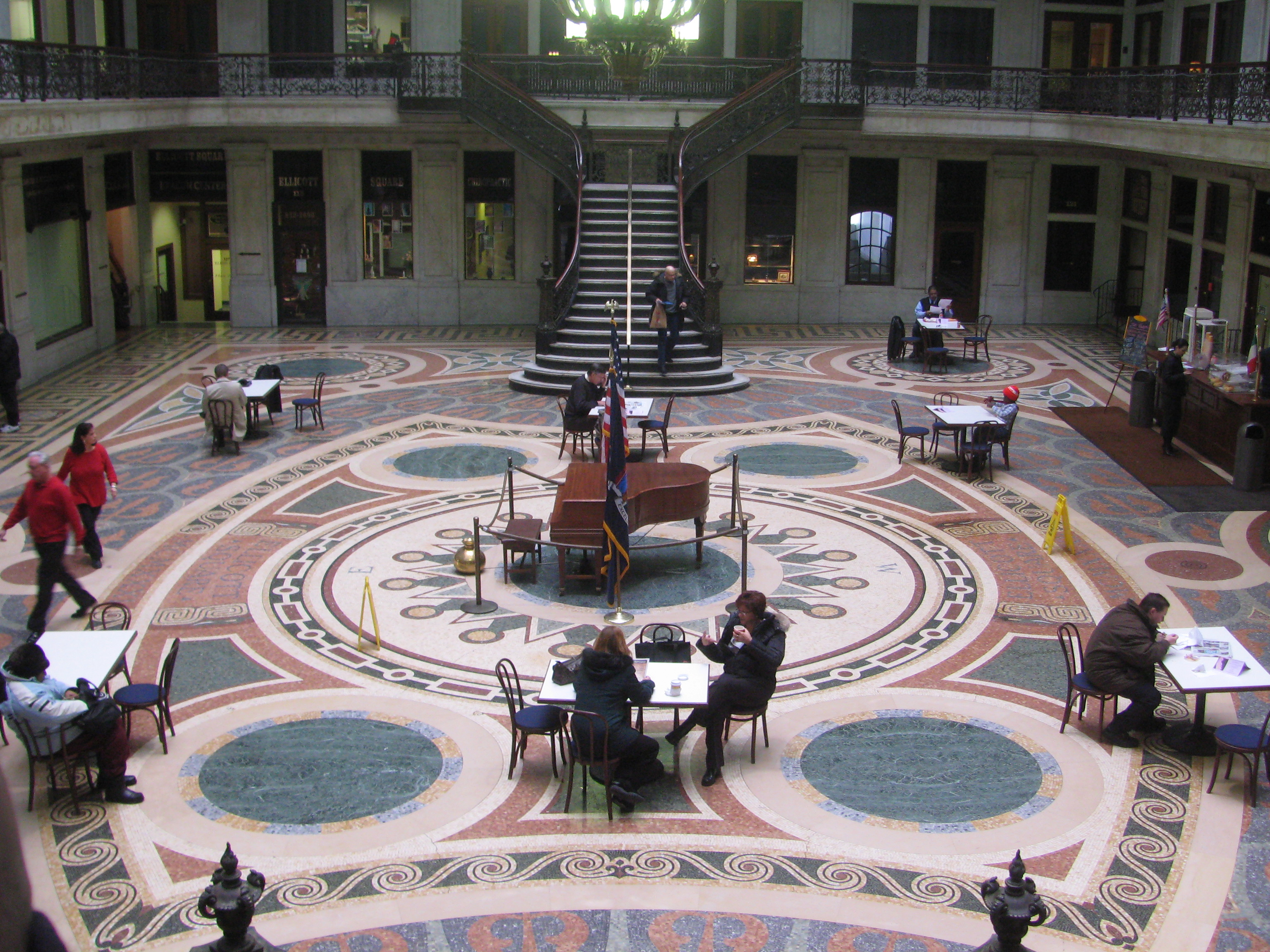
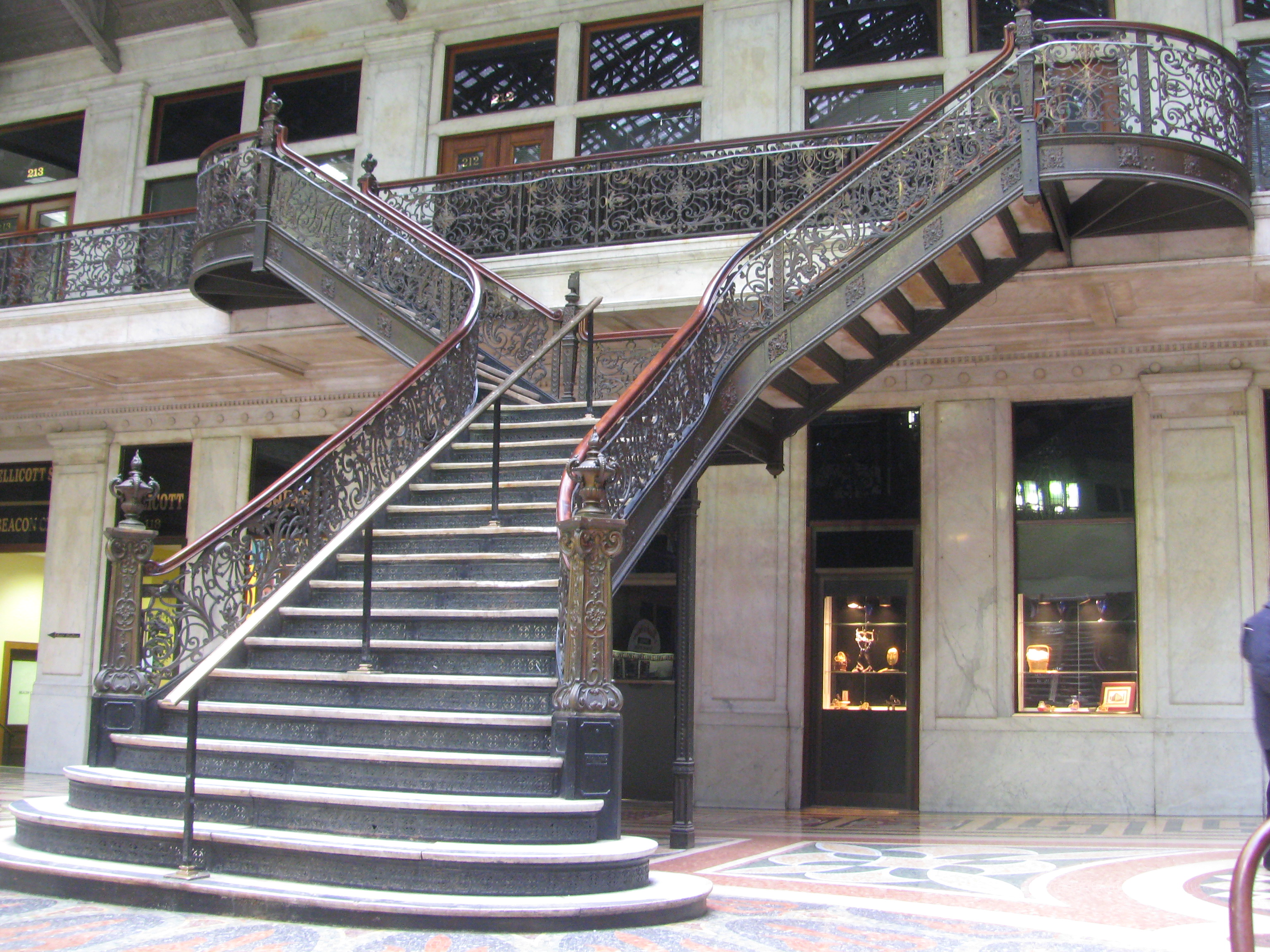
Ellicott Square Building interior court
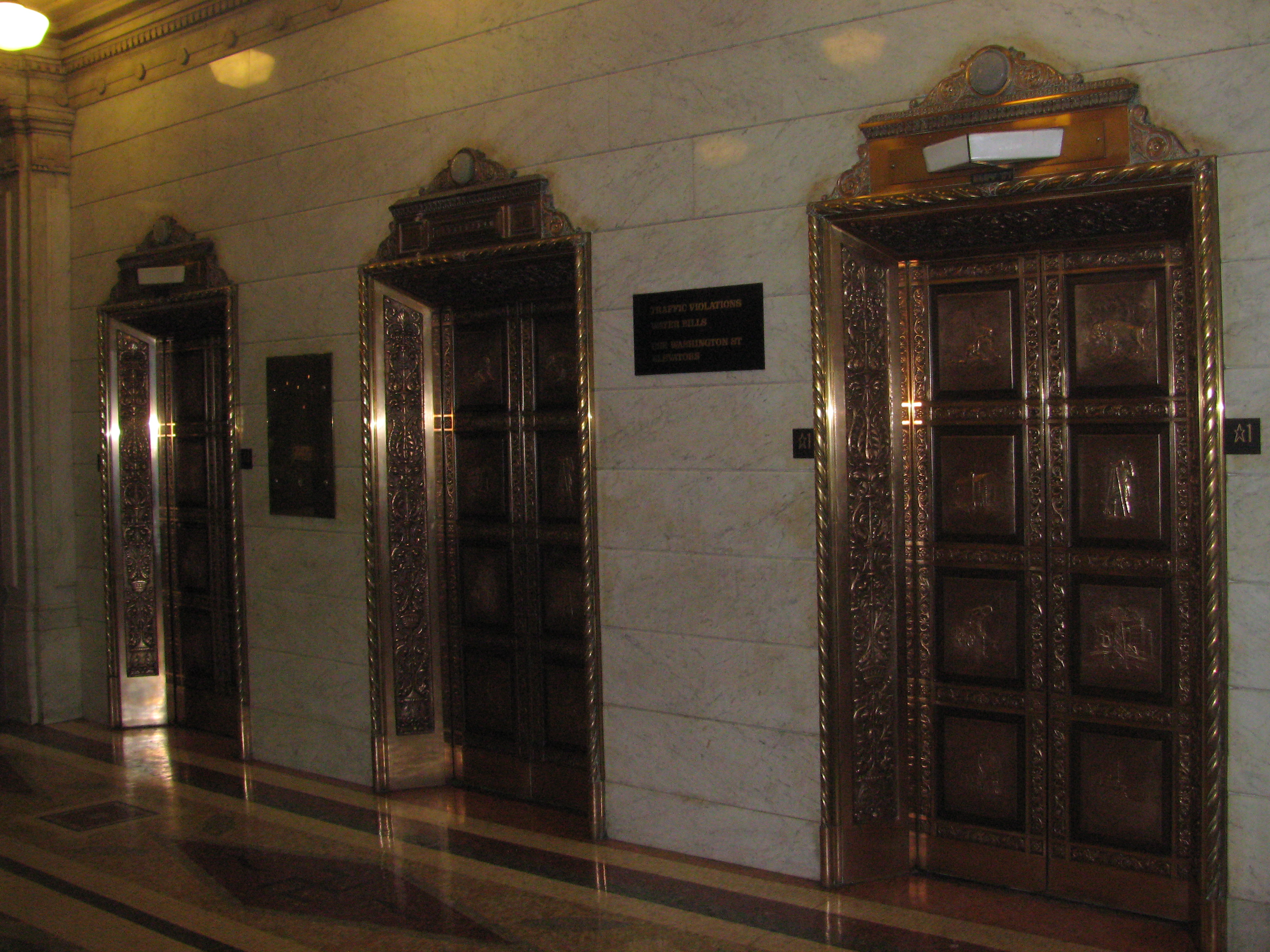
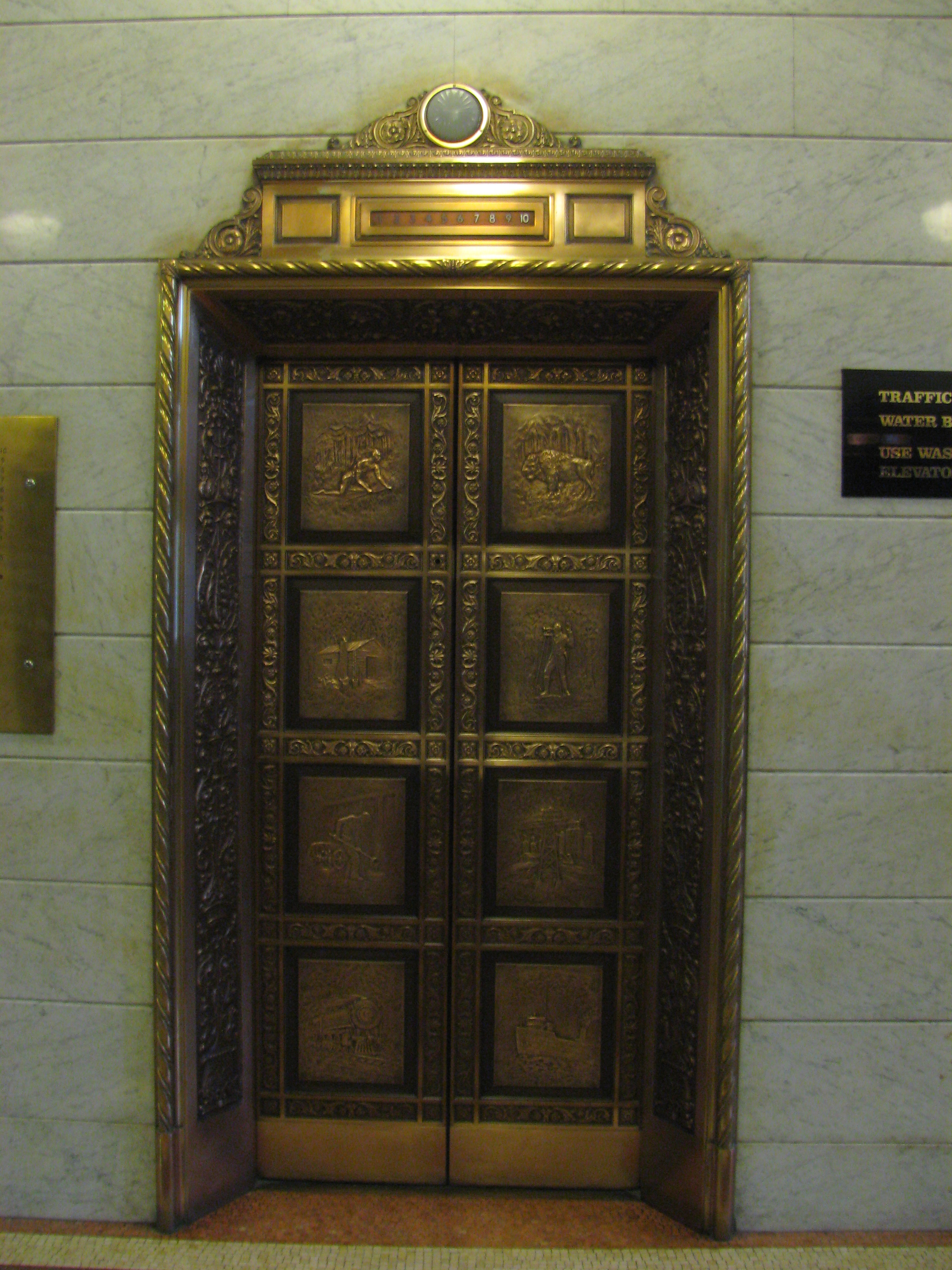
Ellicott Square Building first floor elevators

The mantra of architect Daniel Burnham was "make no little plans, they have no magic to stir men’s blood; think big." Built in the Italian Renaissance style, the exterior of the Ellicott Square Building is made of granite, iron, and terra cotta with a veneer of pearl gray brick. The majestic interior courtyard contains a marble mosaic floor designed by William Winthrop Kent and James A. Johnson. Imported from Italy, the 23 million pieces of marble on the mosaic depict sun symbols from civilizations around the world. The interior court resembles that of the Rookery Building in Chicago.

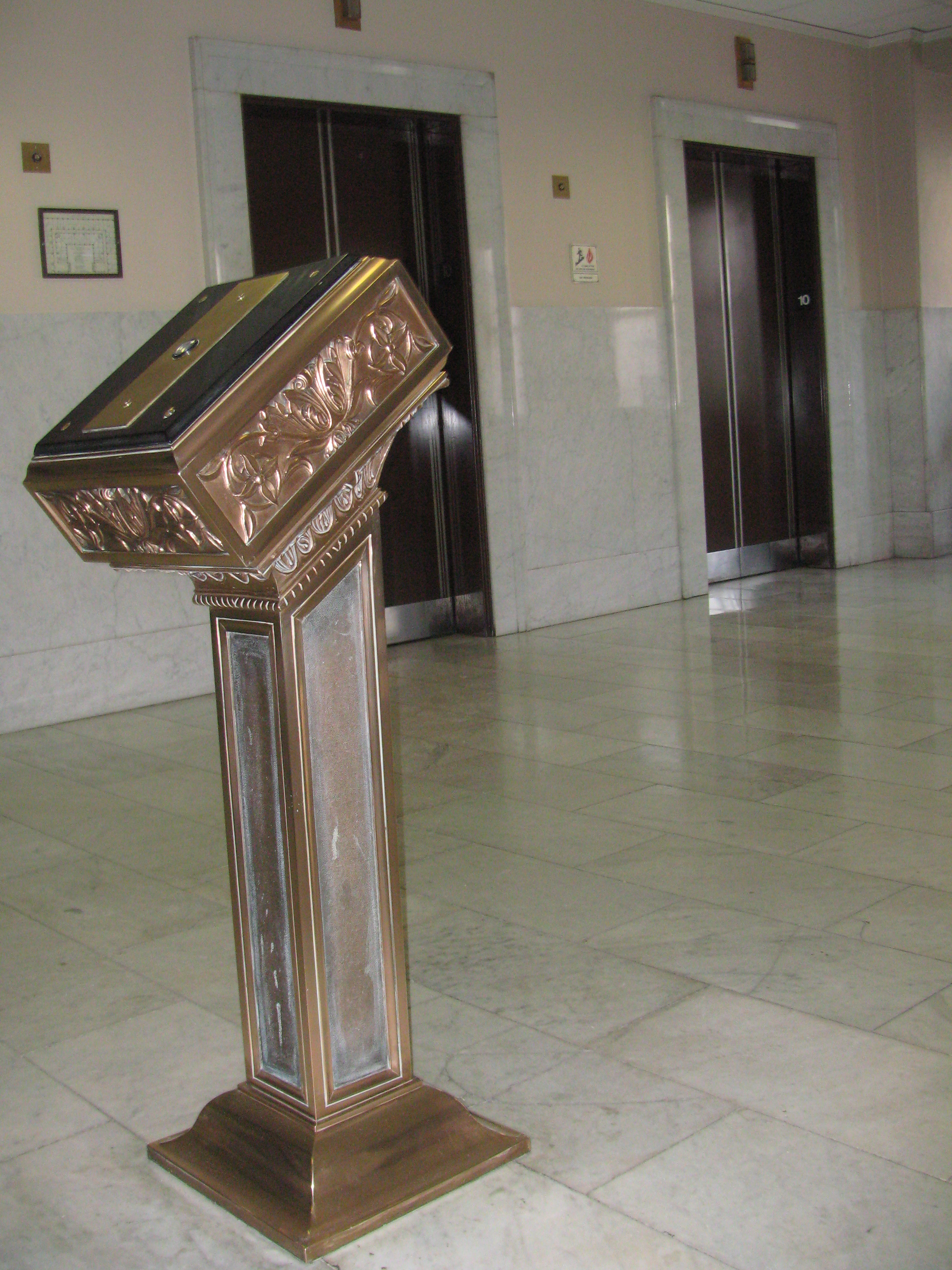
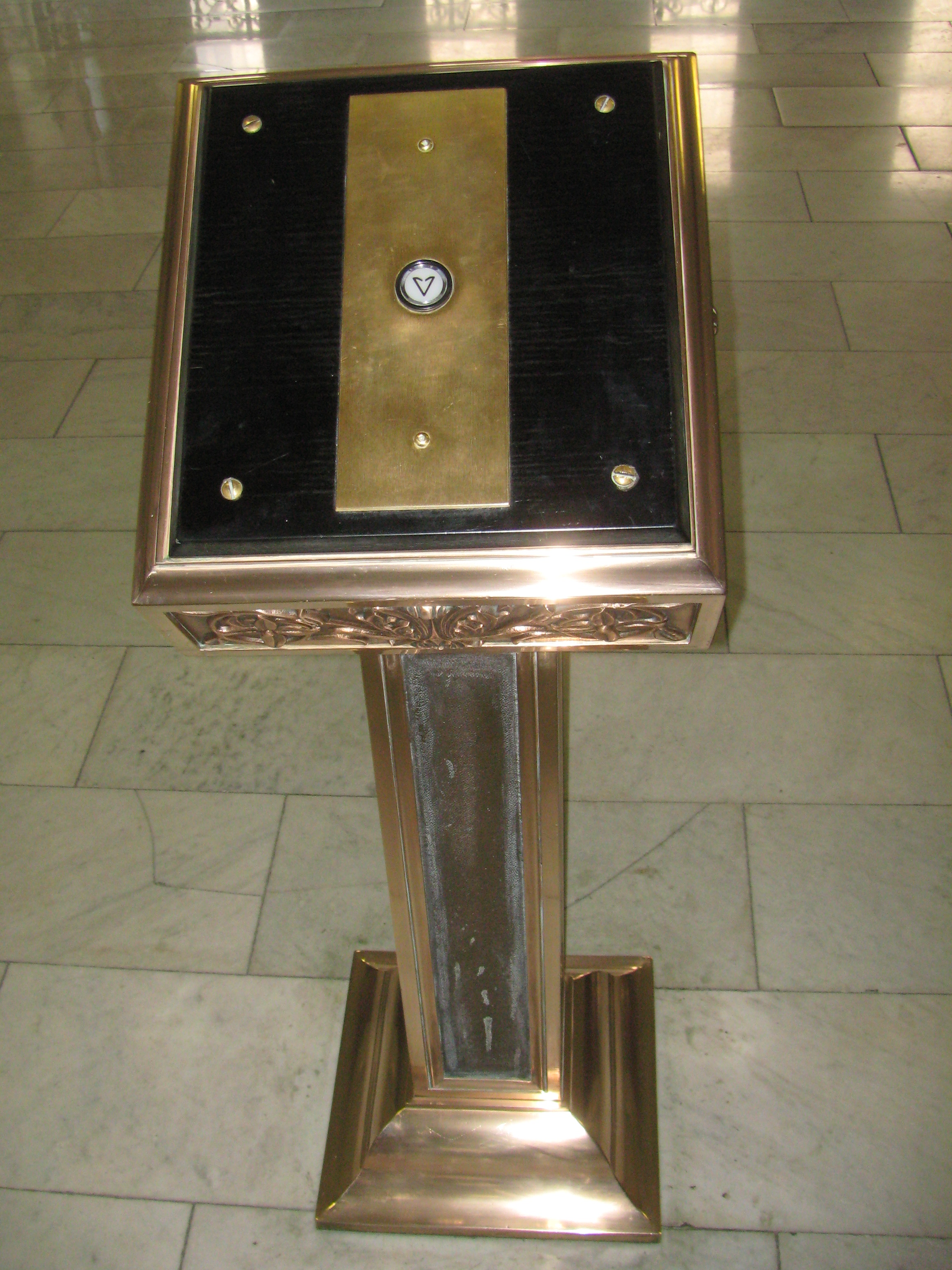
Ellicott Square Building tenth floor elevator buttons

There are broad stairs on either side and a glass roof in an ornamental steel frame provides natural light. The building features ornate glove lamps, intricate columns, carefully proportioned classical features gracing doorways, marble and brass to trim iron and stone.

The lobby of the Ellicott Square Building remains a favorite gathering spot for political rallies, weddings and social functions. In 1984 it was used for hotel scenes in the movie The Natural.

The terracotta cornice was removed in 1971, and, soon thereafter, most of the forty lion heads on the exterior were also removed.

The building is currently managed by Ellicott Development Co., the company founded and owned by Carl Paladino.

== See also ==
- List of tallest buildings in Buffalo, New York
