= Berkeley Apartments (Buffalo, New York) =

- U.S. National Register of Historic Places
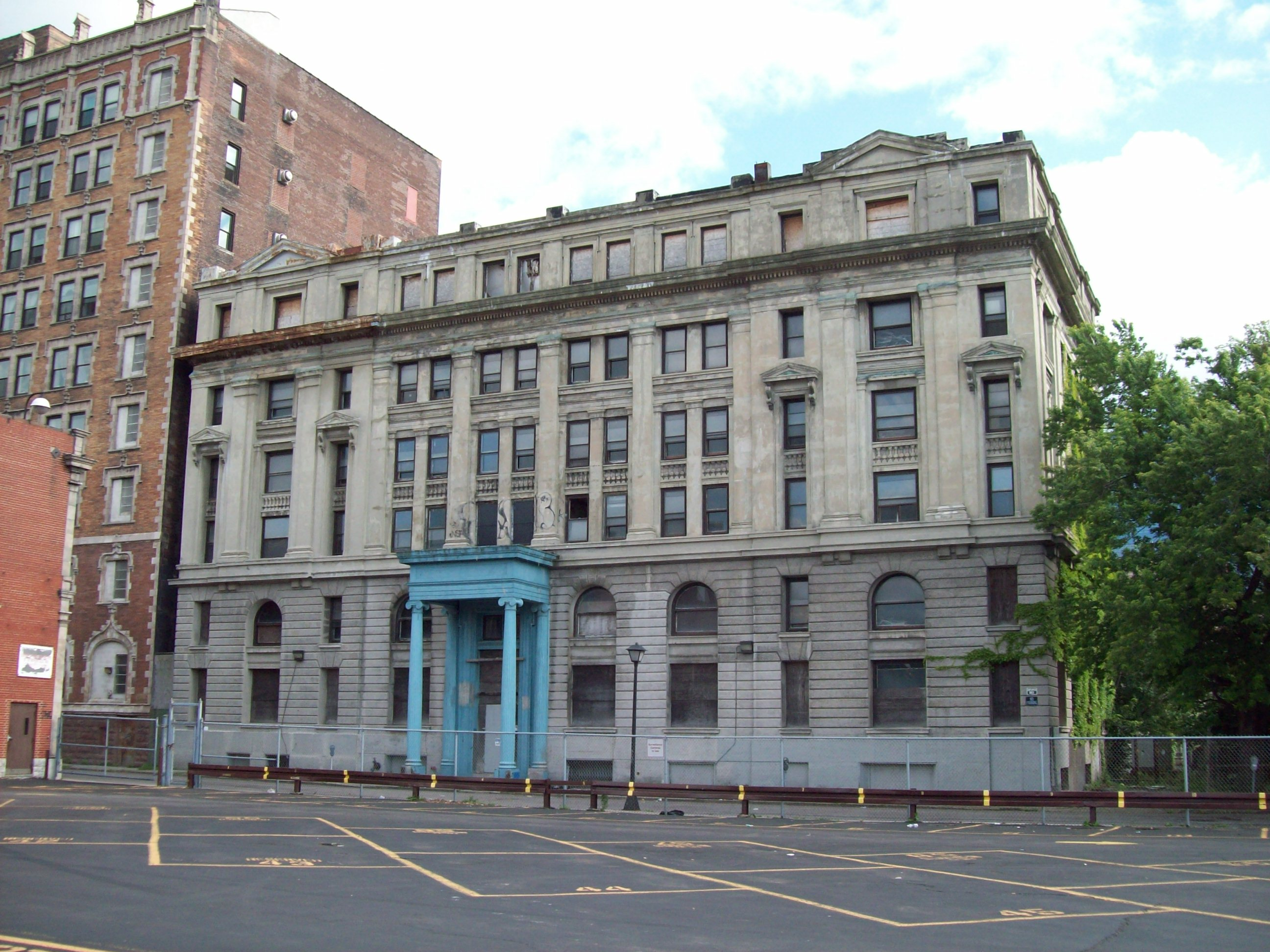
- Berkeley Apartments, Buffalo, NY, June 2009

- Location within New York Location within the United States
- Location: 24 Johnson Park, Buffalo, New York
- Coordinates: 42°53′31″N 78°52′35″W
- Built: 1894
- Architect: Strong, Carlton T.; Ransome, Ernest L.
- Architectural style: Late 19th And 20th Century Revivals, Italian Renaissance
- NRHP reference No.: 87001852
- Added to NRHP: October 15, 1987

Berkeley Apartments, also known as the Graystone Hotel (after 1912), is a historic apartment hotel building located at Buffalo in Erie County, New York.

== History ==
Berkeley Apartments was constructed between 1894 and 1897, and is one of the earliest examples of a large multistory building built of reinforced concrete. it was designed by local architect Carlton T. Strong and engineer Ernest L. Ransome. The building is in the Italian Renaissance style.

The six-story building hosted visitors to the Pan-American Exposition in the early 1900s. The building became vacant in the early 1990s after decades of decline. In 2002, Ellicott Development Co. purchased the hotel with plans to redevelop the property into a luxury apartment building. Those plans were halted in late 2003 after a large section of roof collapsed during interior demolition work. The building again sat idle until 2013 when work resumed. The building now houses 42 market-rate apartments.

It was listed on the National Register of Historic Places in 1987.

== See also ==
- Ellicott Development Co.
