= Fidelity Trust Building =

Coordinates: 42°52′56″N 78°52′33″W

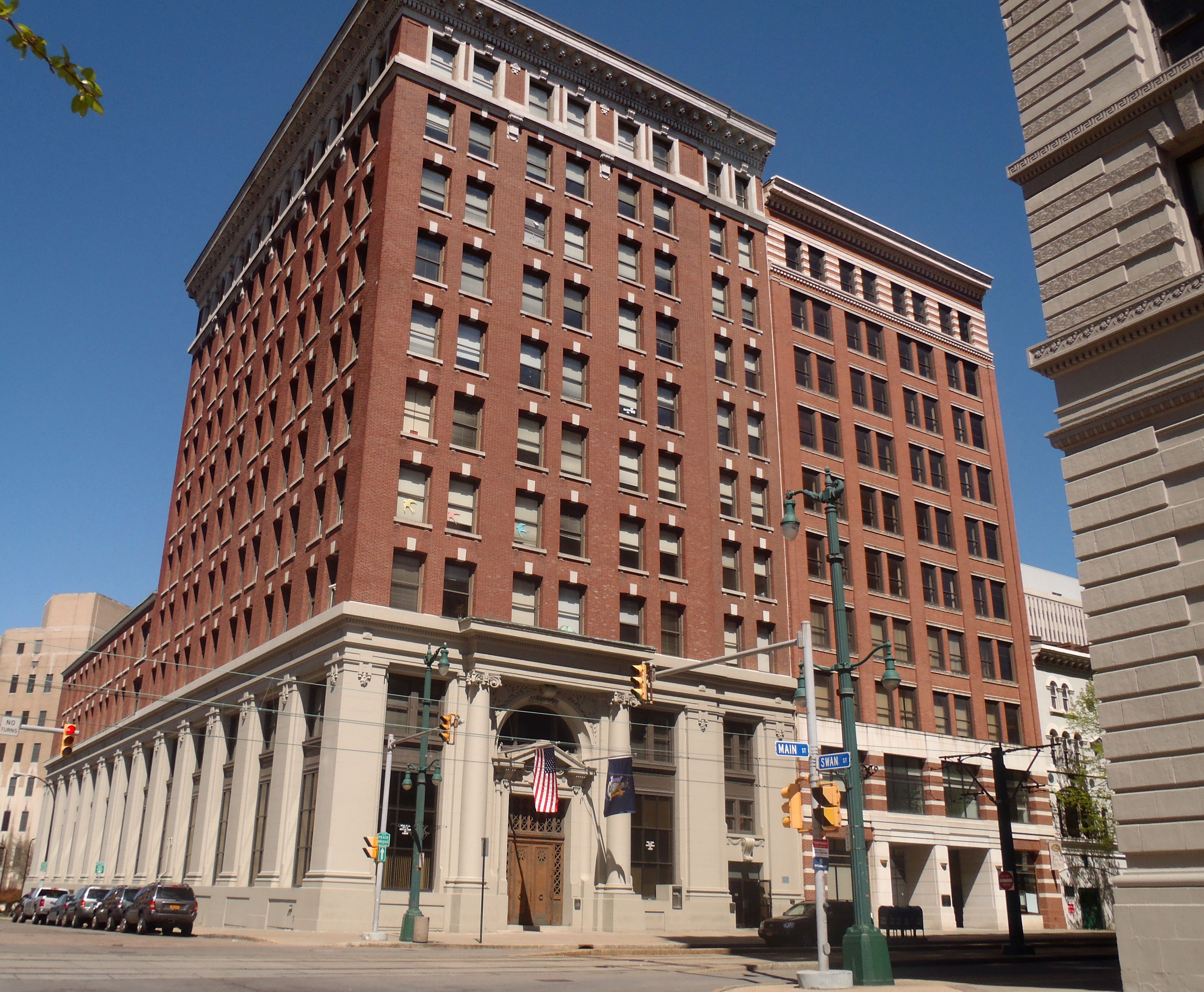
- Fidelity Trust Building (Swan Tower), in Buffalo, New York
- Interactive map of the Fidelity Trust Building area

General information
- Status: Completed
- Type: Office
- Architectural style: Renaissance Revival
- Location: 284 Main Street, Buffalo, NY, United States
- Completed: 1909
- Renovated: 1926
- Owner: Ellicott Development Co.

Technical details
- Floor count: 11

Design and construction
- Architects: Green & Wicks (1909); E. B. Green (1926)

The Fidelity Trust Building, also known as Swan Tower, is a 160,000-square-foot (15,000 m^{2}) commercial Renaissance Revival office building located at 284 Main Street in the Joseph Ellicott Historic District (also called the Downtown Historic District) in downtown Buffalo, New York.

== History ==
The site of the current building was once referred to as "The Weed Block", (located at Main & Swan) and was built in 1857. The block was home to Millard Fillmore's law office and other prominent Buffalo businessmen. In May 1893, John J. Albright, along with George V. Forman, John Satterfield, and Franklin D. Locke, founded The Fidelity Trust and Guaranty Company of Buffalo, New York. The block was demolished in 1901 to make room for the Fidelity Trust Building.

In 1909, the officers of the Fidelity Trust company commissioned Green & Wicks to build the Fidelity Trust Building. Anson Goodyear described George V. Forman in the following way: "every morning left his house at a certain hour and met George Williams at his house just above North Street, to walk to the Fidelity Building together. Mr. Forman boasted a very prominent corporation and leaned backward to achieve his balance. Mr. Williams was emaciated and bent forward to achieve his. It was a procession on which people checked their watches." In December 1925, the Fidelity Trust Company, with $35 million in assets, merged with Manufacturers and Traders Bank, founded in 1856, with $64 million in assets, under the new name Manufacturers and Traders Trust Company. The $100 million company was headed by Fidelity's President, 36-year-old Lewis G. Harriman. Harriman and a group of investors including A. H. Schoellkopf and James Forrestal, who would become the first United States Secretary of Defense, owned enough shares to control both Fidelity and M&T.

In 1926, the building was expanded with the addition of the west wing. E. B. Green completed the addition. The Fidelity Trust Building is adjacent to the White Building, a double sided building facing both Main and Erie streets, at 298 Main Street.

=== Subsequent use ===
The building was later called the M&T Building, and later still the NFTA Building. In 2011, the building was referred to by the owner since 1989, Ellicott Development Co., as "Swan Tower".

== Architectural features ==
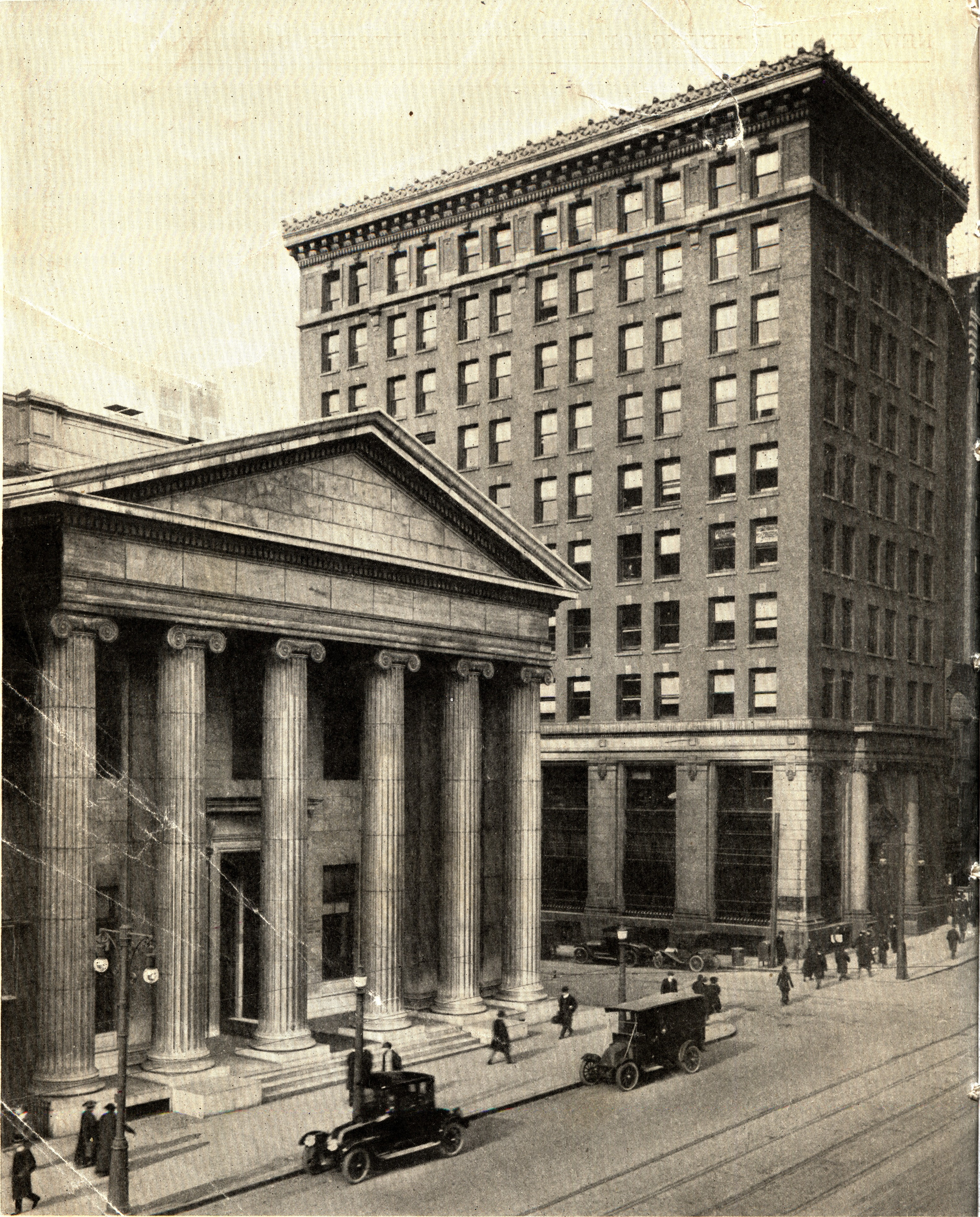
"Manufacturer's & Traders National Bank" on the left and "Fidelity Trust Company" on the right, 1916

The exterior of the building features many decorative details including: Leaf-and-dart molding with "F" (for Fidelity) carved in stone, a protruding cornice, block modillions, egg-and-dart molding, dentil molding, volutes in Roman Ionic columns, and bay leaves in spandrels. Above the entrance has fluted end brackets with guttae and dentils support broken pediment.

The interior of the building also features decorative details including: plaster ceiling ornamentation with arabesques, Corinthian capitals, brass acanthus vines and flowers, and brass guilloche.
