= Yehuda Levin =

American rabbi (born 1954)

Rabbi Yehuda Levin
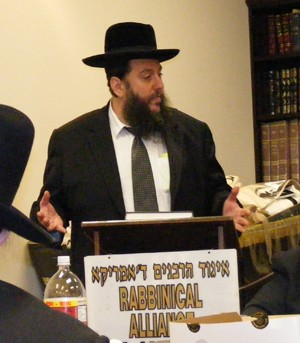
- Hosting a conference of the Igud Harabbonim

Religious life
- Religion: Judaism
- Denomination: Haredi ("Ultra-Orthodox") Judaism

Lew Y. Levin or Yehuda Levin (born 1954) is a Brooklyn, New York-based Haredi rabbi and conservative activist known for his endorsing of hard-right Republican Party political candidates, and his vocal opposition to same-sex marriage, feminism, and abortion. He has run for elective office several times, but has lost each time.

== Beliefs and political activities ==
Levin is a vocal religious conservative, and opposes LGBT rights and abortion.

Levin is a member of the advisory committee of Jews Against Anti-Christian Defamation, a US-based Jewish group dedicated to fighting discrimination directed against Christians, and tends to be in alliance with Christian evangelicals on efforts opposed to LGBTQ rights and other social issues. This led to his 1996 support for Pat Buchanan.

Levin has run for public office numerous times. He ran for Congress in 1984 on the Republican ticket, for mayor of New York City in 1985 on the Right to Life ticket, and for New York City Council in 1991 and 1993 on the Conservative ticket. He was unsuccessful in each of these elections.

Levin was involved in stopping a gay pride event from taking place in Jerusalem.

In October 2010, Levin worked with Carl Paladino to prepare a homophobic statement that Paladino read at a meeting of New York Orthodox groups, which made national news. Paladino later apologized for that statement, causing Levin to withdraw his support from Paladino.

Levin is often noted in popular culture for his strong anti-gay statements, most notably his statement blaming the 2010 Haiti earthquake on the presence of homosexuals in the military. Levin posted a video onto YouTube the same day as 2011 Virginia earthquake in which he said, "The Talmud states, "You have shaken your male member in a place where it doesn't belong." I too, will shake the Earth." He said that homosexuals shouldn't take it personally: "We don't hate homosexuals. I feel bad for homosexuals. It's a revolt against God, and, literally, there's hell to pay."

=== Endorsements ===
Levin supported Randall Terry's bid to run as a Democrat in 2012 for President of the United States.

== Praise and criticism ==
Levin, a student of Avigdor Miller, has received praise by Orthodox rabbis for defending tradition. Nevertheless, some Orthodox rabbis and community leaders from Ashkenazic and Hasidic communities have responded negatively to Levin. Levin has also received support from some conservative Catholics for causes relevant to the World Congress of Families.
