= Carl Paladino =

American businessman and political activist

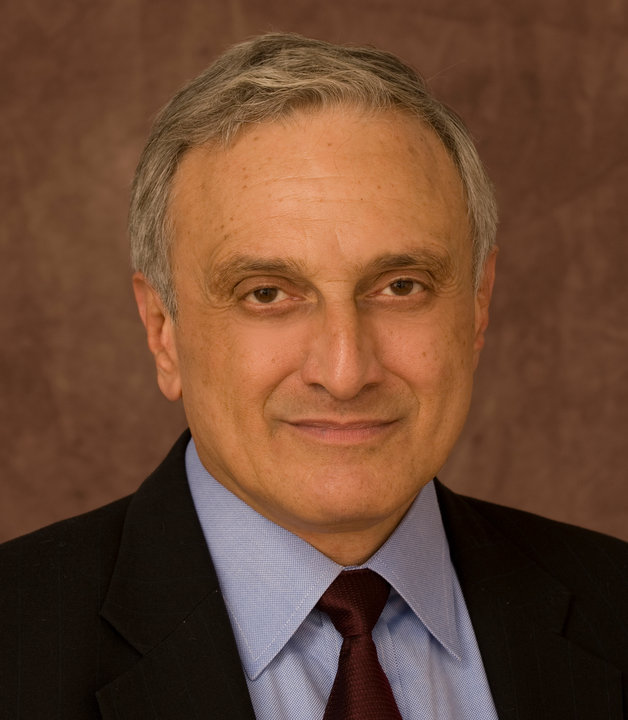

Member of the Buffalo Public Schools Board of Education from the Park District
- In office July 2013 – August 2017
- Preceded by: Louis Petrucci
- Succeeded by: Catherine Flanagan-Priore

Personal details
- Born: Carl Pasquale Paladino; August 24, 1946 (age 80) Buffalo, New York, U.S.
- Party: Republican (2005–present)
- Other political affiliations: Democratic (before 2005)
- Relatives: Brian Higgins (cousin-in-law)
- Education: St. Bonaventure University (BA); Syracuse University (JD)

Carl Pasquale Paladino (born August 24, 1946) is an American businessman and political activist. Paladino is the chairman of Ellicott Development Co., a real estate development company he founded in 1973.

Paladino ran for Governor of New York in the 2010 election. He upset Rick Lazio in the Republican primary, but was defeated by Democrat Andrew Cuomo (63%–33%) in the general election. Paladino's candidacy was supported by the Tea Party movement and by residents of his native Western New York.

Paladino was elected to the South Buffalo seat on the Buffalo School Board in 2013, and was re-elected in 2016. In December 2016, the board condemned racist remarks that Paladino had made about President Barack Obama and First Lady Michelle Obama and demanded that he resign. On August 17, 2017, following a public hearing, the New York State Education Department removed Paladino from his board seat for publicly disclosing confidential information obtained in executive session. Paladino was a candidate for the U.S. House of Representatives for New York’s 23rd District in 2022 but narrowly lost in the Republican primary to Nick Langworthy.

== Early life, education, and career ==
Paladino's parents emigrated from Italy to the United States. His father participated in the Civilian Conservation Corps in the 1930s. He was raised in the Lovejoy District of Buffalo and attended Bishop Timon – St. Jude High School in South Buffalo. Paladino graduated from St. Bonaventure University for his B.A. and from the Syracuse University College of Law. He received his Juris Doctor degree in 1971. He spent three months on active duty in the United States Army and over ten years in the reserve, discharged in 1981 at the rank of captain. Paladino founded Ellicott Development Co. in 1973; the company buys properties, builds stores, and leases them to national retail outlets and government agencies. He later was part of the consortium that acquired the Fort Erie Race Track in Canada in August 2014.

Paladino is close friends with pizzeria owner Joseph Todaro Jr. and has denied the existence of an Italian organized crime syndicate in Buffalo. In response to allegations of an Italian mafia in Buffalo, Paladino stated in 2023: "There's no mob in Buffalo, and I know everybody. It's all a fantasy."

== Political career ==
=== Early political activity ===
Paladino registered with the Democratic Party in 1974 and remained with it until 2005. Later that year, after the retirement of Buffalo mayor Anthony Masiello, Paladino enrolled in the Republican Party. Paladino and several limited partnerships controlled by him have donated to numerous political candidates and organizations, both Democratic and Republican. During his time as a Democrat, he generally considered himself a conservative Reagan Democrat in the mold of former Buffalo Mayor James D. Griffin and former New York Governor Hugh Carey.

Paladino helped lead a campaign to remove the toll barriers on Interstate 190 in the mid-2000s. After finding a state law that required the state to remove the tolls once the bonds for that portion of the thruway had been paid off (which took place in 1996), Paladino threatened to sue. The Thruway Authority removed the tolls.

In 2009, Paladino got involved in the campaign on behalf of South Buffalo councilman Michael Kearns in Buffalo's Democratic primary mayoral election, campaigning against incumbent Byron Brown. He also endorsed Kearns in the New York State Assembly race in 2012 to replace Buffalo city comptroller Mark J. F. Schroeder.

=== 2010 campaign for Governor of New York ===
On April 5, 2010, Paladino officially entered the race for Governor of New York. Tom Ognibene, the former minority leader of the New York City Council, was his chosen running mate. Michael Caputo was Paladino's campaign manager. Roger Stone acted as a supporter and advisor for the campaign, recommending Caputo to Paladino. Tom Golisano, an American businessman and philanthropist who ran three gubernatorial campaigns on third-party lines, also advised the campaign. Paladino ran as a pugnacious political outsider with the support of the Tea Party movement. His campaign website frequently referenced a line from the 1976 film Network: "'I'm mad as hell and I'm not going to take it anymore'".

Paladino pledged himself to one term in office and, like fellow businessmen-turned-politicians Chris Collins and Michael Bloomberg, would forgo collecting his salary if elected. He stated that he would then endorse his lieutenant governor for the 2014 gubernatorial election.

With regard to a planned Islamic community center two blocks from the site of the September 11, 2001, attacks on New York City, in late July 2010, Paladino issued a radio ad which stated, "As Governor, I will use the power of eminent domain to stop this mosque and make the site a war memorial instead of a monument to those who attacked our country." He added that the mosque should not be built within a range of "the dust cloud containing human remains [of the 9/11 victims] traveled".

In April 2010, a local progressive Web site released a series of racially charged and sexually explicit e-mails that purported to be from Paladino. Paladino acknowledged some of them were indeed circulated by him among a circle of friends, mostly in the construction industry. Campaign manager Michael Caputo initially stated that the authenticity of some of the e-mails could not be verified and continued to maintain that the e-mails were "of questionable origin"; the site themselves could not identify the anonymous source of the e-mails and was only able to verify them through a series of cc: addresses included with the package of e-mails. Paladino acknowledged that some of the e-mails were authentic, but denied that he originated any of them, saying that he was nevertheless "somewhat careless" about forwarding them to others. Paladino admitted many of these emails were "off-color" and could be considered offensive, took responsibility for them, and apologized.

Paladino vied with Rick Lazio, Steve Levy, and Myers Mermel for the Republican nomination. At the state Republican convention, Paladino received 8 percent of the weighted vote, falling short of the 25 percent needed for automatic ballot access. Paladino then submitted 28,000 signatures in an effort to petition his way onto the Republican primary ballot. Paladino's petitions were sufficient to qualify him for the primary.

Paladino originally planned to seek the nomination of the Conservative Party of New York but dropped out because party chairman Michael Long allowed him only two minutes of speech time to make his case. The Conservative Party's nomination went to Rick Lazio. Paladino supporter Ralph Lorigo acted as a placeholder at the convention, joining forces with Steve Levy's supporters.

Paladino held a two-week boat tour at the end of May 2010 along the Erie Canal to learn more about the rest of upstate New York. He began a television and radio advertising campaign in July of that year, including local TV stations as well as national ads on the Fox News Channel. He frequently called for debates, first with Lazio (who declined) and then with Cuomo. Paladino said he might be willing to spend more than $10,000,000 (10 million) of his own wealth on the campaign.

Paladino founded the "Taxpayers Party", which also fielded David Malpass and Gary Berntsen as U.S. Senate candidates; both dropped out of their races, leading the party to nominate Joseph J. DioGuardi as Malpass's replacement and Rus Thompson for comptroller. Paladino's campaign submitted 30,000 signatures for the Taxpayers line on August 10, 2010. Other potential candidates for state office indicated interest, and several state legislature candidates filed petitions under the "Taxpayers" banner to be on their ballot.

In the Republican primary election on September 14, 2010, Paladino, with heavy support in his native Western New York, defeated Lazio. In the primary for lieutenant governor, however, Ognibene, who had been selected by Paladino, lost to Lazio's choice, Greg Edwards. The Paladino-Edwards ticket competed in November against Democrat Andrew Cuomo and his running mate, Robert Duffy, as well as several minor-party candidates.

Lazio defeated Lorigo in the Conservative primary by a 60–40 margin, only to drop out two weeks later. Long later indicated he would endorse Paladino and encourage his allies to nominate him as Lazio's replacement. Lazio was nominated by the Bronx Republican Party for a state Supreme Court judgeship, legally enabling him to be removed from the Conservative line as a gubernatorial candidate.

In a statement to Politico on September 29, 2010, Paladino asked why the media was concerned with any of his extramarital affairs, and not asking similar questions of Andrew Cuomo. Paladino later said he did not know of any actual affairs of Cuomo, and that the implication was not intended.

In October 2010, Paladino was criticized for anti-gay remarks he made to Orthodox rabbis in Borough Park, Brooklyn. The speech was discovered to have been prepared by Rabbi Yehuda Levin. Paladino apologized for his comments, saying that "The portrayal of me as anti-gay is inconsistent with my lifelong beliefs and actions and my prior history as a father, employer and friend to many in the gay and lesbian community." The following day, Paladino said he meant what he had said, but regretted not wording it differently. In response to this apology, Rabbi Levin rescinded his endorsement of Paladino.

Regarding the controversies, Paladino said: "This the first time I have ever run for public office and yes, I let things get out of hand. It's my responsibility. Nobody else's. I have also learned what monsters the press can be."

==== Results ====
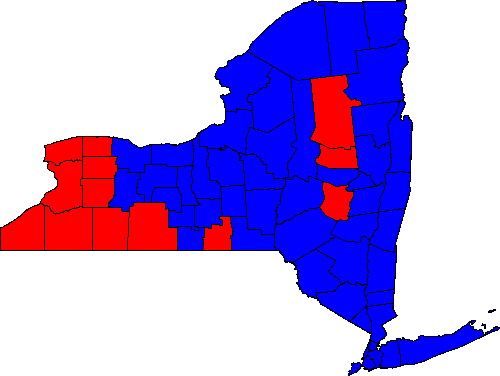
County results of the 2010 election, with counties won by Paladino in red

Paladino was defeated by Cuomo in the general election, 63%–33%. Paladino won all eight counties in the Buffalo media market but only a few counties outside of that region, all of which were rural upstate counties. Paladino did help the Conservative Party gain third place on the ballot for the first time since losing the line in 1998. The Taxpayers line failed to achieve 50,000 votes, in part due to poor ballot location (the line was last on the ballot and on most ballots was placed in a second column).

Paladino's strong showing in the west propelled Erie County into first place in the New York Republican Party's vote weighting; following the election, its votes would count 11.53% in state party votes, up from the previous 6.98%. After the election, Paladino said this was the last time he would run as a candidate for governor.

=== Buffalo School Board (2013–2017) ===
In February 2013, Paladino announced his candidacy for the South Buffalo seat on the school board of Buffalo Public Schools. A longtime vocal critic of the school board, Paladino chose to run in opposition to teachers union head Phil Rumore and superintendent Pamela Brown, whose hiring (as well as every other non-interim superintendent hire in the past two decades) Paladino has speculated was at least partially motivated by race. In the May 2013 election, Paladino defeated Adrian Harris by a 4 to 1 margin, and was sworn in on July 1.

In May 2016, Paladino won re-election to the School Board; he defeated 18-year-old Austin Harig of South Buffalo, a Hutchinson Central Technical High School senior. Paladino won by 132 votes. Although Paladino won reelection, several of his allies on the board lost re-election, and Paladino went from being part of a 5–4 majority to being part of a 6–3 minority. Harig won the support of the Buffalo Teachers Federation and AFL–CIO, while Paladino received the endorsement of The Buffalo News editorial board, which wrote: "Despite all his defects – his offensive comments, his bullying, his sometime inability to function effectively on the board – it is because of his influence that the board is even interested in turning around an underperforming district."

==== Remarks about the Obamas and removal from the Board ====
On December 23, 2016, Paladino took part in an interview with alternative weekly newspaper Artvoice. When asked what he would like to see happen in 2017, Paladino replied it was President Barack Obama dying of mad cow disease, stating: "Obama catches mad cow disease after being caught having relations with a Her[e]ford. He dies before his trial and is buried in a cow pasture next to [senior White House advisor] Valerie Jarret[t], who died weeks prior, after being convicted of sedition and treason, when a Jihady [sic] cell mate mistook her for being a nice person and decapitated her." After then being asked "what he would most like to see go in 2017", he replied: "Michelle Obama. I'd like her to return to being a male and let loose in the outback of Zimbabwe where she lives comfortably in a cave with Maxie, the gorilla."

The statements sparked immediate backlash and outrage. New York Governor Andrew Cuomo released a statement calling Paladino's remarks "racist, ugly, reprehensible remarks," while Buffalo School Board president Barbara Nevergold called for Paladino to be ousted from his position, arguing that if a student had made Paladino's comments on social media, they would have been suspended. Erie County Executive Mark Poloncarz called for Paladino to resign and Trump's transition team called his comments "absolutely reprehensible".

On December 23, Paladino was contacted by The Buffalo News, who inquired whether he really made the comments. Paladino replied "of course I did" and told the editors to "go fuck themselves" for making the inquiry. Paladino later posted a "defiant" apology on Facebook.

On December 28, the school board demanded Paladino's ouster in a resolution signed by six members of the nine-member board. The resolution stated: "These unambiguously racist, morally repugnant, flagrantly disrespectful, inflammatory and inexcusable comments by Mr. Paladino have garnered both local, national, and international attention that reflects negatively on the Buffalo Board of Education, the City of Buffalo and its leadership and its citizens." The resolution called upon State Education Commissioner MaryEllen Elia to remove Paladino if he refused to resign. Under state law, the Education Commissioner may remove a board member from office for a violation of the law or willful neglect of duty; the board argues that Paladino's statement violates the Dignity for All Students Act, "which requires school districts to provide students with an environment free of discrimination, harassment and bullying."

Subsequently, four groups filed separate petitions to Elia to remove Paladino from office: (1) the school board; (2) the teachers' union (the Buffalo Teachers Federation and the New York State United Teachers); the (3) Buffalo Parent-Teacher Organization and Buffalo NAACP chapter; and (4) the District Parent Coordinating Council. Two petitions also sought, as an interim measure, the immediate suspension of Paladino's functions as a board member. Several of the petitions argue for Paladino's removal on the basis of his public sharing of information discussed in executive session related to negotiations for a new contract with Buffalo teachers.

In February 2017, Elia declined to immediately suspend Paladino from the board, as the State Education Department continued to review the petitions seeking Paladino's permanent removal. In April 2017, Paladino filed papers with the commissioner seeking a delay in the administrative hearings against him while he pursues a lawsuit claiming a conspiracy to remove him from the school board. Demonstrators continued to advocate for Paladino's removal.

After the public hearing, Elia announced Paladino's removal from the board on August 17, 2017, effective immediately, citing the violation of executive session rules.

=== Other political activity ===
Paladino lives in New York's 27th congressional district, and said he was considering a run in New York's 26th congressional district special election, 2011; instead, he later endorsed eventual Republican nominee Jane Corwin, who lost to Kathleen Hochul.

In October 2011, Paladino filed a lawsuit against National Grid and Verizon (the primary electric and telephone utilities in Western New York, respectively) for what he alleged were exorbitant fees which the two companies charged for services. He alleged that the New York State Public Service Commission failed to prevent "collusion, overbilling, mis-billing and fraud."

Paladino filed a lawsuit against Buffalo Public Schools in July 2012, citing abuse of executive session and lack of transparency in the process of awarding a contract to the district's new superintendent. The lawsuit was thrown out of court within a week of its filing; Paladino said he would appeal the decision.

Paladino endorsed Newt Gingrich in the 2012 presidential election and campaigned for him in New Hampshire. He also campaigned for Gingrich in New York; Paladino's impact was noted in Niagara, Cattaraugus and Wyoming Counties, counties that Paladino had carried in 2010; Gingrich, despite no longer being a serious contender for the nomination, polled strongly enough to prevent Romney (who was already the presumptive nominee at the time) from gaining a majority in those counties.

Paladino made endorsements in the New York State senate elections, selecting three primary opponents against incumbent Republicans: Kevin Stocker against Mark Grisanti, Neil DeCarlo against Stephen Saland, and Johnny Destino against George Maziarz. All three candidates lost.

Paladino endorsed Donald Trump in the 2016 presidential election and was the New York co-chair of Trump's campaign. Paladino aggressively pushed and threatened Republicans in New York's delegation to Congress and the State Legislature to support Trump, writing in an open letter: "This is our last request that you join 'Trump for President' and try to preserve what's left of your pathetic careers in government." Paladino did not donate any money to Trump's campaign by late August 2016.

In 2018, Paladino stated intentions on Twitter to run for Congress to represent New York's 27th congressional district, after the incumbent representative Chris Collins stated he would withdraw from the ballot that year in response to Federal charges of corruption. When Collins reversed his decision a few weeks later and remained in the race, Paladino did not proceed and instead endorsed Collins.

Paladino endorsed incumbent Democrat Byron Brown in the 2021 Buffalo mayoral election. After Brown was defeated by socialist challenger India Walton in the Democratic primary, Paladino expressed support for Brown to continue his campaign as a write-in candidate; if Brown declined to do so, Paladino stated he was willing to launch such a write-in campaign for himself (neither the Republican nor Conservative Parties, by that point the only parties with ballot access, put forth a candidate). Paladino rescinded his endorsement in August, instead advising voters to not vote for anyone.

=== 2022 Congressional campaign ===
After keeping a relatively low profile since being removed from the Buffalo School Board, Paladino ran in the 2022 primary for the US House seat from New York's 23rd district, after incumbent Chris Jacobs announced his retirement. Paladino was considered the frontrunner, but outside spending on negative advertisements and multiple controversial comments led to his lead's evaporation. Paladino's campaign used his trademark "Carl Country" signs. Paladino lost the primary to former ally Nick Langworthy, despite support from Elise Stefanik. Paladino had expressed interest in a 2024 rematch.

==== Intentional employment of convicted pedophile ====
For the 2022 campaign, the New York Post reported that Paladino employed a known, convicted pedophile that was sentenced for possessing and promoting child pornography as the assistant treasurer of his campaign. The individual is reportedly listed on the NY State Sex Offender registry. Paladino confirmed to the Post that he employed the convicted individual, who he called a "good man," for decades and gave him a "second chance" after his conviction. Following the report and Paladino's personal confirmation of his employment, the campaign spokesman then claimed without evidence that the convicted pedophile was not employed by the campaign.

== Political positions ==
=== Abortion ===
Paladino is anti-abortion and favors adoption over abortion including in cases of rape or incest. Abortion would not be a legislative priority if he were to be elected, but he would continue to personally advocate against abortion. He opposes allowing minors to abort a pregnancy without the permission or notification of the minor's parents; he has also castigated lawmakers who have voted in favor of allowing late-term abortions past 24 weeks.

=== COVID-19 restrictions ===
He opposes most social distancing efforts related to the COVID-19 pandemic, believing they have destroyed small businesses and were an overreaction to a virus he recognizes as serious. Paladino himself contracted the virus through unknown community spread and was briefly hospitalized with mild pneumonia in early September 2020 but has since recovered; he has not changed his stance.

=== Compulsory military service ===
Paladino supports compulsory military service of one year for all biological males 18 years of age or older or after high school graduation, for a minimum of one year. He supports exempting all women from this mandate.

=== Environment ===
Paladino states that he was firmly in favor of drilling in the Marcellus Formation.

=== Firearms ===
Paladino, who has a handgun permit and "carries wherever it is legal", is strongly in favor of firearm ownership and Second Amendment rights; he seeks to repeal the New York State Assault Weapon Ban. He has participated in rallies against the NY SAFE Act. In June 2022, Paladino shared and then deleted a conspiracy-laden Facebook post suggesting the racist mass shooting in Buffalo was part of a plot to take away people's guns.

=== Fiscal issues ===
Paladino planned to declare a fiscal state of emergency under the New York constitution, which he would use to freeze compensation of state, municipal and school employees and cut the state budget by 10 to 20 percent. He proposed placing a minimum residency requirement of one year before anyone could claim state welfare benefits. He sought to cut the state's Medicaid budget by nearly 30%, or $20 billion ($10 billion from the state's share, the other $10 billion coming from the county and federal shares) by making significant cuts to benefits, reducing reimbursement rates, requiring identification, fingerprints, and drug testing for individuals to receive benefits. He proposed training family members to care for people who would otherwise be in long-term care. He planned to eliminate state capital gains taxes and corporate franchise taxes, at a cost of approximately $1 billion.

In the past, Paladino has called for a constitutional convention to make changes in the state constitution, which, he argued, creates a welfare state and contributes to many of the state's problems. He has proposed increasing the frequency of constitutional convention referendums, currently set for every 20 years, down to 10 years. He has also expressed distaste for public service labor unions, which he has compared to pigs, and is an outspoken critic of state laws such as the Wicks Law, which sets prevailing wage requirements, and the Taylor Law, which gives unions significant negotiating advantages in exchange for prohibiting them from striking. He promised to take a hard line in negotiations with unions, whose contracts expire in April 2011, and would have refused to grant them favorable conditions. Non-union employees would have seen immediate pay cuts of 10 percent. He supported governor David Paterson's efforts to furlough state employees. In the event of a late budget, he would have shut down most levels of government except those related to public health and safety. Paladino would have first targeted what he considered to be patronage jobs for elimination; i.e., those who, according to him, received their jobs as political favors and through family connections. Deputy commissioners would be another target for elimination. He would also have relied on the state's rank and file to target persons "incapable for whatever reason of performing their functions at a cost productive level", and hoped to eliminate 60,000 jobs from the state workforce through these reductions. He would have sought to eliminate numerous perks such as state-owned take-home vehicles. He sought to institute a merit-based pay system and end automatic raises. Paladino favored what he called "school choice", saying it would "put some competition in the marketplace" against the New York State United Teachers. Paladino also supported converting some minimum security prisons into Civilian Conservation Corps-style job camps for unemployed youth, which he dubbed the "Dignity Corps", a program he based on both the CCC and the work of a local mission in Buffalo.

=== Food trucks ===
Paladino support the elimination of food trucks in the city of Buffalo, in part because they do not have the requirement of paying property taxes as brick-and-mortar businesses must, giving the mobile vendors an advantage that Paladino believes is unfair.

=== Government reform ===
Paladino supports hard term limits of eight years on all elected officials within the state's jurisdiction, including county and local governments. He also desires to see their positions declared "part time" and as such ineligible for a state pension or lifetime medical coverage; in addition, he opposes automatic cost of living adjustment increases and seeks to force legislators to take an up or down vote on their own pay raises. He would seek a complete reorganization of the state education department and encourages dissolution of the Board of Regents, the SUNY Board of Trustees, the Lower Manhattan Development Agency, the Empire State Development Corporation, Metropolitan Transportation Authority, the Off-Track Betting Corporation, the Adirondack Park Agency, and the New York Power Authority. Similarly, the state Department of Transportation would, under Paladino's proposal, absorb the independent Thruway Authority and the Bridge and Tunnel Authorities. Paladino has proposed the use of repeatedly calling special sessions to pressure uncooperative legislators into passing his legislation, much as governor Paterson did during the 2009 New York State Senate leadership crisis and the 2010 budget negotiations. He supported moving the return to a July 1 deadline for submission of the state budget instead of April 1 so that tax revenue could be better evaluated. He also proposed supermajority approval of any tax increase. At the local government level, he would consolidate the operations of most school districts at the county level, with a single appointed superintendent, and also consolidate other local town and village operations at that level. He considered a solution for districts that span multiple counties. He did not support a reduction in operational aid for school districts and believed the budget can be balanced without reducing that aid. In response to criticisms regarding Paladino's existing leases to the state, he has stated a willingness to renegotiate the prices charged once the leases expired. He would put most of his assets in trust, turning over operations of the company to his son. (Ellicott Development Co.'s leases charged a "below average" rate, according to the state.) He was willing to support a hard property tax cap, such as the one Cuomo proposed, if it was part of a broader effort to cut spending. Some of these proposals would require amendments to the state constitution. In an open letter to Assemblywoman Janet Duprey announcing his support of challenger Karen Bisso, Paladino indicated that the "tier 6" pension reforms implemented by the Cuomo administration were wholly inadequate and "nothing more than hype".

=== Healthcare ===
Paladino opposed the Patient Protection and Affordable Care Act of 2010, and said that he believes that the long-term impact of the act would be just as memorable and possibly more deadly than the September 11 attacks.

=== LBGTQ+ rights ===
Paladino personally opposes same-sex marriage; he also states that he does not particularly care for the issue. He has spoken negatively of the concept of gay pride, particularly the sexual demonstrations at gay pride parades, which he believes are unsuitable for children. In a speech to a group of Hasidic Jews organized by Yehuda Levin on October 10, 2010, Paladino said, "I just think my children and your children would be much better off and much more successful getting married and raising a family, and I don't want them brainwashed into thinking that homosexuality is an equally valid and successful option—it isn't." He later stated that he did not agree with the statement and had not fully proofread the speech before he read it. He has said he would take a more libertarian stance on the matter in regard to state policy; he follows a "live and let live" approach to the topic of homosexuality, actively opposes discrimination against homosexuals, and encourages a statewide referendum on allowing same-sex marriage in the state, saying that he would honor the result of said referendum. If the state legislature were to pass a bill legalizing same-sex marriage or civil unions without a referendum, he would veto it. He has accused Republican lawmakers who voted in favor of the Marriage Equality Act of selling out their votes.

=== Minimum wage ===
Paladino does not object to raising the minimum wage.

=== Native American issues ===
Paladino supported proposals to enforce excise tax laws on Indian tribes such as the Seneca of the Iroquois, who are not legally required to pay state taxes on goods sold on their sovereign reservations. He suggested individuals would be punished for resistance or demonstrations. He believes the tribes are run by a cabal of "fifteen to twenty thugs" who are using their price advantage to benefit themselves and not the general populace of their reservations.

He supports the review and potential revocation of land claim settlements awarded to Iroquois tribes in court cases. He claimed that the Turning Stone Resort & Casino is operating illegally and should be shut down. Ellicott Development Co. had sold the land where the current Seneca Buffalo Creek Casino stands for between US$1,300,000 and US$3,750,000. Paladino said he received only $47,000 from the Seneca nation for the land and that the plans for the casino were far different than the ones proposed at the time of sale. They have added hotels and restaurants that Paladino opposes.

== Controversies ==
In July 2016, Paladino used Twitter to say that United States Attorney General Loretta Lynch should be lynched, then deleted his tweet. An aide said he had sent it in error. He threatened delegates to the 2016 Republican National Convention if they did not vote for Trump as pledged: "I don't trust our entire delegation (...) I'd certainly whack them if they went off the reservation."

In August 2016, Paladino falsely claimed in an interview with the New York Observer that President Barack Obama was a secret Muslim, repeating a debunked conspiracy theory. His remarks were widely condemned.

=== Praise of Adolf Hitler ===
In February 2021, he said on local radio WBEN in Buffalo, New York that "we need somebody inspirational" like Adolf Hitler, who "aroused" and "hypnotized" crowds, "screaming these epithets...that's the kind of leader we need today." On June 9, 2022, he apologized: "I understand that invoking Hitler in any context is a serious mistake and rightfully upsets people."

=== Call for executing Merrick Garland ===
Following the FBI Search of Mar-a-Lago, Paladino said on a radio show that U.S. Attorney General Merrick Garland "probably should be executed." When questioned by the show's host, Paladino said, "I'm just being facetious."

Paladino also has a habit of communicating via "open letter" which he uses to both debate and denigrate political opponents.

== Personal life ==
Paladino resides in the South Buffalo portion of the city of Buffalo and is married to Mary Catherine Hannon. The two met at the Motel DeSoto in Allegany. He later bought and demolished the building after it fell into disrepair. They had three children together: William, Danielle Jacobs, and Patrick Paladino. Patrick died March 30, 2009, from injuries received in an automobile accident. Paladino has one daughter from an extramarital affair with his former employee, Suzanne Brady. He has five grandchildren.

During his gubernatorial concession speech, Paladino addressed his late son, Patrick. The chairwoman of the campaign, Nancy Naples, told The New York Times that Paladino gained a feeling of emotional closure through his gubernatorial campaign. He had said that the campaign was something his son wanted him to do.

== See also ==
- List of richest American politicians

== Notes ==
Party political offices
Preceded by John Faso	Republican nominee for Governor of New York; 2010	Succeeded by Rob Astorino
