= Lewis G. Harriman =

American banker (1889–1973)

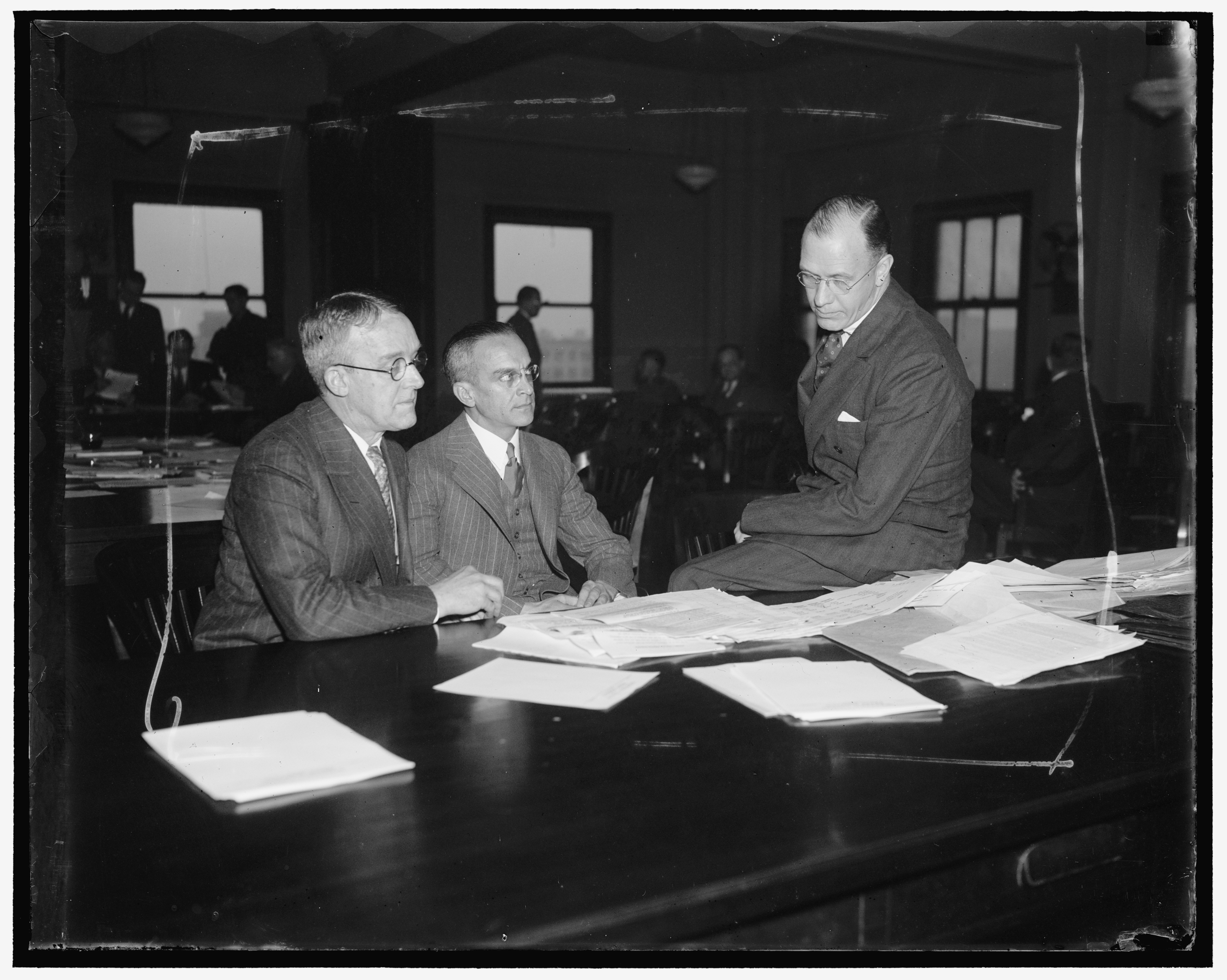
Buffalo bankers before the Securities and Exchange Commission in Washington, D.C. Left to right: Perry E. Wurst, Executive Vice-President of the Manufactures & Traders Trust Co.; Lewis G. Harriman, Pres. of the M.& T. Trust Co.; and Frank C. Trubee, Jr., President of the Manufactures and Traders Securities Corp.

Lewis Gildersleeve Harriman (March 24, 1889 – January 7, 1973) was an American banker.

== Early life ==
Harriman was born in Windsor, Connecticut on March 24, 1889. He was a son of the Rev. Frederick William Harriman (1852–1931) and Cora Elizabeth (née Jarvis) Harriman (1854–1932).

His paternal grandparents were Frederick D. Harriman and Mary (née Bostwick) Harriman. Through his great-grandmother, Sophia (née Hilton) Harriman, he was a descendant of Moral Hilton, who fought in the Revolutionary War as a Sergeant under Capt. Benjamin Lemont.

He graduated from Trinity College in Hartford with a B.S. degree in 1909 and an M.S. degree in 1917.

== Career ==
From 1909 to 1911, he worked for the Creosoting Company in Louisville. From 1912 to 1915, he was an electrical engineer with the American Real Estate Company in New York City after which he worked for Coggeshell & Hicks, and Merrill. He became assistant trust officer and investment trust officer Guaranty Trust Company in New York City, until 1919 when he joined the Fidelity Trust Company of Buffalo, New York as vice president. In 1924, he became president and the following year, Fidelity Trust merged with the Manufacturers and Traders Trust Company to create a $100 million company that was headed by the 36-year-old Harriman. Harriman and a group of investors including A. H. Schoellkopf, from the founding family of the Niagara Mohawk power company, and James V. Forrestal, who would become the first U.S. Secretary of Defense, owned enough shares to control both Fidelity and M&T. In 1961, Delmer F. Hubbell Jr. succeeded Harriman as President of M&T Discount Corporation, its principal dealer in bankers' acceptances in New York City. Harriman then became chairman of the board. He served as president of the parent company, M&T Bank, from 1925 to 1954, after which he became chairman of the board. In 1964, Charles W. Millard succeeded Harriman as chairman of M&T and became honorary chairman.

In 1929, he was elected a director of the American Founders' Corporation to succeed George Rea. In 1943, he was elected to the board of Delaware, Lackawanna and Western Railroad Company. In 1945, he was elected to the board of the Sterling Engine Company. In 1951, he was appointed a director of the Federal Reserve Bank of New York Buffalo Branch succeeding George G. Kleindinst of the Liberty Bank of Buffalo.

== Personal life ==
On June 24, 1915, Harriman was married to Grace Bastine. Before their divorce in 1939, they were the parents of five children: Lewis Gildersleeve Harriman Jr, Wiliam Bradford Harriman, John Howland Harriman (1920–2012), Thomas Harriman, and Elizabeth Harriman (b. 1923), who married Charles Palmer Bean, son of Barton A. Bean Jr., in 1947.

After his divorce, he married Louise Ely (1899–1975) on October 11, 1939. He adopted Louise’s daughters, Joan (1928) and Ann (1930), but was actually Ann’s paternal father.

Harriman died in Miami-Dade County, Florida on January 7, 1973. After a service at Trinity Episcopal Church, he was buried at Forest Lawn Cemetery, Buffalo.
