= Ellicott Development Co. =

Ellicott Development Company
- Founded: 1973
- Founder: Carl Paladino
- Headquarters: Buffalo, New York, United States
- Area served: Western New York, Central New York and Pennsylvania
- Key people: Carl Paladino, Chairman; William Paladino, CEO; Joseph Hannon, President
- Services: Real Estate Development
- Website: www.ellicottdevelopment.com

Ellicott Development Co. is an American property management, leasing and development real estate firm based in Buffalo, New York and led by CEO William Paladino. The company's asset base includes residential, commercial, hotels, parking garages, and convenience stores. Ellicott Development Co.’s services include legal, administrative, financial, management, accounting, development, site selection, site assemblage, architectural design and drafting services, construction, leasing, maintenance, janitorial and security services.

== History ==
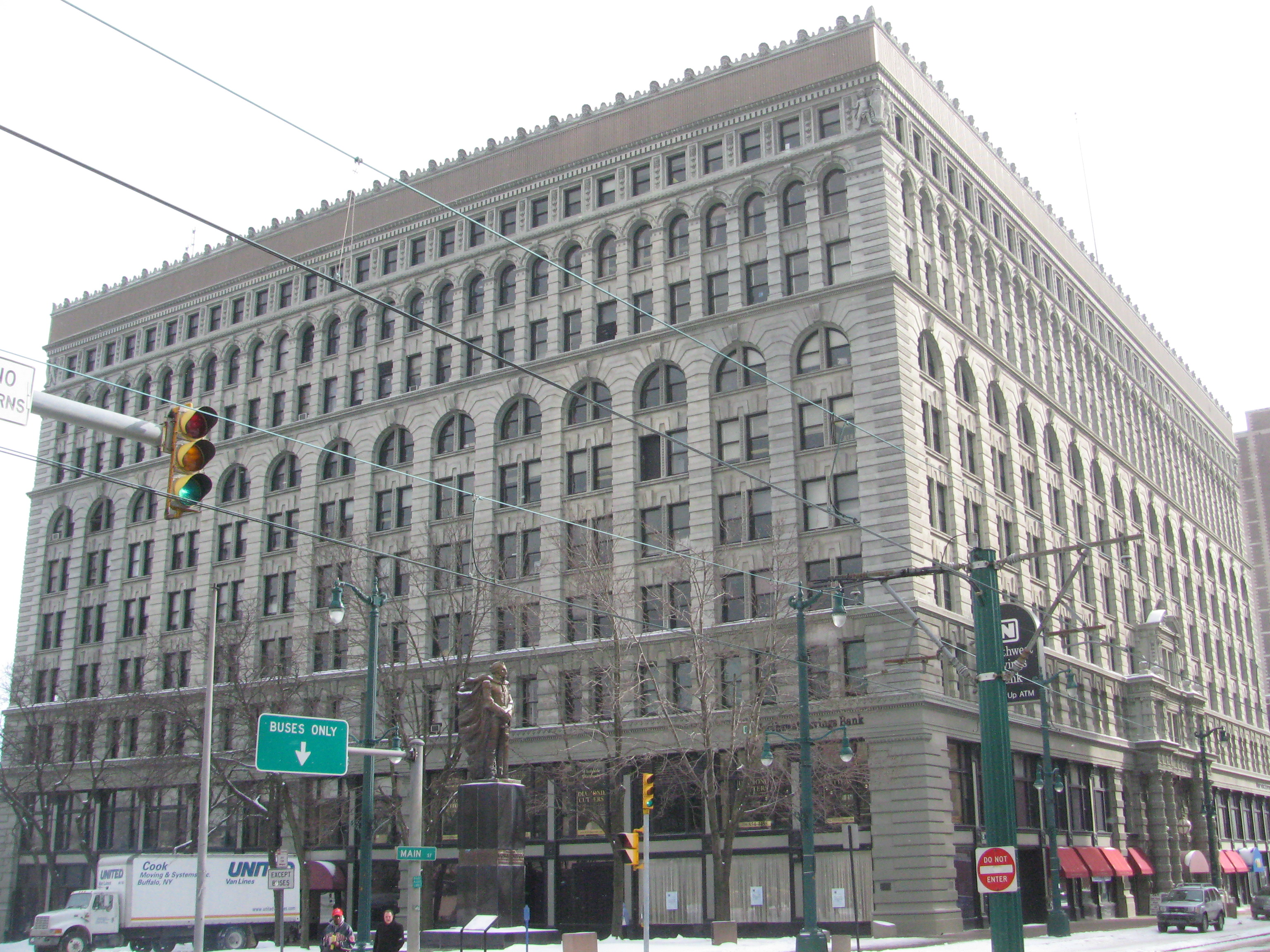
Ellicott Square Building in Buffalo, New York

Ellicott Development Co. was founded by lawyer and real estate developer Carl Paladino in 1973. The company is named after the Ellicott Square Building, Paladino's first and largest real estate acquisition to date. The Ellicott Square Building was named after Joseph Ellicott, the planner and surveyor who laid out the then-village of Buffalo.

The company buys properties, builds stores, and leases them to national retail outlets and government agencies. The company has operations in Western New York, Central New York and portions of Pennsylvania. Ellicott Development Co. describes itself as "a multi-faceted, fully integrated Property Management, Leasing and Development Firm with the "In-House" capacity to provide legal, administrative, financial, management, accounting, development, site selection, site assemblage, architectural design and drafting services, construction, leasing, maintenance, janitorial and security services."

Ellicott Development Co. has properties throughout the Buffalo/Niagara region, Upstate New York and into Western Pennsylvania. In 2010, the company managed more than 5,000,000 square feet (460,000 m^{2}) of office, retail, hotel and residential space. In downtown Buffalo, the company manages over 1,500,000 square feet (140,000 m^{2}) of office space (making Ellicott the largest private landlord in downtown Buffalo), over 1,000,000 square feet (93,000 m^{2}) of retail space throughout New York and Western Pennsylvania, eight major hotels in the Western New York, as well as more than 550,000 square feet (51,000 m^{2}) of residential apartments, condominiums and townhomes in the Buffalo/Niagara region.

As of 2010, the Company had built 160 drugstores for Rite Aid, eventually becoming the Rite Aid's preferred developer across Upstate New York and western Pennsylvania, 80 of which Ellicott still owned.

== Properties ==
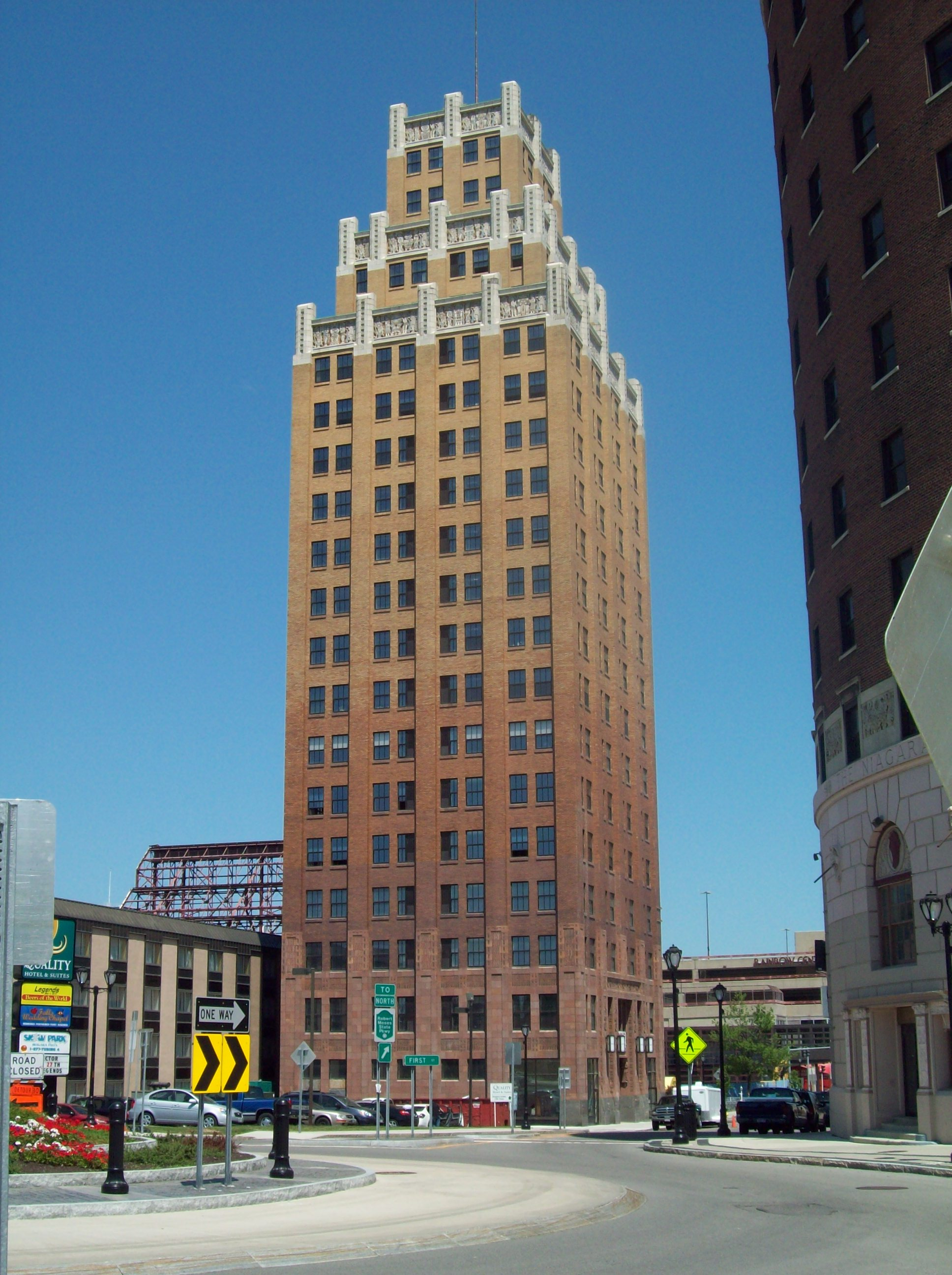
United Office Building in Niagara Falls, New York

Ellicott Development Co. has owned and/or developed many historically significant properties. Examples include:

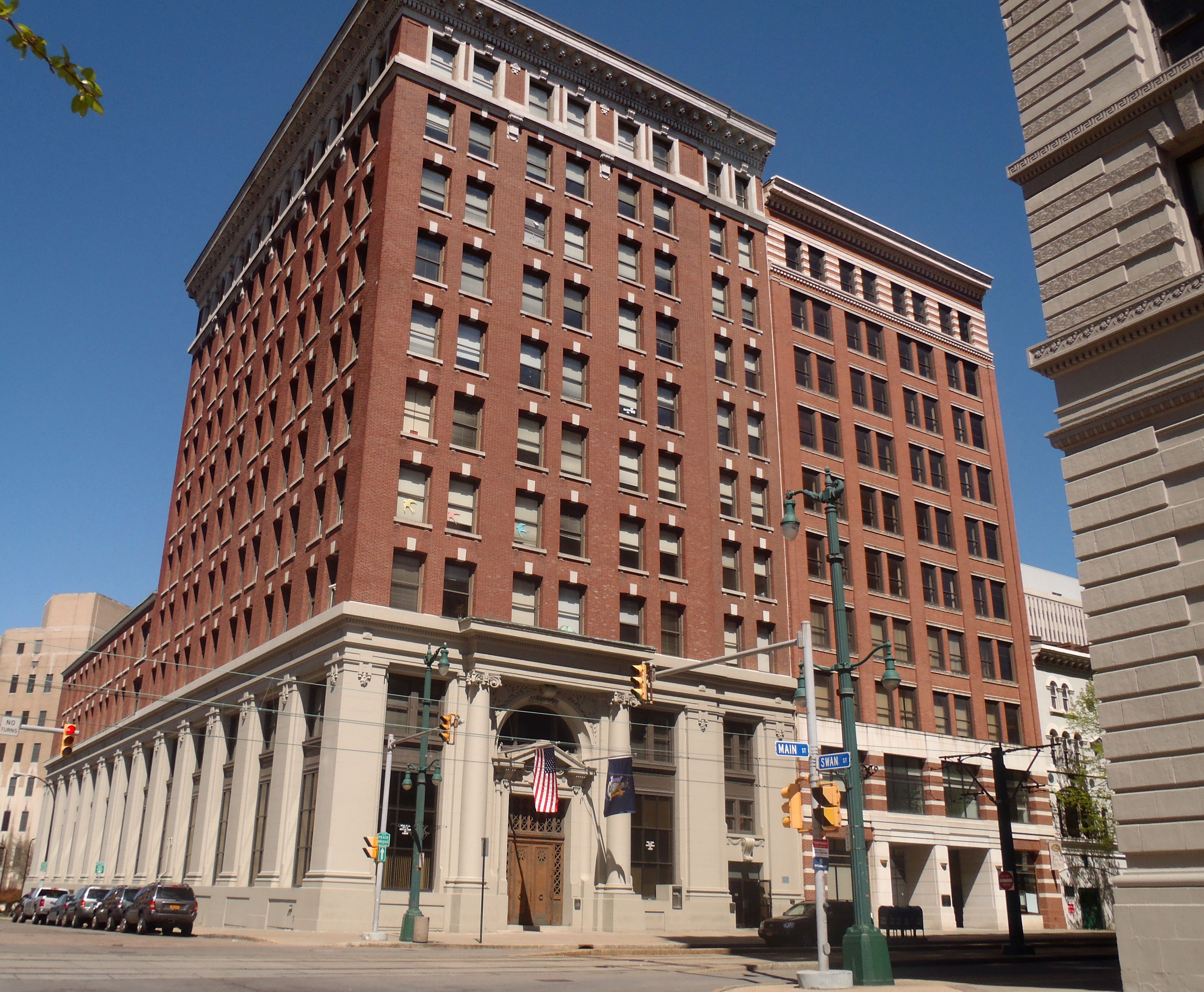
Swan Tower in Buffalo, New York

- 14 North Street, 14 North St., Buffalo – built in 1899 and previously the First Baptist Church.
- Berkeley Apartments also known as the Graystone Hotel, 24 Johnson Park, Buffalo – built in 1894 by architect Carlton T. Strong and engineer Ernest L. Ransome for the Pan-American Exposition.
- Ellicott Square Building, 283 Main St., Buffalo – built in 1896 and designed by Charles Atwood of D. H. Burnham & Company.
- Fairmont Creamery Building, 199 Scott St., Buffalo – built in 1920 for the Fairmont Creamery as a cold storage facility.
- Fidelity Trust Building also known as the Swan Tower, 284 Main Street in Buffalo – built in 1909 and designed by E. B. Green of Green & Wicks
- United Office Building also known as the Giacomo, 220 Rainbow Blvd., Niagara Falls – built in 1929 and designed by the Esenwein & Johnson.
- Mickey Rats, a landmark bar and grill on the Lake Erie shoreline in Evans, New York.

== Projects in development ==
- 11 Chicago Street, Buffalo – a former Brownfield site; there are tentative plans for a 100,000 square feet (9,300 m^{2}) office building
- 905 Elmwood Avenue, Buffalo – L-shaped building, designed by Kideney Architects and anchored by a 5,000 square feet (460 m^{2}) restaurant, as well as 21 apartments with additional street-level retail (approximately $10 million)
- 201 Ganson Street, Buffalo – a 54,000 square feet (5,000 m^{2}) structure on a 13-acre property near Buffalo RiverWorks that has over a quarter mile of Buffalo River frontage. It will purportedly be used for commercial and industrial use.
- 310 Niagara Street, Niagara Falls – now used as the offices of The Niagara Gazette. The Niagara Gazette will be moving into space owned by Ellicott at 473 Third St., Niagara Falls. Plans for renovation are unknown at the current time.
- 399 Ohio Street, Buffalo – 5-story mixed-use development with 30 apartments on the upper three floors, with commercial space and ground-level restaurant (approximately $6 million). The site faces the Buffalo River and is across from Father Conway Park in the Old First Ward.
- Waterfront Village, Buffalo – nine townhouses on Ojibawa Circle adjacent to the existing Ellicott Development, Pasquale Towers (approximately $4.5 million)
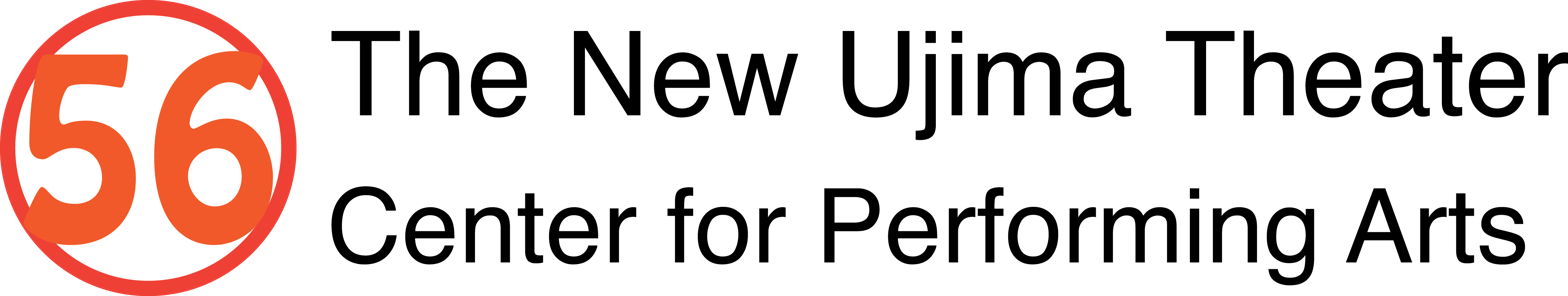
  New Ujima Theatre Logo
- 722 West Delavan formerly Frederick Law Olmsted School - School 56, Buffalo – a 76,000 square feet (7,100 m^{2}) four-story building on Elmwood and West Delevan that will be converted to a mixed-use project with 33 apartments, approved on 28 July 2015 by the Buffalo Planning Board. Due to public outcry regarding Carl Paladino's racist remarks about three local officials and resulting denial by the IDA of tax breaks to the developer, he has decided to convert 722 West Delavan- the old P.S. 56- into a theater and performing arts center. The Ujima Theatre Co. will occupy the space; it plans to produce works that are rooted in traditional African-American theater.
- 207 West Huron, Buffalo – renovation of a 26,000 square feet (2,400 m^{2}) a lower West Side building, constructed in 1955
- 960 Busti Avenue, Buffalo – a 56,000 square feet (5,200 m^{2}) warehouse on the West Side built in 1930, north of the Peace Bridge that overlooks the Niagara River; it will be converted into a mixed-use project with 18-20 apartments (approximately $7–10 million)

== See also ==
- Carl Paladino
- Buffalo, New York
- National Register of Historic Places listings in Buffalo, New York
