= WPC =

WPC may refer to:

== Events ==
- Microsoft Worldwide Partner Conference, an annual conference held by the Microsoft Corporation
- World Puzzle Championship, an annual international puzzle competition
- World Policy Conference, an annual conference on global governance

== Governmental organizations ==
- Weather Prediction Center, part of the U.S. National Weather Service
- Western Power Corporation, owned by the Government of Western Australia, the major electricity supplier from 1995 through 2006
- Wireless Planning & Coordination Wing, an Indian government branch

== Other organizations ==
- War Pensions Committee, a body of people established to support veterans in the UK
- West Penn Conference, intercollegiate athletic conference that operated from 1958 to 1969 in Western Pennsylvania
- Westminster Presbyterian Church (disambiguation)
- Western Pennsylvania Conservancy, a charity based in Pittsburgh, Pennsylvania, United States
- Wildlife Preservation Canada, a wildlife conservation organization
- Wireless Power & Communication, a privately held company based in Norway
- Wireless Power Consortium, the business alliance that developed the Qi inductive power standard
- Women's Political Council, an Alabama-based organization that was part of the Civil Rights Movement
- Women's Press Collective, an all-woman publisher between 1969 and 1978 founded by Judy Grahn
- Workingmen's Party of California, an American labor organization
- World Parkinson Congress, a support organization people with Parkinson's Disease
- World Peace Council, an anti-war organization based in Athens, Greece
- World Plumbing Council, an international organization concerned with plumbing standards
- World Policy Council, a think tank based in Washington, D.C., United States
- World Powerlifting Congress, an international sports federation
- World Press Cartoon, a cartoonist organization

== Other uses ==
- Whey concentrate, or whey protein concentrate
- Williams Pinball Controller, a set of circuit boards used in pinball machines throughout the 1990s
- Woman police constable, a former rank in the British police and other commonwealth countries, see History of the Metropolitan Police Service
- Wood-plastic composite, composite materials made of wood fiber and thermoplastics
- WPC 56, a British television drama series
- A code given to numerous United States Coast Guard cutters
- Wonderful Pretty Cure!, the twenty-first installment of the Pretty Cure franchise, released in 2024
- William Patrick Corgan Jr., an American musician and songwriter
- William Prideaux Courtney, biographer who contributed to the Dictionary of National Biography as "W. P. C."
- Wireless-powered communication

== See also ==
- WPCS (disambiguation)
