= Clement House (Buffalo, New York) =

Mansion in Buffalo, New York, U.S.

- The Clement House
- U.S. National Historic Landmark District – Contributing property
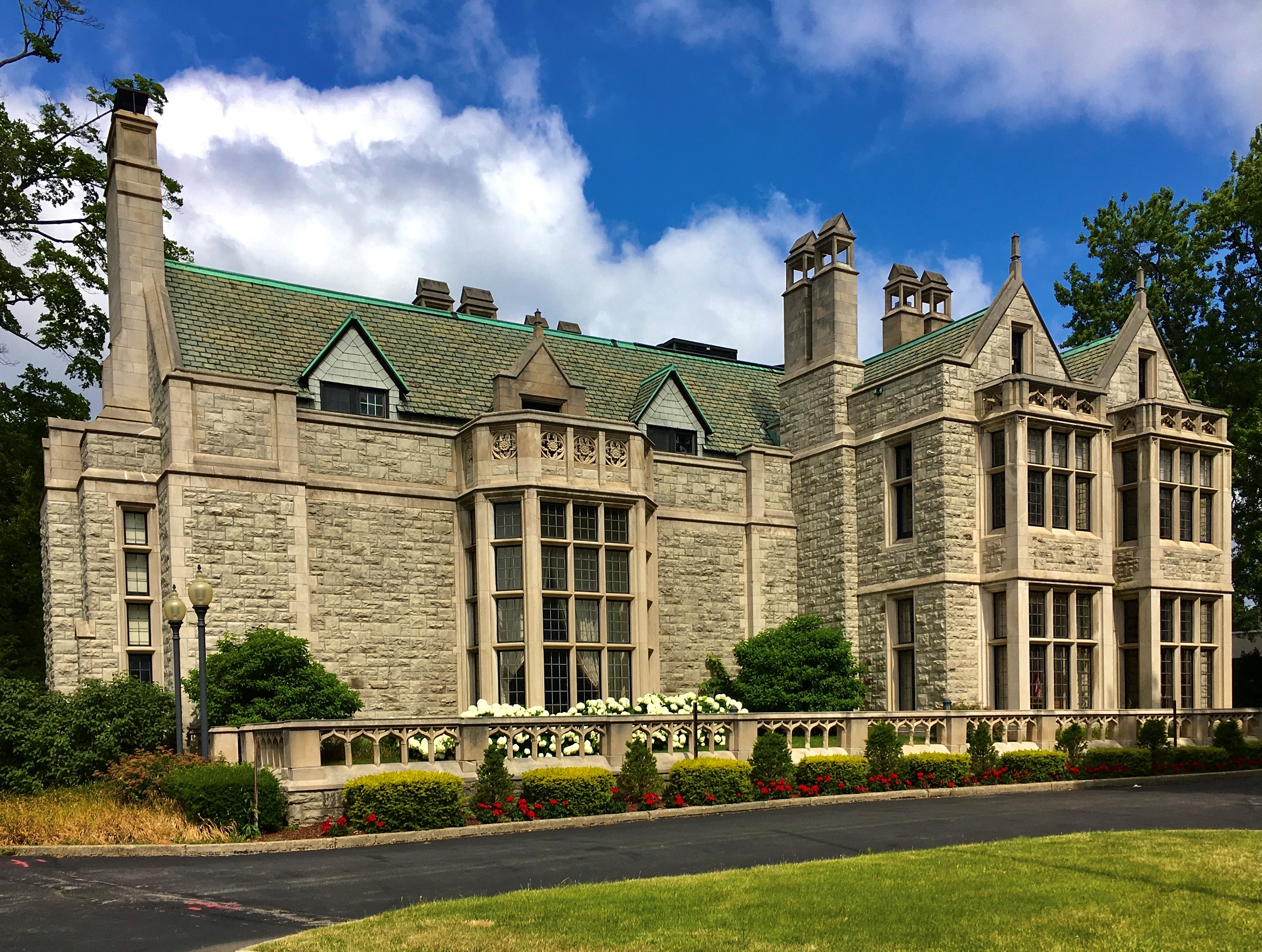
- The Clement House, July 2017

- Location within New York Location within the United States
- Interactive map showing the location of Clement House
- Location: 786 Delaware Avenue, Buffalo, NY
- Coordinates: 42°54′21″N 78°52′22″W
- Built: 1913
- Architect: Edward Brodhead Green of Green & Wicks
- Architectural style: Tudor/Gothic Revival
- Part of: Delaware Avenue Historic District (ID74001232)

The Clement House, also known as the Red Cross Building, is a 17,000 square feet (1,600 m^{2}) mansion in Buffalo, New York, that was built in 1913. The house was designed by the architect Edward Brodhead Green of Green & Wicks for Stephen Merrell Clement, the president of Marine National Bank, and his wife Carolyn. The building is a contributing property to the Delaware Avenue Historic District designated in 1974.

== History ==
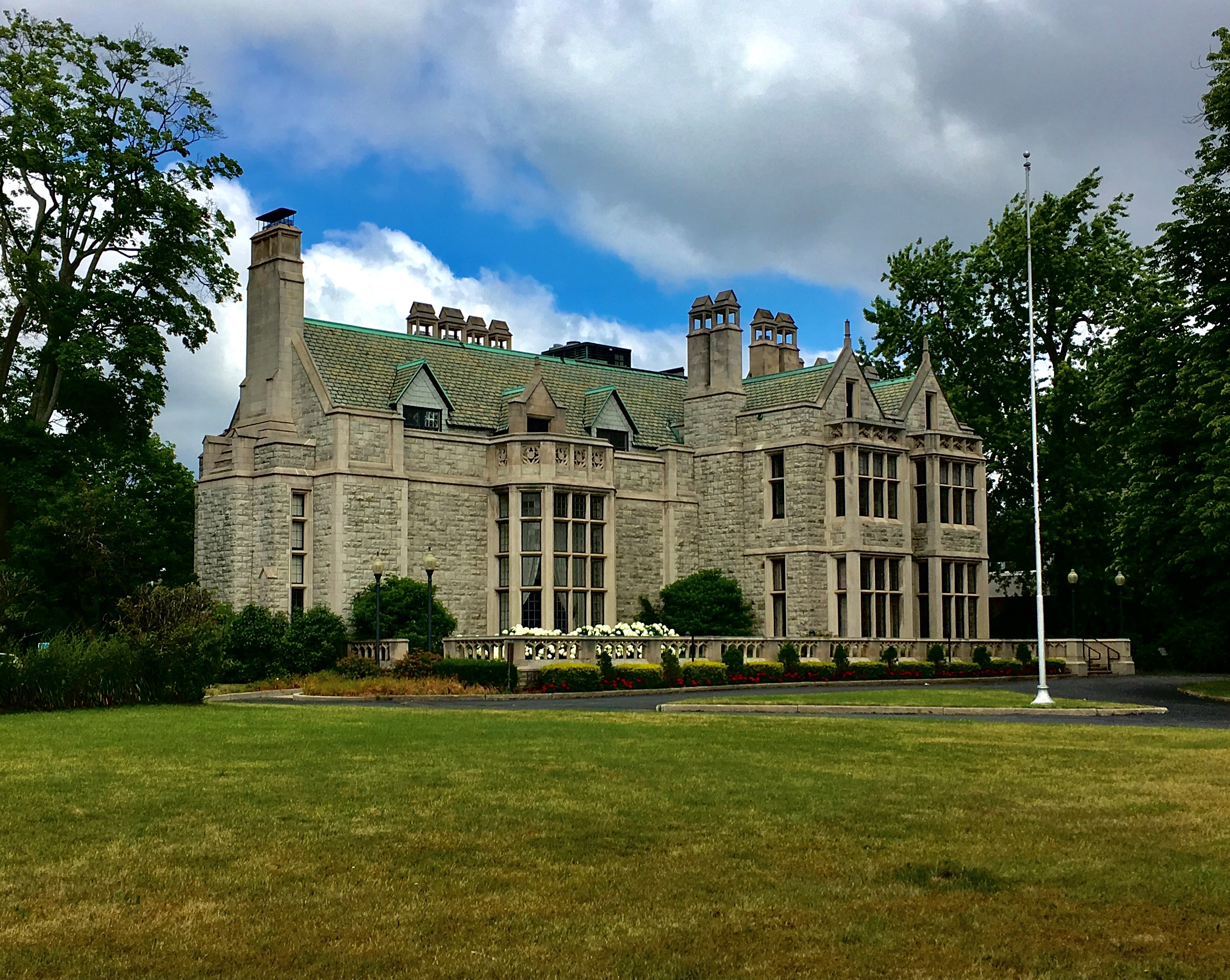
The Clement House, July 2017

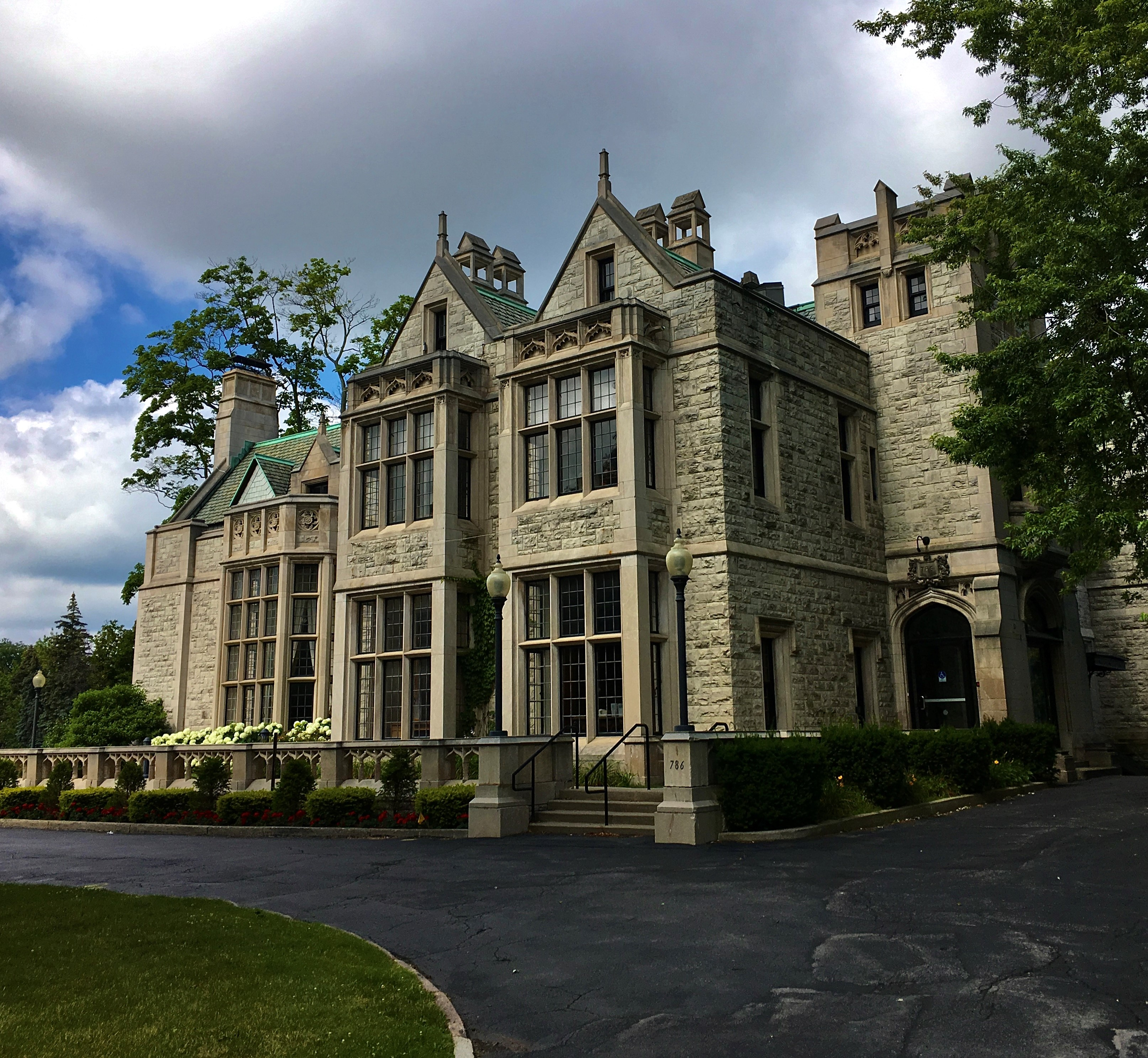
The Clement House, July 2017

In 1908, Augustus Franklin Tripp died and his daughter, Carolyn Jewett (nee Tripp) Clement, inherited the Tripp residence at 786 Delaware which had been built by Erastus S. Prosser around 1855 and purchased by Tripp in 1881. She and her husband, the banker and industrialist Stephen Merrell Clement, (Note: The youngest of the Clement's six children was Stuart Holmes Clement (1895–1974), who in 1911 married Margaret Livingston Bush (1899–1993), the daughter of industrialist Samuel Prescott Bush, sister of U.S. Senator Prescott Sheldon Bush, aunt of President George H. W. Bush and great-aunt of President George W. Bush.) tore down the Tripp residence in 1911 and commissioned Stephen's friend, Edward Brodhead Green to build them a palatial new residence. The fireplace in the drawing room of the Tripp residence was removed and installed in the master bedroom of the new house. Before that, the Clements were living at the home of Stephen's later father at 737 Delaware Avenue. Stephen died in Atlantic City, New Jersey, on 26 March 1913 before the house was completed later in 1913 at a cost $300,000 to erect.

Their home had 20 rooms, including a music room, a library, a reception room and a wardrobe room. The family bedrooms were on the second floor and the third floor was the servants' quarters. The entire left side of the house was the Clement's 1,040 square feet (97 m^{2}) music room which had two Steinway grand pianos, a harp and a pipe organ. The pipe organ was built by the Austin Organ Co. of Hartford, CT. as their Opus 349 in 1913 (Austin opus list).

In 1919, the neighboring residence at 776 Delaware Avenue, a Richardsonian Romanesque mansion known as the Gratwick House, was torn down. Carolyn's father had originally sold a portion of his property to William H. Gratwick who had Henry Hobson Richardson design the house in 1886 as his last commission. The home was constructed in 1888 and completed by Shepley, Rutan and Coolidge, the firm that continued Richardson's practice.

=== American Red Cross ===
In June 1941, Carolyn donated the house to the Western New York Chapter of the American Red Cross. The residence underwent major restoration in 1999. In 2017, The Buffalo Philharmonic Orchestra and the Red Cross announced that a local developer and philanthropist, John Yurtchuk (co-owner of Calspan), would purchase the property and donate the campus centerpiece, the Clement Residence, to the Buffalo Philharmonic as a gift. After the sale, the residence would house the administrative staff of both the Red Cross and orchestra "with the Red Cross occupying a portion of the first floor and the entire third floor while the BPO staff will occupy the second floor. The foyer and conference rooms on the main floor will be shared by the two organizations".

In 1979, an office building and an adjoining structure connected by an atrium were built on the back portion of the 4 acres (1.6 ha) plot near the carriage house and another parking lot. In 2018, BestSelf Behavioral Health, a non-profit agency, paid $3.15 million to buy the 53,500 square feet (4,970 m^{2}) complex on 2.85 acres (1.15 ha) behind the Clement Mansion.

== See also ==
- Delaware Avenue Historic District (Buffalo, New York)
- Architecture of Buffalo, New York
- Gothic Revival architecture in New York
