= Williams-Pratt House =

The Williams-Pratt House
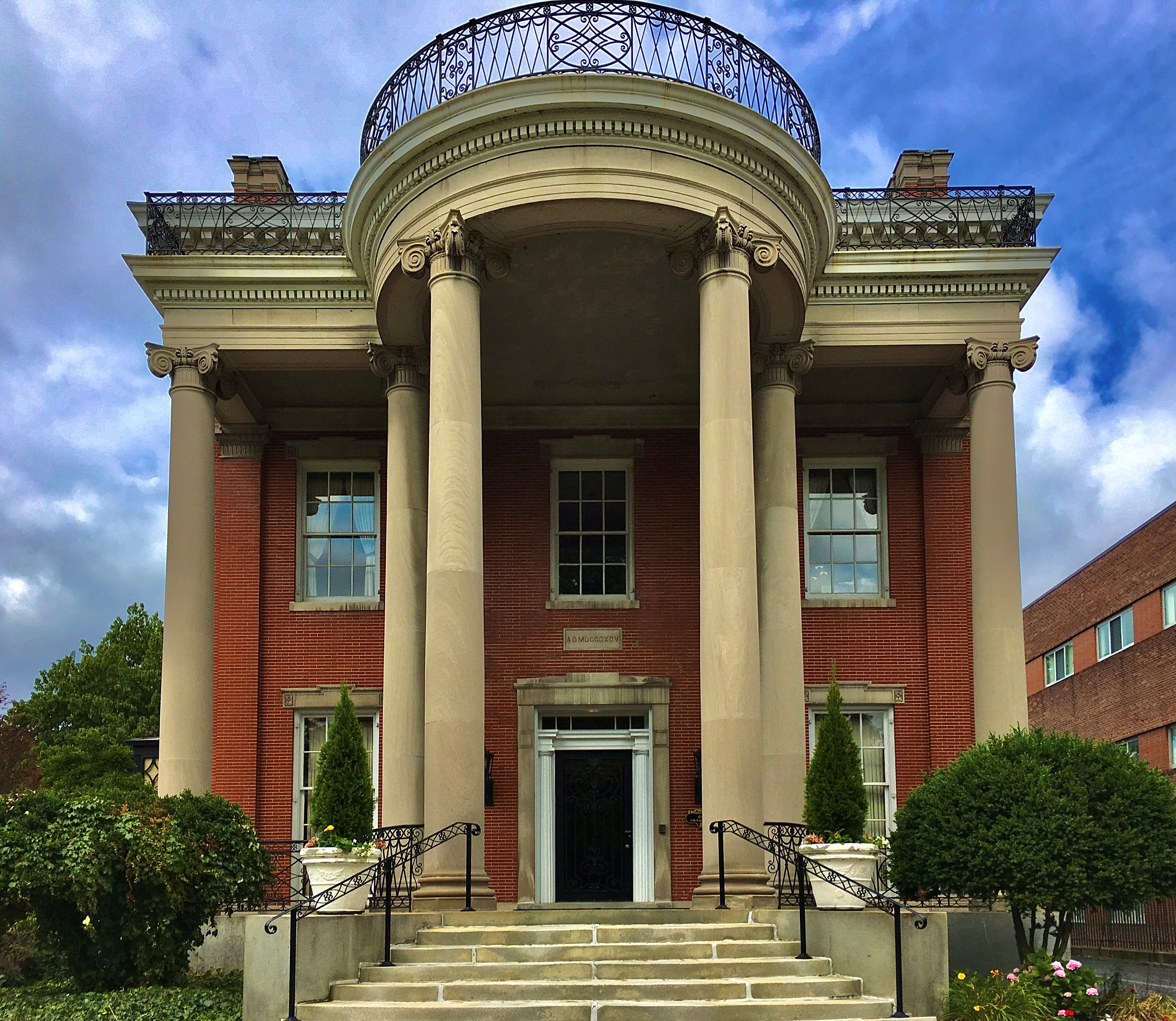
- The Williams-Pratt House, July 2017
- Interactive map of the The Williams-Pratt House area

General information
- Architectural style: Georgian Revival
- Location: 690 Delaware Avenue, Buffalo, NY
- Coordinates: 42°54′11″N 78°52′24″W
- Construction started: 1895
- Completed: 1896
- Owner: LiRo Group

Technical details
- Floor area: 11,040 sq. ft.

Design and construction
- Architect: Stanford White of McKim, Mead and White

The Williams-Pratt House, is a roughly 11,040 sq. ft. mansion located in Buffalo, New York, which was built between 1896 and 1899. The house was designed by architect Stanford White of the New York firm of McKim, Mead & White for Charles Howard Williams and his wife Emma. The building is a contributing property to the Delaware Avenue Historic District designated in 1974.

== History ==
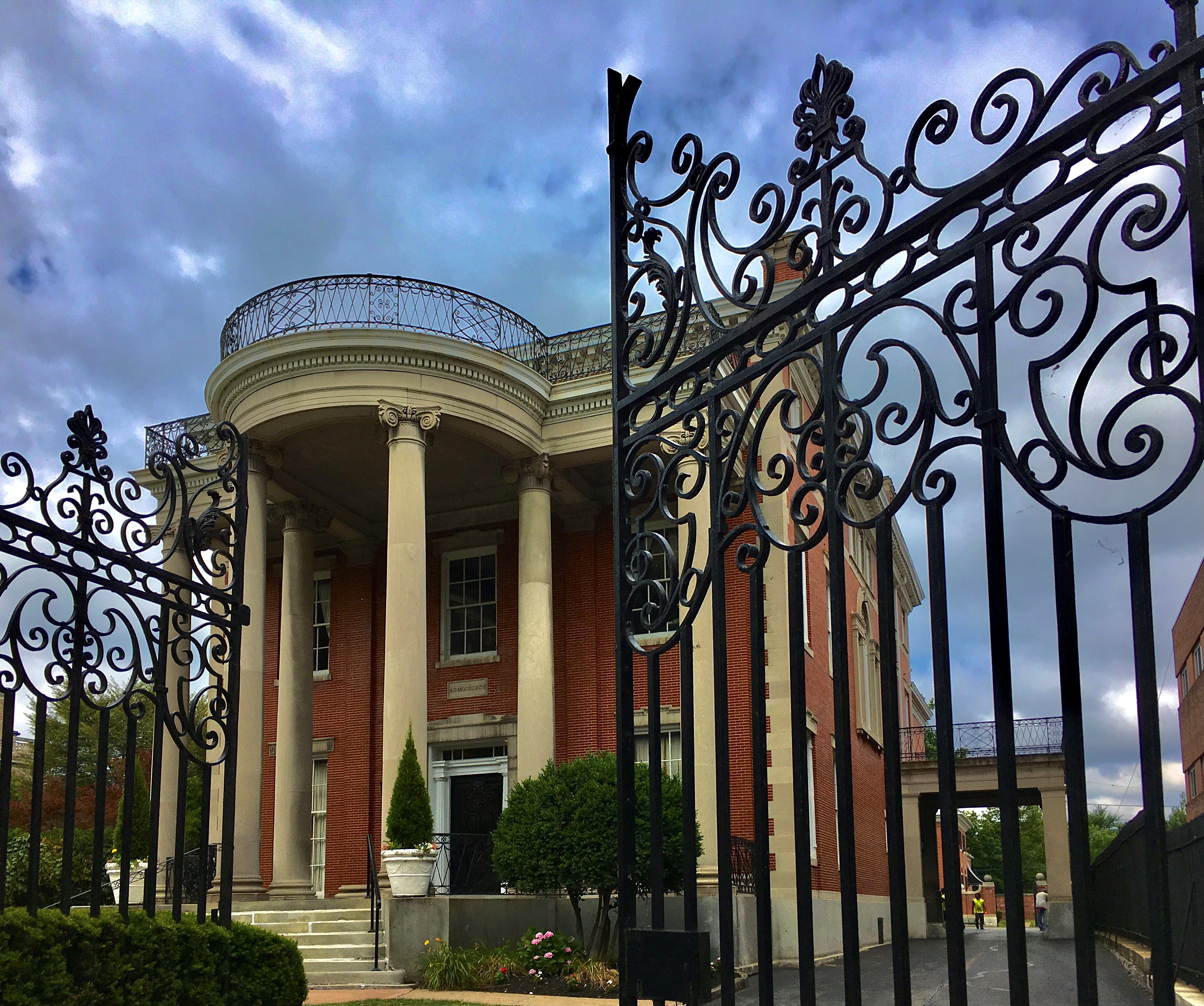
The Williams-Pratt House seen through the front gate, July 2017

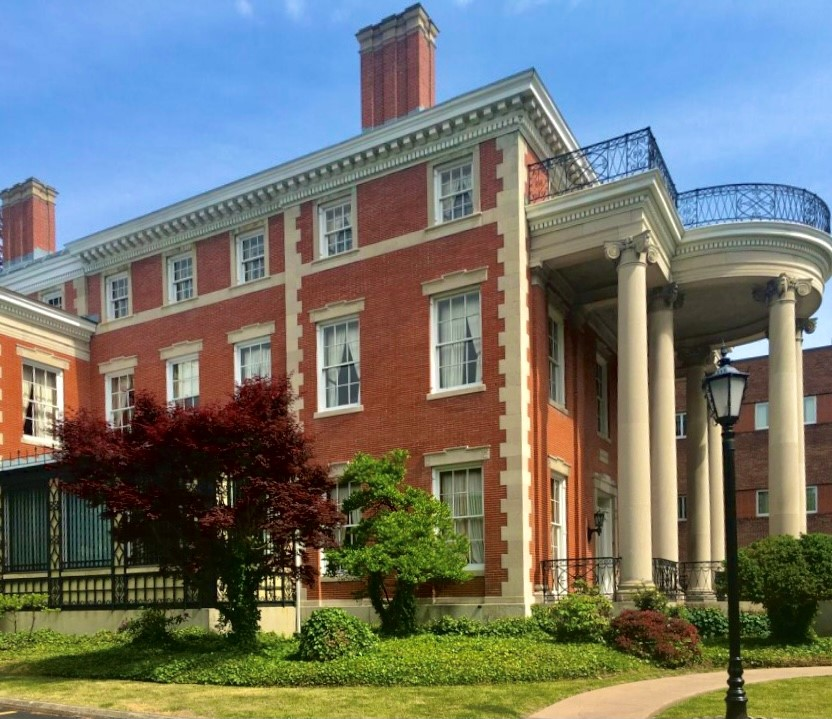
The Williams-Pratt House, July 2017

In 1895, Charles Howard Williams and his wife, the former Emma Alice Jewett, engaged Stanford White of McKim, Mead & White to design them a residence at 690 Delaware on an adjoining lot to his brother William at 672 Delaware Avenue. Williams, the eldest son of Gibson T. Williams, (Note: Charles Howard Williams' father, Gibson T. Williams, was said to be one of the two wealthiest men in Buffalo, second only to Elbridge G. Spaulding who was known as the "Father of the Greenback." After the elder Williams' death in 1891, the brothers inherited in equal shares the bulk of their father's real estate holdings. The two brothers owned the largest tannery in the United States in Salamanca but sold it to focus on their individual estates and banking interests.) was on the board of directors of several banks, including the Bank of Buffalo and the Bank of Niagara in Niagara Falls, and owned extensive real estate holdings in the area, largely "along the east side of Main Street, between Eagle and Tupper streets".

Edward York, later of York and Sawyer, assisted White on the project. The main house was 11,040-square-feet and had a 6,242-square-foot carriage house was built for $66,700. The front portico, featuring iron railings made by August Feine & Sons, is supported by six Ionic columns. The property is surrounded by a fence and gates were made locally in Buffalo by John H. Williams Iron Works. The north side of the house prominently features a porte-cochère.

According to the 1974 nomination of the Delaware Avenue Historic District to the National Register of Historic Places: "The red brick #690 is also three stories but appears smaller than its neighbor to the south. It has a hipped roof and a two-story front porch with Ionic columns. On the interior, a sculptured fireplace, a carved staircase, tiled walls, and gold leaf wall decorations remain as well as many of the origin brass and crystal wall fittings."

In January 1900, a fire broke out at the home. It started in the south wing of the house at Williams' sleeping room, consumed the heavy woodwork that was on all sides of the bedroom, and spread to the adjourning rooms. His bedroom was gutted and the closest bedroom and bathroom were considerably damaged for a total damage of $6,000 to $7,000.

=== Pratt family ===
After the death of Charles and Emma Williams in 1909, their only child Jeannie Jewett (née Williams) Pratt inherited the home, which she moved into with her husband Frederick Lorenz Pratt (the eldest son of banker and industrialist Pascal Paoli Pratt and brother of Katharine Pratt Horton). The Pratts had married in the reception room of the house three years earlier in 1906. During their ownership of the house, the Pratt's entertained lavishly, including an "Oriental Ball" in 1926 when the mansion was transformed:

"One of the most brilliant balls given in recent years and by far the outstanding social event of this winter was the Oriental costume ball which Mrs. Frederick Pratt, one of society's prominent matrons, gave at her home in Delaware avenue last evening. The house was beautifully adorned with Oriental hangings and ornaments. The portico across the front of the house had been enclosed to allow more room for the dancing couples and was transformed into an Egyptian setting while one of the spacious living rooms Was arranged as a smoking room in East Indian fashion, the whole effect being one of splendid color."

Frederick Pratt died in 1922. Jeannie, who lost much of her fortune during the Great Depression, died in August 1949.

=== Civic ownership ===
In 1938, the City of Buffalo took over the house for back taxes. The building stood vacant for three years until 1940 when the Common Council voted to dedicate the mansion to the veterans of the Grand Army of the Republic (who served in the American Civil War) and the Spanish–American War for use as a meeting place and storage for records. The veterans moved in on April 15, 1941, and called the property the GAR Memorial Hall.

In 1955, two separate real estate companies tried to purchase to buy the property from the Common Council with the hope of tearing down the structure and replacing it with a modern office building. The sale was vigorously opposed by veteran groups and the Common Council rejected the offers and allowed the veterans to continue occupying the building.

=== Recent owners ===
In 1978, Buffalo businessman Paul Snyder bought the 30-room house from the city to house his Snyder corporation, the Niagara Trading Corp. In 2000, Snyder listed the property for sale at $895,000. It was eventually bought by the LiRo Group, a national construction and engineering firm, who acquired the property for use as its headquarters.

== See also ==
- Delaware Avenue Historic District (Buffalo, New York)
- Architecture of Buffalo, New York
