= Stephen Merrell Clement =

American banker, businessman and industrialist

- Born: November 3, 1859; Fredonia, New York, U.S.
- Died: March 26, 1913 (aged 53); Atlantic City, New Jersey, U.S.
- Resting place: Forest Lawn Cemetery, Buffalo
- Education: Yale University
- Spouse: Carolyn Jewett Tripp (m. 1884)
- Children: 6
- Parent(s): Stephen Mallory Clement; Sarah Elizabeth Leonard

Stephen Merrell Clement or S. M. Clement, Jr. (November 4, 1859 – March 26, 1913) was an American banker, businessman and industrialist in Buffalo, New York.

== Early life ==
Clement was born on November 4, 1859, in Fredonia, New York, to Stephen Mallory Clement (1825–1892) Sarah Elizabeth Leonard (1824–1891). His brother was Henry Clay Clement. His father founded the Fredonia Bank in 1855 and was president of the bank until 1869 when he moved the family to Buffalo to become Cashier of The Marine Bank.

He was a descendant of Col. Giles Jackson of Berkshire County and Capt. Caleb B. Merrell, of Herkimer Co., who both fought in the American Revolutionary War.

Clement attended the State Normal School and then Yale University, where he was a member of Scroll & Key and where he graduated from in 1882. Following his graduation from Yale, he traveled around Europe with friends visiting Persia.

== Career ==
In 1883, he returned to Buffalo and within two years, was made Cashier at The Marine Bank. By 1895, three years after the death of his father, he became president of the Bank. He spearheaded the construction of the Bank's headquarters, the Marine Trust Building, designed by his friend, Edward Brodhead Green (1855–1950), a prominent Buffalo architect. In 1902, he oversaw the merger of The Buffalo Commercial Bank, which had capital of $250,000, and the Marine National Bank, which had capital of $200,000 and surplus $1,000,000.

After a heart attack slowed him down in 1911, he decided to divest his 30% share of to Marine Bank, selling in 1913 shortly before his death, to Seymour H. Knox I, a founder of the F. W. Woolworth Company.

He was an organizer of the Buffalo Clearing House and served as chairman from 1892 until 1912. He was also an organizer of the Power City Bank, in Niagara Falls that assisted in financing Hydroelectric power at Niagara Falls. He served as president of the Merchant's National Bank of Dunkirk, was a director of the Ontario Power Company, the Niagara, Lockport & Ontario Transmission Company, the International Railway Company, and the Buffalo Abstract & Title Company. He also served as president of the Buffalo & Susquehanna Steamship Company and was vice-president of the Rogers-Brown Iron Company alongside Edmund B. Hayes.

=== Residence ===
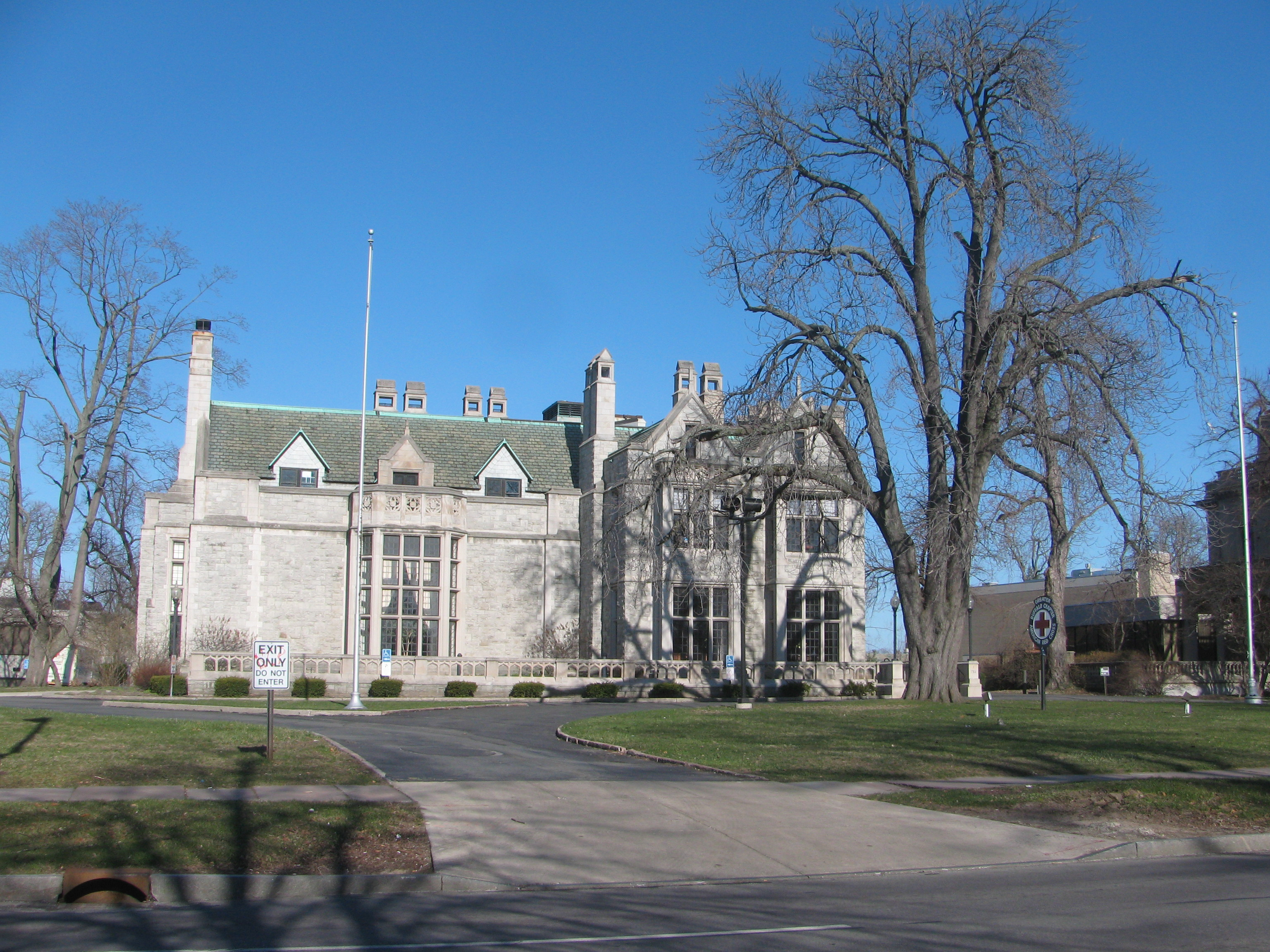
Clement Mansion, 786 Delaware Avenue, Buffalo, New York

In 1892, after his father died, his family moved into his father's former home at 737 Delaware Avenue. When his father-in-law died in 1908, they inherited his house at 786 Delaware, which they torn down in 1911. On that site, they again commissioned his friend, E.B. Green, to build him a palatial home at 786 Delaware Avenue, which was completed in 1913. The house, which cost $300,000 to erect, was donated by his widow to the American Red Cross in June 1941. In 2017, The Buffalo Philharmonic Orchestra and the American Red Cross, Western New York Chapter, announced that local developer and philanthropist John Yurtchuk would purchase the property at 786 Delaware Avenue and would donate the campus centerpiece, the Clement Residence, to the BPO as a gift to the orchestra's Crescendo Campaign. It now houses both the Red Cross and BPO administrative staffs. This gesture ranks among the biggest and most creative donations in the history of the BPO.

In the 1890s, they bought property in East Aurora, then considered the countryside just outside of Buffalo. There they built a summer house and dairy farm, known as "Elmhurst" and later, "The Homestead."

== Personal life ==
On March 27, 1884, he married Carolyn Jewett Tripp (1861–1943), the daughter of Augustus Franklin Tripp (1822–1908) and Mary Mehitable Steele (1826–1866). Together, they had six children, four boys and two girls:

- Norman Parsons Clement (1885–1951), who married Margaret Hale, daughter of William S. Hale, in 1908.
- Edith Cochran Clement (1886–1891), who died young.
- Stephen Merrell "Merrell" Clement, Jr. (1887–1943), who married Jean Derrick.
- Harold Tripp Clement (1890–1971), who married Constance Allen (1892–1971)
- Marion Clement (1892–1918), who married Alexander C. Tener.
- Stuart Holmes Clement (1895–1974), who married Margaret Livingston Bush (1899–1993), the daughter of Samuel Prescott Bush and sister of Prescott Sheldon Bush (1895–1972), in 1911. She was the aunt of President of the United States George H. W. Bush.

Clement was a member of the Buffalo Club, the Buffalo Country Club, the University Club of Buffalo and the University Club of New York City. He joined the Sons of the American Revolution in February 1894. Both Clement and his wife had portraits painted of them by Cecelia Beaux.

Clement died on March 26, 1913, in Atlantic City, New Jersey. He was buried at Forest Lawn Cemetery in Buffalo. Following his death, his family donated $80,000 in June 1914 to endow the "Stephen Merrell Clement Chair of Christian Methods in the School of Religion" at Yale.

=== Descendants ===
His grandchildren include Samuel Prescott Bush Clement and Stuart Holmes Clement, Jr.
