= HSBC Bank USA =

US subsidiary of multinational bank

HSBC Bank USA, N.A. HSBC USA Inc.

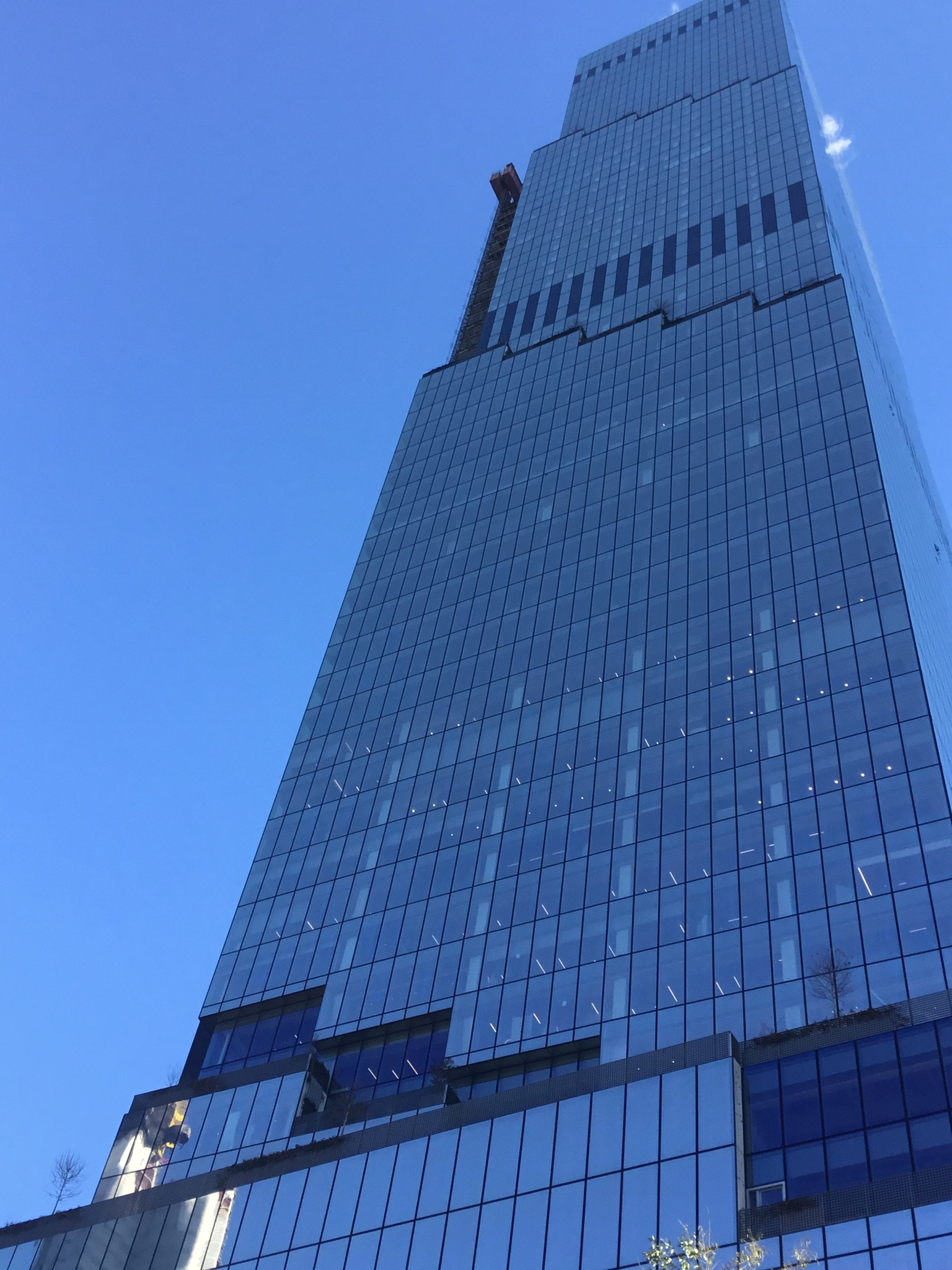
- U.S. headquarters at The Spiral in Hudson Yards
- Formerly: Hongkong and Shanghai Banking Corporation of California (1955–1979); Marine Midland Bank, N.A. (1980–1999); Marine Midland Banks Inc. (1929–1995); HSBC Americas (1995–1999)
- Type: Subsidiary
- Industry: Finance and Insurance
- Founded: July 10, 1850; 176 years ago
- Founders: James S. Wadsworth
- Headquarters: The Spiral, 66 Hudson Boulevard, New York City, New York, U.S.
- Number of locations: Approximately 22 International Wealth Centers and branches
- Key people: Jason Henderson (chairman, president, and CEO)
- Products: Financial services
- Parent: HSBC
- Website: www.us.hsbc.com

HSBC Bank USA, National Association, an American subsidiary of the British banking group HSBC, is a bank with its operational head office in New York City and its nominal head office in Tysons, Virginia (as designated on its charter). HSBC Bank USA, N.A. is a national bank chartered under the National Bank Act, and thus is regulated by the Office of the Comptroller of the Currency (OCC), a part of the U.S. Department of the Treasury.

Although this company was established in 1850 as Marine Midland Bank, its presence dates to 1865 when HSBC entered into the American market by opening an office in San Francisco before becoming a branch in 1875. Through multiple expansions nationwide and the full acquisition of Marine Midland in 1987, the company adopted its current HSBC USA name in 1999.

In 2021, HSBC announced its exit from most U.S. mass-market retail banking operations as part of a broader strategic pivot toward wealth management, international banking, corporate banking, and institutional banking. Following the restructuring, the company retained approximately 22 International Wealth Centers and branch locations focused on internationally connected and high-net-worth clients.

In 2024, HSBC USA relocated its U.S. headquarters from 452 Fifth Avenue to The Spiral in Hudson Yards.

== History ==
=== Beginnings ===
The Hongkong and Shanghai Banking Corporation began its presence in the United States market in 1865 when it opened an office in San Francisco, California. That office became a full-fledged branch in 1875, and in 1880 the bank opened its first East Coast branch in New York City.

=== Acquisition of Marine Midland and Republic Bank ===
In 1980, HSBC acquired a 51% controlling interest in Marine Midland Bank, headquartered in Buffalo, New York. The bank's roots dated to 1850. HSBC acquired the remaining interest in 1987.

In 1994, Marine Midland acquired Spectrum Home Mortgage, which operated in eight states. In 1995, Marine Midland acquired United Northern Federal Savings Bank, with branches in Watertown and Lowville, New York. Marine Midland also acquired HSBC's six New York City retail branches, and the following year acquired Hang Seng Bank's two New York City branches.

That same year, Marine Midland acquired 11 branches from East River Savings Bank in the New York metropolitan area. Marine also acquired the U.S. dollar clearing business of JPMorgan Chase. At the same time, HSBC transferred two branches in the northwestern United States to HSBC Bank Canada. The following year, Marine completed its acquisition of First Federal Savings and Loan from Toronto-based Canada Trust for $620 million. First Federal Savings, headquartered in Rochester, had $7.2 billion in assets, 1,600 employees, 79 retail branches in New York State, and 15 mortgage origination offices across nine states.

In 1998, Marine Midland acquired First Commercial Bank of Philadelphia, which had $90 million in assets and $78 million in deposits across two branches serving the Asian-American community, for $23.75 million.

In 1999, the company acquired Republic New York for $10.3 billion and moved its headquarters from One HSBC Center in Buffalo to the HSBC Tower on Fifth Avenue in Manhattan.

As part of HSBC's global rebranding campaign, HSBC Americas (formerly Marine Midland) was renamed HSBC Bank USA in June 1999.

=== 21st century ===
HSBC branch in Silver Spring, Maryland

In 2004, HSBC USA sold two upstate New York branches to Gloversville-based City National Bank & Trust Co. after determining it lacked sufficient nearby branch density to achieve operational scale in the market.

In July 2011, HSBC sold 195 branches in upstate New York to First Niagara Financial Group for approximately $1 billion, effectively divesting much of the legacy Marine Midland Bank retail franchise.

In 2015, the company paid $30 million to settle litigation related to overdraft fee practices.

In 2016, the Office of the Comptroller of the Currency imposed a $35 million penalty against HSBC Bank USA for deceptive billing practices and ordered restitution to affected customers.

In 2019, HSBC announced plans to selectively expand retail and wealth operations in the United States, including opening additional branches in Western New York as part of a broader initiative targeting internationally connected and affluent clients.

In February 2020, HSBC Holdings announced a major global restructuring plan involving the reduction of approximately $100 billion in assets and restructuring of its U.S. and European businesses.

In 2021, HSBC announced its exit from most U.S. mass-market retail banking operations as part of a broader strategic pivot toward Asia, wealth management, and corporate and institutional banking.

On May 26, 2021, HSBC formally announced that it would sell and wind down much of its U.S. retail branch network while retaining a limited number of locations focused on international wealth and corporate banking clients.

In April 2022, Citizens Bank completed the acquisition of 80 HSBC branches located in New York City, New Jersey, Pennsylvania, Washington, D.C., Maryland, Virginia, and Florida. HSBC's West Coast branch operations were sold to Cathay Bank, while additional branches were closed as part of the restructuring.

Following the restructuring, HSBC retained approximately two dozen U.S. locations, many of which were converted into International Wealth Centers serving internationally connected and high-net-worth clients.

The restructuring also marked a broader strategic repositioning of HSBC USA toward corporate and institutional banking activities and away from mass-market consumer banking.

In 2024, HSBC USA relocated its U.S. headquarters from 452 Fifth Avenue to The Spiral in Hudson Yards, Manhattan.

== Operations ==
HSBC branch in Surfside, Florida in 2014

HSBC USA operates through several principal business lines, including Corporate and Institutional Banking (CIB), International Wealth and Premier Banking, Global Private Banking, Markets and Securities Services, transaction banking, and treasury services.

HSBC maintains offices, wealth centers, and operational facilities across major U.S. metropolitan markets including New York City, Buffalo, Washington, D.C., Miami, San Francisco, Beverly Hills, Silicon Valley, Seattle, Boston, Scarsdale, New Hyde Park, and Aventura.

New York City serves as HSBC’s primary U.S. corporate and institutional banking center and houses senior management, investment banking, markets, securities services, treasury, and wealth management operations. HSBC Securities (USA) Inc., the bank’s U.S. broker-dealer, lists its principal office in New York City.

HSBC maintains a significant presence in San Francisco, reflecting the bank’s longstanding historical connection to California dating back to 1865. The bank operates a San Francisco Wealth Center and also maintains a Silicon Valley presence focused on internationally connected technology, innovation, and growth economy clients.

HSBC continues to maintain historical operational ties to Buffalo, New York through its legacy Marine Midland Bank operations. Buffalo historically served as HSBC’s U.S. headquarters prior to the relocation to Manhattan following the acquisition of Republic New York in 1999.

=== Corporate and institutional banking ===
HSBC USA maintains a significant corporate and institutional banking platform through HSBC Corporate and Institutional Banking (CIB). The division provides banking and financial services to multinational corporations, financial institutions, institutional investors, sovereign entities, and internationally focused businesses operating in the United States and abroad.

The division provides lending, debt capital markets, leveraged and project finance, treasury management, liquidity solutions, commercial payments, trade finance, receivables and supply chain finance, foreign exchange services, securities services, custody, clearing, structured products, correspondent banking services, and commercial card services.

HSBC USA focuses heavily on internationally connected clients and cross-border banking activity, particularly involving trade corridors between the United States, Asia, Europe, Latin America, and the Middle East. The bank supports corporate clients through financing, transaction banking, cash management, and foreign exchange services tied to international operations and global commerce.

HSBC Securities (USA) Inc. serves as HSBC’s primary U.S. broker-dealer subsidiary and supports fixed income, foreign exchange, securities financing, derivatives, and capital markets-related activities.

In 2025, HSBC announced plans to exit portions of its U.S. business banking portfolio serving smaller and medium-sized businesses as part of a broader global simplification strategy focused on internationally connected and higher-return client segments.

=== International wealth and private banking ===
Following the restructuring of its retail banking operations, HSBC retained a smaller branch and wealth center network in the United States focused on affluent, internationally connected, and high-net-worth clients. HSBC USA operates International Wealth Centers in major metropolitan markets including New York City, San Francisco, Los Angeles, Miami, Washington, D.C., Silicon Valley, Boston, Seattle, and the Buffalo area.

These locations primarily focus on internationally mobile clients, foreign nationals living or working in the United States, globally connected entrepreneurs, and affluent customers requiring cross-border banking services.

The bank also maintains a U.S. Global Private Banking business serving ultra-high-net-worth individuals, family offices, business owners, and internationally active wealthy clients. Services include portfolio management, lending, wealth structuring, private banking credit, international investment services, and cross-border wealth advisory services.

=== Operations and technology ===
HSBC USA works with OneSpan to issue multi-factor authentication security devices and authentication technology for online banking and digital financial services.

The bank maintains substantial compliance, anti-money laundering, sanctions monitoring, cybersecurity, and risk management infrastructure within the United States. Following the bank’s 2012 anti-money laundering settlement, HSBC significantly expanded its financial crime compliance, internal controls, transaction surveillance, and regulatory oversight operations.

HSBC USA also supports portions of HSBC’s global technology, operational resiliency, and back-office infrastructure, including functions tied to payments processing, financial crime monitoring, treasury services, institutional banking support, and international transaction operations.

=== Branding and sponsorships ===
HSBC Bank USA held the naming rights to the arena that houses the Buffalo Sabres, known as HSBC Arena from 1999 to 2011. Following HSBC's sale of much of its upstate New York retail branch network in 2011, the arena was renamed First Niagara Center and later became KeyBank Center in 2016 after KeyBank acquired First Niagara.

HSBC also sponsored airport infrastructure in the United States, including branding on jet bridges at John F. Kennedy International Airport in New York City. The sponsorship arrangement began in 2006 and expired in 2022, after which American Express acquired naming rights to portions of the terminal infrastructure.

== Controversies ==
In 2010, HSBC was rated the worst in customer advocacy by Forrester Research, which asked bank customers to rank their banks. In the national survey of approximately 4,500 banking customers assessing the top 50 banks, HSBC received a 16% rating in response to the question: "My financial provider does what’s best for me, not just its own bottom line," down 10 percentage points from the previous year.

=== Money laundering and sanctions violations ===
In 2012, HSBC Holdings and HSBC Bank USA entered into a deferred prosecution agreement with U.S. authorities after investigations found longstanding anti-money laundering and sanctions compliance failures within the bank's operations.

According to the United States Department of Justice, HSBC failed to maintain an effective anti-money laundering program and permitted at least $881 million in drug trafficking proceeds to move through the U.S. financial system. U.S. authorities also stated that HSBC violated sanctions laws by facilitating transactions involving Iran, Sudan, Libya, Cuba, and Burma.

The investigation found that HSBC's Mexican affiliate, HSBC Mexico, transferred large volumes of U.S. dollar banknotes to HSBC Bank USA despite warnings regarding the risks of money laundering associated with Mexican drug trafficking organizations. Investigators additionally found weaknesses in transaction monitoring, suspicious activity reporting, and internal compliance controls.

As part of the settlement, HSBC agreed to pay approximately $1.9 billion in fines, forfeitures, and penalties. The bank also agreed to extensive compliance reforms, ongoing monitoring, and enhanced anti-money laundering oversight requirements.

Following the settlement, HSBC significantly expanded its financial crime compliance infrastructure, including sanctions screening, transaction surveillance systems, internal audit functions, and anti-money laundering staffing across its global operations.

== Sponsorships ==
- Buffalo Sabres, Hockey Club (1999-2011)
- Jetbridges at John F. Kennedy International Airport(2006-2022), Miami International Airport(2012-2019), and Los Angeles International Airport(2010-2020)
