= WPCS =

WPCS may refer to:

- WPCS International, an engineering firm based in Exton, Pennsylvania, United States
- WPCS (FM), a radio station (89.5 FM) licensed to Pensacola, Florida, United States
- West Pictou Consolidated School, a K-8 public school in Nova Scotia, Canada

== See also ==
- WPC (disambiguation)
