= Williams-Butler Mansion =

19th-century mansion in Buffalo, New York

The Williams-Butler House
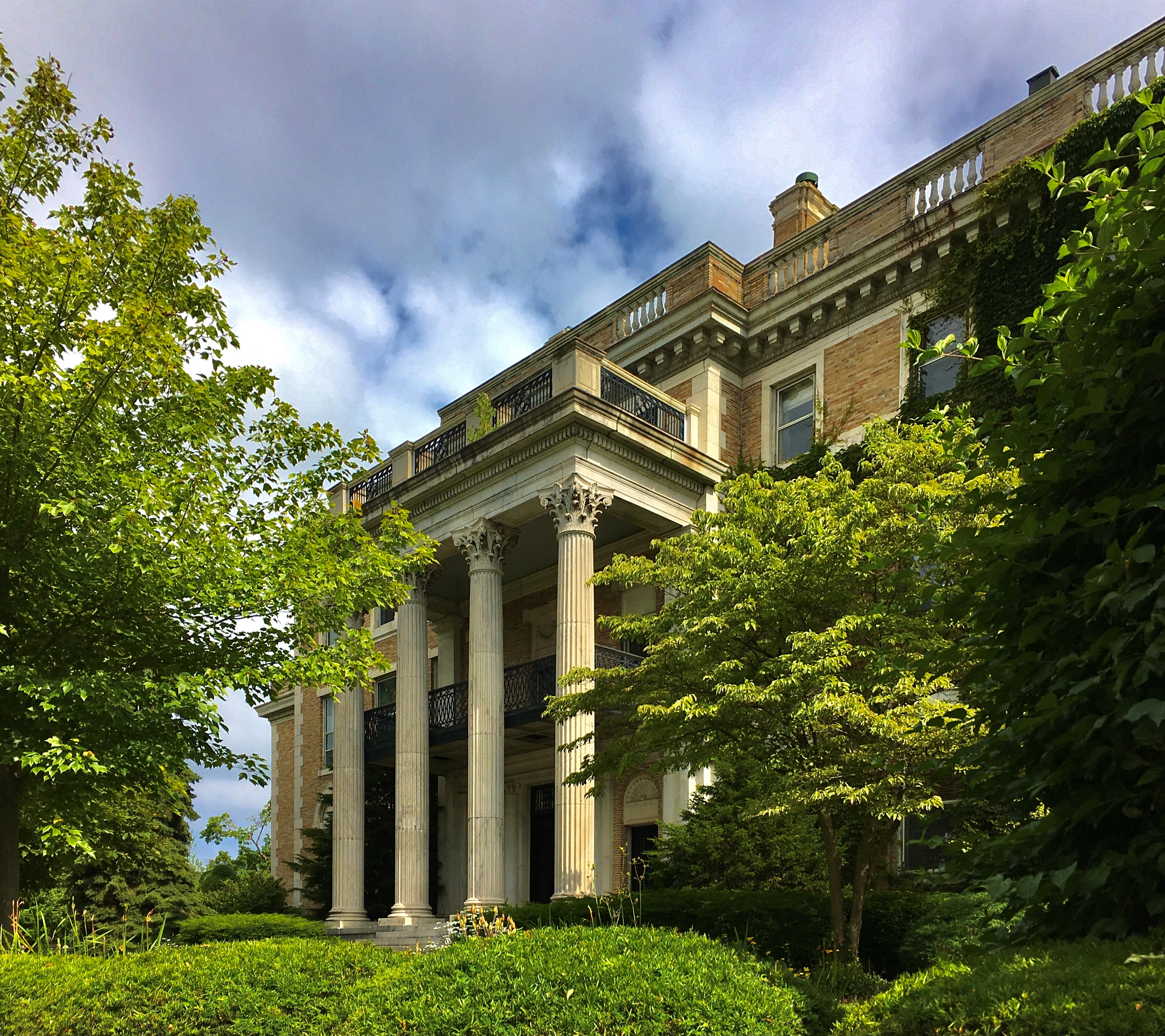
- The Williams-Butler House, July 2017
- Interactive map of the The Williams-Butler House area

General information
- Architectural style: Georgian Revival
- Location: 672 Delaware Avenue, Buffalo, NY
- Coordinates: 42°54′09″N 78°52′25″W
- Construction started: 1896
- Completed: June 1899
- Owner: Douglas Development

Technical details
- Floor area: 21,000 sq. ft.

Design and construction
- Architect: Stanford White of McKim, Mead and White

The Williams-Butler House, also known as the Jacobs Executive Development Center, is a roughly 16,000 sq. ft. mansion located in Buffalo, New York, that was built between 1896 and 1899. The house was designed by architect Stanford White of the New York firm of McKim, Mead and White for George L. Williams and his wife Annie. The building is a contributing property to the Delaware Avenue Historic District designated in 1974.

== History ==
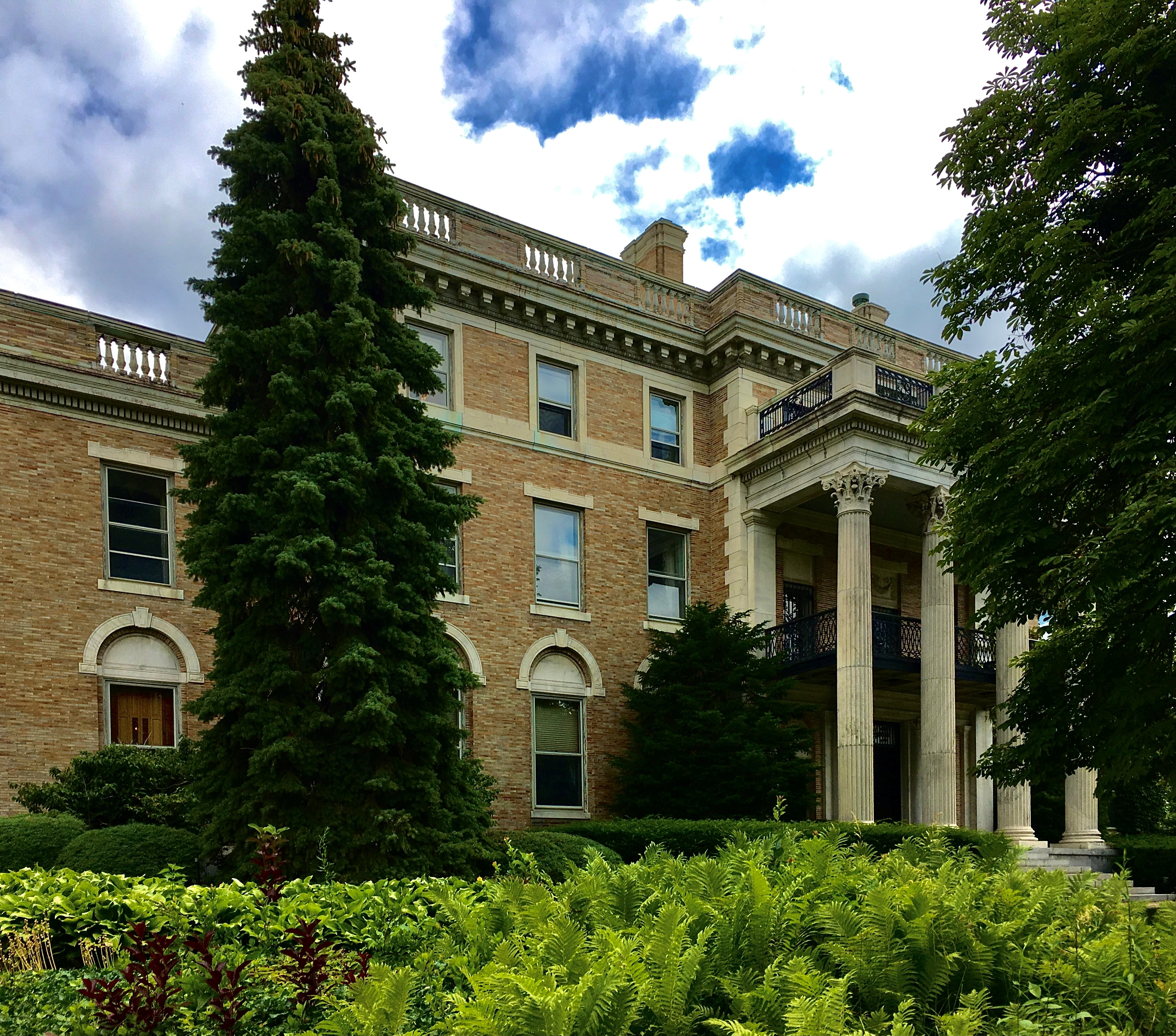
The Williams-Butler House, July 2017

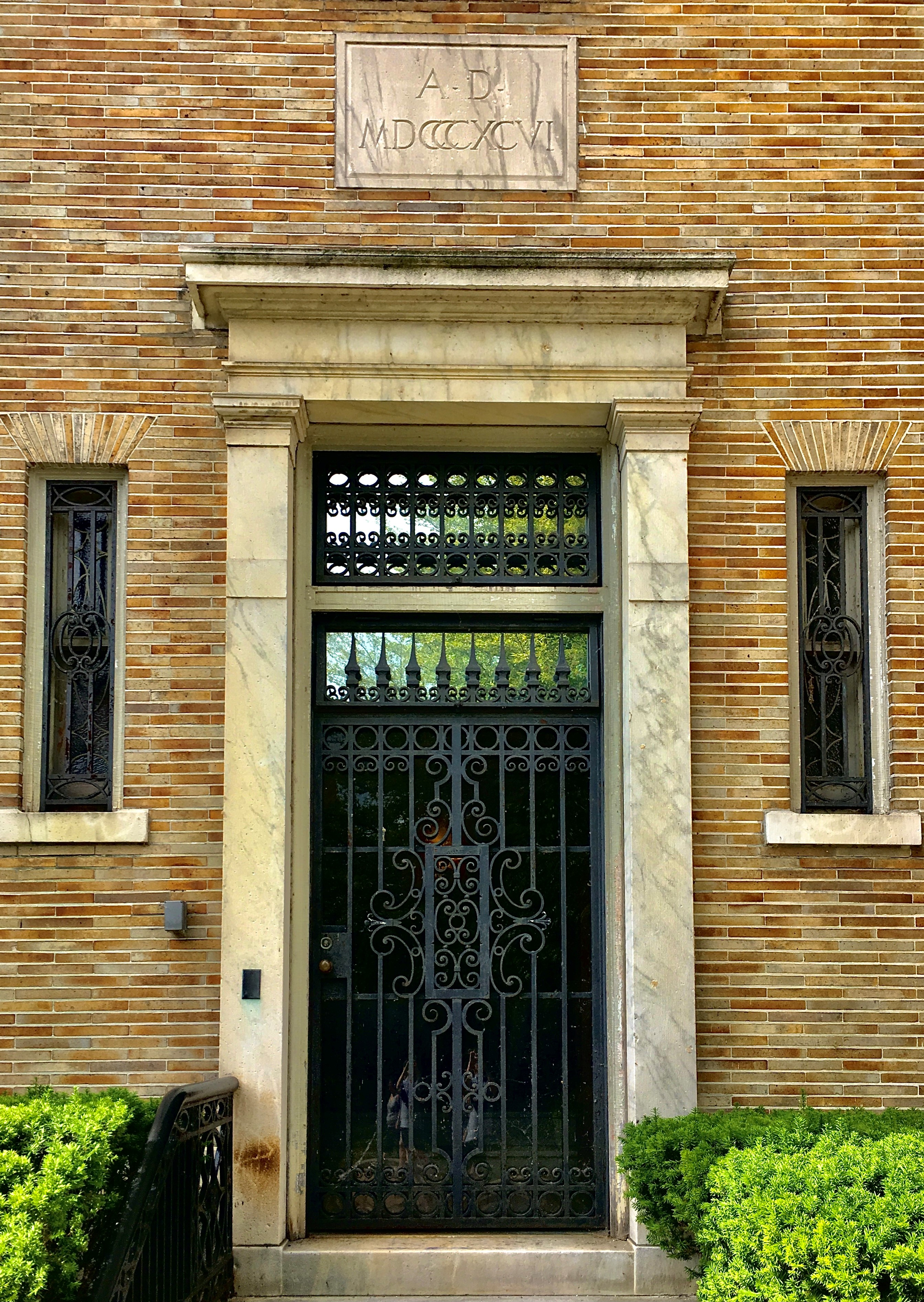
The Williams-Butler House, July 2017

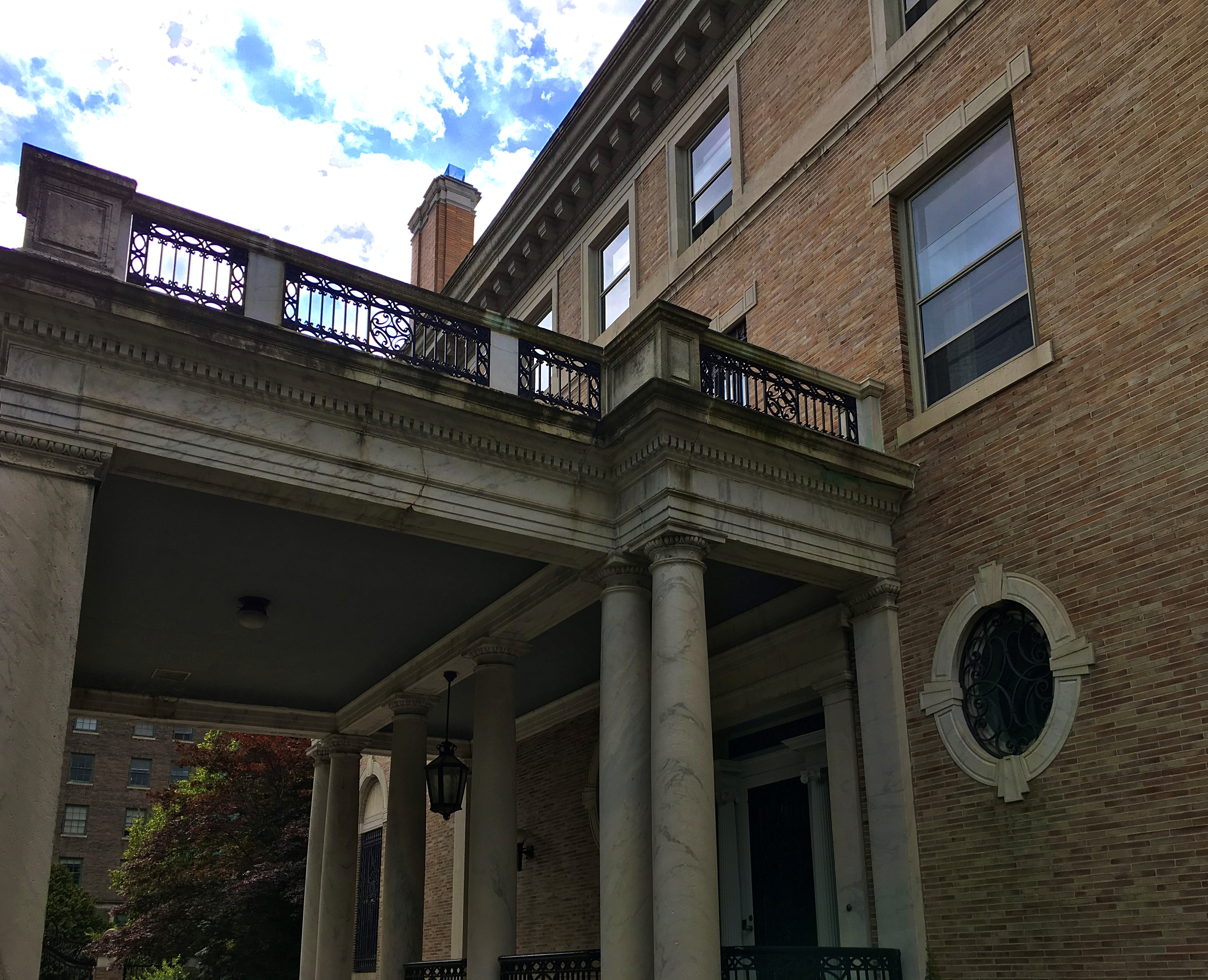
The Porte-cochère, July 2017

In the 1890s, George L. Williams and his wife Annie commissioned New York architect Stanford White of the prestigious McKim, Mead and White firm to design a new home for them at the corner of Delaware Avenue and North Street in Buffalo, which at the time, had views of Lake Erie. Williams was a successful banker with the Erie County Savings Bank.

White had previously worked in Buffalo as associate architect to Henry Hobson Richardson when he designed the Buffalo State Hospital in 1870. White returned to Buffalo to design a shingle style residence for Erzelia Metcalfe at 125 North Street in 1884 (commissioned in July 1882), next door to the plot that Williams later had their home built. The Metcalfe house was designed three years after White had joined McKim and Mead. White also designed a house for William's brother, Charles Williams, on the other side of the mansion located at 690 Delaware Avenue. George and Charles were sons of industrialist Gibson T. Williams, and had owned what was reputedly the largest tannery in the United States in Salamanca.

To build the 40-room home, which cost approximately $250,000, Williams tore down the Aaron Rumsey mansion which had been on the site since roughly 1856.

=== Butler family ===
Six years after the home was finished, Williams left Buffalo and sold the mansion to Edward Hubert Butler Sr., publisher of The Buffalo Evening News. After Butler died in 1914, the house and the newspaper were inherited by his son, Edward Hubert Butler Jr. who lived in the home until his death in 1956. Both the paper and the house were inherited by his wife, Kate Robinson Butler, who lived there until her death in 1974, after which the house was sold to the William C. Baird Foundation and the newspaper was sold to Warren Buffett in 1976.

=== Recent owners ===
The William C. Baird Foundation subsequently gave the house to the Roswell Park Hospital. In 1979, Roswell sold the house and the adjoining Metcalfe House on North Street to Delaware North Companies. After a heated preservation battle, Delaware North demolished the Metcalfe House in 1980 for use as a parking lot. The Metropolitan Museum of Art salvaged the complete entryway of the Metcalfe House which it has on permanent display in its museum in New York City. In addition, the Burchfield Penney Art Center at Buffalo State College rebuilt the Metcalfe House's dining room and library in Rockwell Hall.

Delaware North renovated the house at a cost of $6 million before selling it to Varity Corp. in 1990 to serve as its world headquarters. Varity removed the parking lot and installed a garden and lighted fountain located in a granite courtyard. Varity was later acquired by a Cleveland Co., who sold the home back to Delaware North in 1999. In 2000, Delaware North CEO, Jeremy Jacobs then deeded the property to the University at Buffalo, who operated the house as the Jacobs Executive Development Center. In December 2022, the property was sold to Douglas Jemal and his Douglas Development company.

== See also ==
- Delaware Avenue Historic District (Buffalo, New York)
- Architecture of Buffalo, New York
