= Westminster Presbyterian Church =

Westminster Presbyterian Church may refer to:

- Westminster Presbyterian Church of Australia

Or it may refer to individual church buildings and/or congregations:

== in Canada ==
- Westminster Presbyterian Church (Ottawa)

== in the United States ==
- Westminster Presbyterian Church (Albany)
- Westminster Presbyterian Church (Alexandria, Virginia)
- Westminster Presbyterian Church (Atlanta), led by Peter Marshall (preacher) from 1933 to 1937
- Westminster Presbyterian Church (Buffalo, New York) (1858)
- Westminster Presbyterian Church (Columbus, Ohio)
- Westminster Presbyterian Church (Dayton)
- Westminster Presbyterian Church (Devils Lake, North Dakota), listed on the U.S. National Register of Historic Places (NRHP)
- Westminster Presbyterian Church (Los Angeles)
- Westminster Presbyterian Church (Minneapolis, Minnesota), NRHP-listed
- Westminster Presbyterian Church (Sacramento, California), NRHP-listed
- Westminster Presbyterian Church (Topeka, Kansas), NRHP-listed
- Westminster Presbyterian Church and Cemetery, a former church and current NRHP-listed site in Baltimore, Maryland
