= Wireless Power & Communication =

WPC Wireless power & Communication AS
- Industry: Electronics
- Founded: 2003
- Founder: Geir Olav Gyland
- Headquarters: Kristiansand, Norway
- Number of employees: 11 (2021)
- Website: www.wpc.no

Wireless Power & Communication is a company that has developed a patented technology for wireless transmission of power. Transmission of several hundred watts and efficiency of up to 95% makes this technology unique. The technology has been implemented in offshore products used both in hazardous areas and subsea.

WPC was founded by Geir Olav Gyland in 2003 and is based in Kristiansand, Norway. The main focus of WPC is licensing and integration of technology for wireless transmission of power to all kinds of products.

The company was in 2008 nominated by Innovation Norway to Reodorprisen.

In 2010 the TX40 and CX40, Ex approved torched and charger based on inductive charging, was nominated ONS 2010 Innovator.

== See also ==
- Inductive charging
- Inductive coupling
- Near field
- Wireless energy transfer
