= Delaware Avenue Historic District (Buffalo, New York) =

Historic district in New York, United States

- U.S. National Register of Historic Places
- U.S. Historic district
- New York State Register of Historic Places
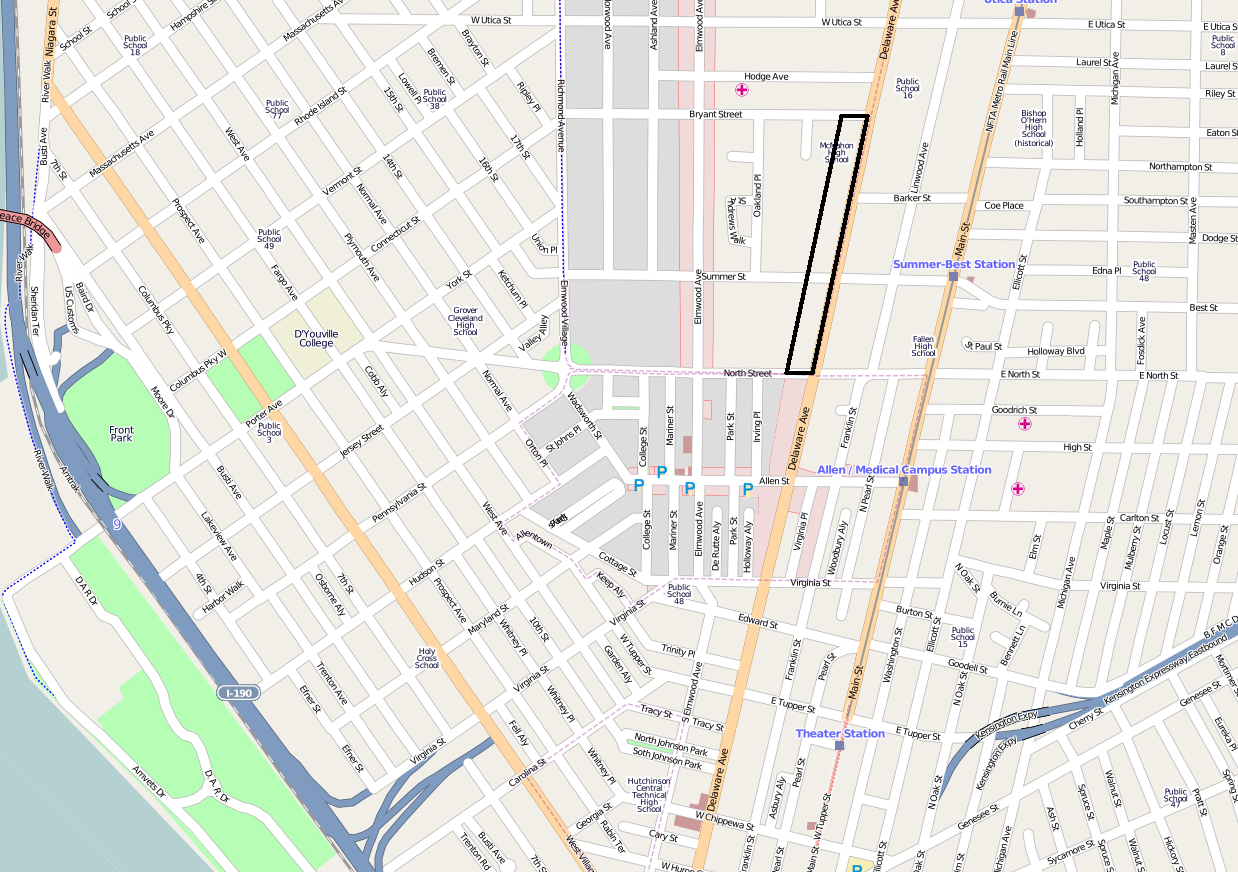
- Greater Buffalo American Red Cross Building

- Location within New York Location within the United States
- Location: W side of Delaware Ave. between North and Bryant Sts., Buffalo, New York
- Coordinates: 42°54′20″N 78°52′23″W
- Area: 15 acres (6.1 ha)
- Architects: Gilbert, Charles Pierrepont
- Architectural style: Renaissance, Gothic
- NRHP reference No.: 74001232

Significant dates
- Added to NRHP: January 17, 1974
- Designated NYSRHP: June 23, 1980

Delaware Avenue Historic District is a national historic district located at Buffalo, New York, United States, and Erie County. It is located along the west side of Delaware Avenue (New York State Route 384) between North Street to the South and Bryant Street to the North.

== History ==
When listed on the National Register of Historic Places in 1974, the district encompassed 17 contributing buildings and 1 contributing structure, earning the nickname Millionaires' Mile. The mansions were built between about 1890 and World War I and reflect Renaissance Revival and Gothic Revival style architecture.

=== Notable extant buildings ===
Notable buildings include:

- 599 Delaware Avenue - former Temple Beth Zion (1890-1961) by Kent, Tiffany Stained Glass (currently 805 Delaware Avenue)
- 672 Delaware Avenue - The Williams-Butler House (1896) by McKim, Mead & White
- 690 Delaware Avenue - The Williams-Pratt House (1896) by McKim, Mead & White
- 724 Delaware Avenue - The Westminster Presbyterian Church (1859) by Harlow W. Wilcox
- 786 Delaware Avenue - The Clement House (1914) by Edward Brodhead Green (now Greater Buffalo American Red Cross Building)
- 800 Delaware Avenue - The Mrs. Seymour H. Knox House (1915) by C. P. H. Gilbert (formerly 806 Delaware Avenue)
- 805 Delaware Avenue - Temple Beth Zion (1967) by Max Abramovitz, Ben Shahn Stained Glass (formerly 599 Delaware Avenue)
- 830 Delaware Avenue - The George Brewster Mathews House (1901)
- 844 Delaware Avenue - The Thomas B. Lockwood House (1888)
- 864 Delaware Avenue - The Harlow C. Curtiss House (1898) by Esenwein & Johnson (today the International Institute of Buffalo)
- 888 Delaware Avenue - The Charles W. Goodyear House (1903) by E.B. Green (formerly Bishop McMahon High School and Oracle Charter School)

It was listed on the National Register of Historic Places in 1974.

== Gallery ==
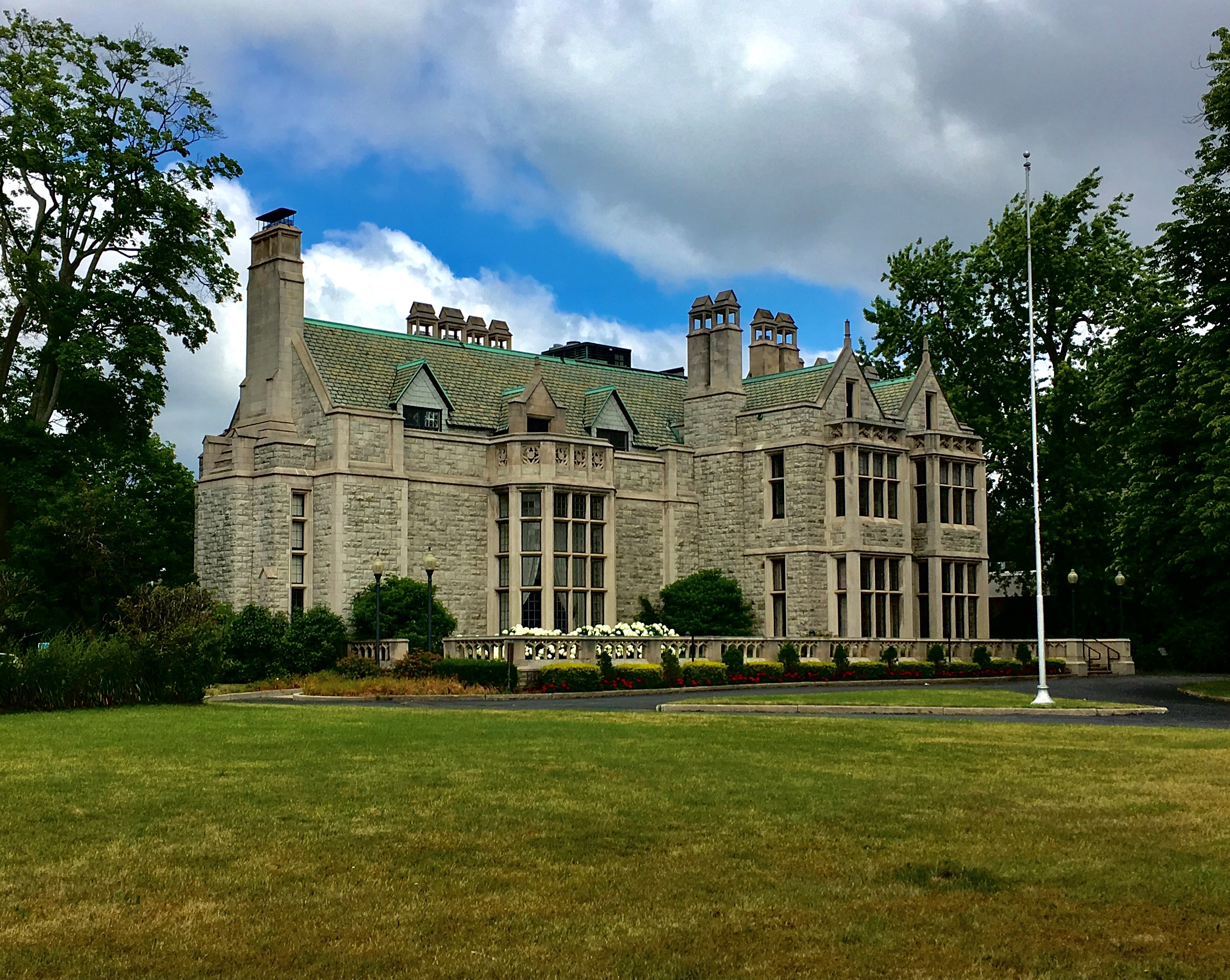
The Clement House by Edward Brodhead Green

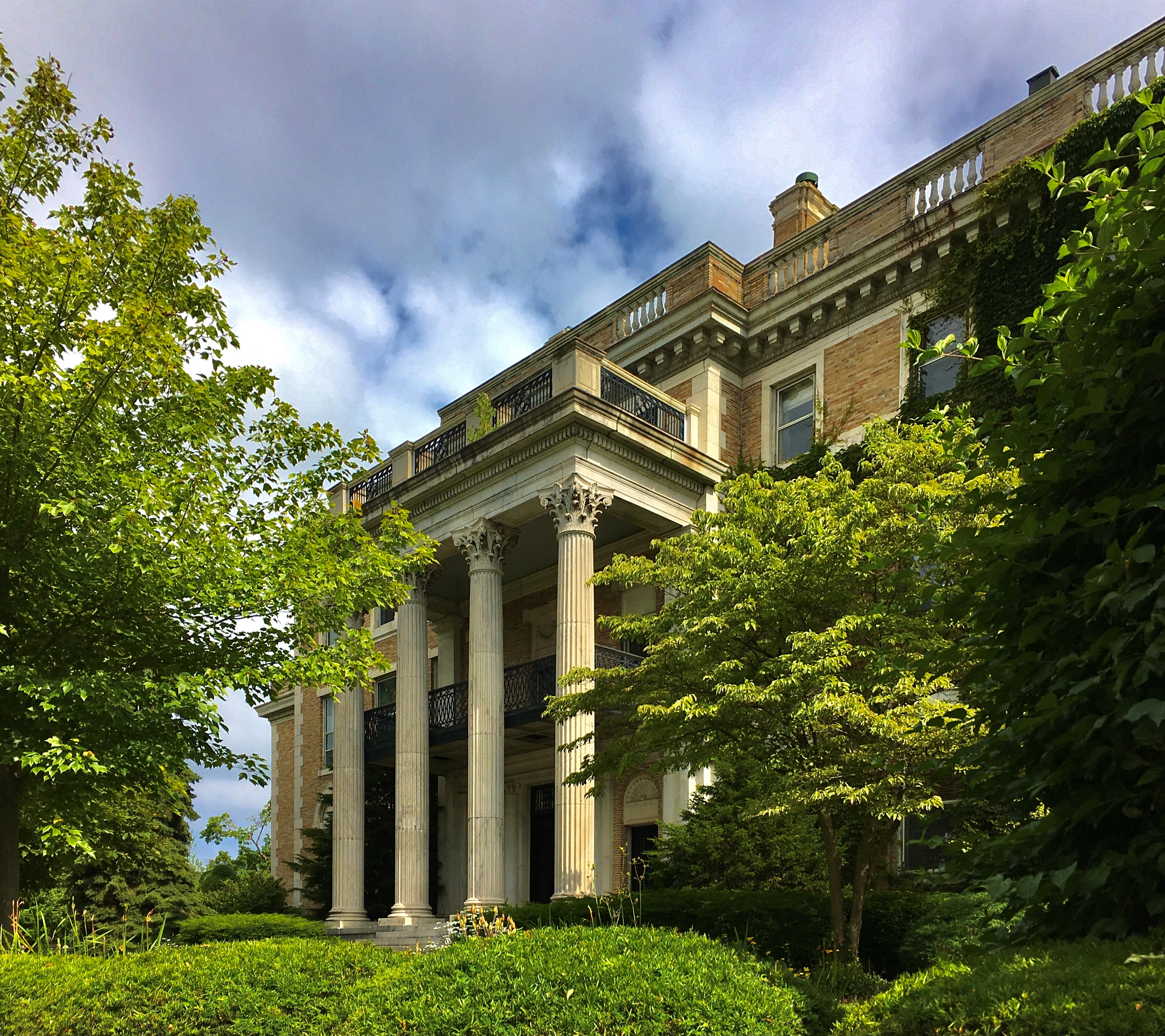
The Williams-Butler House (1894) by McKim, Mead & White

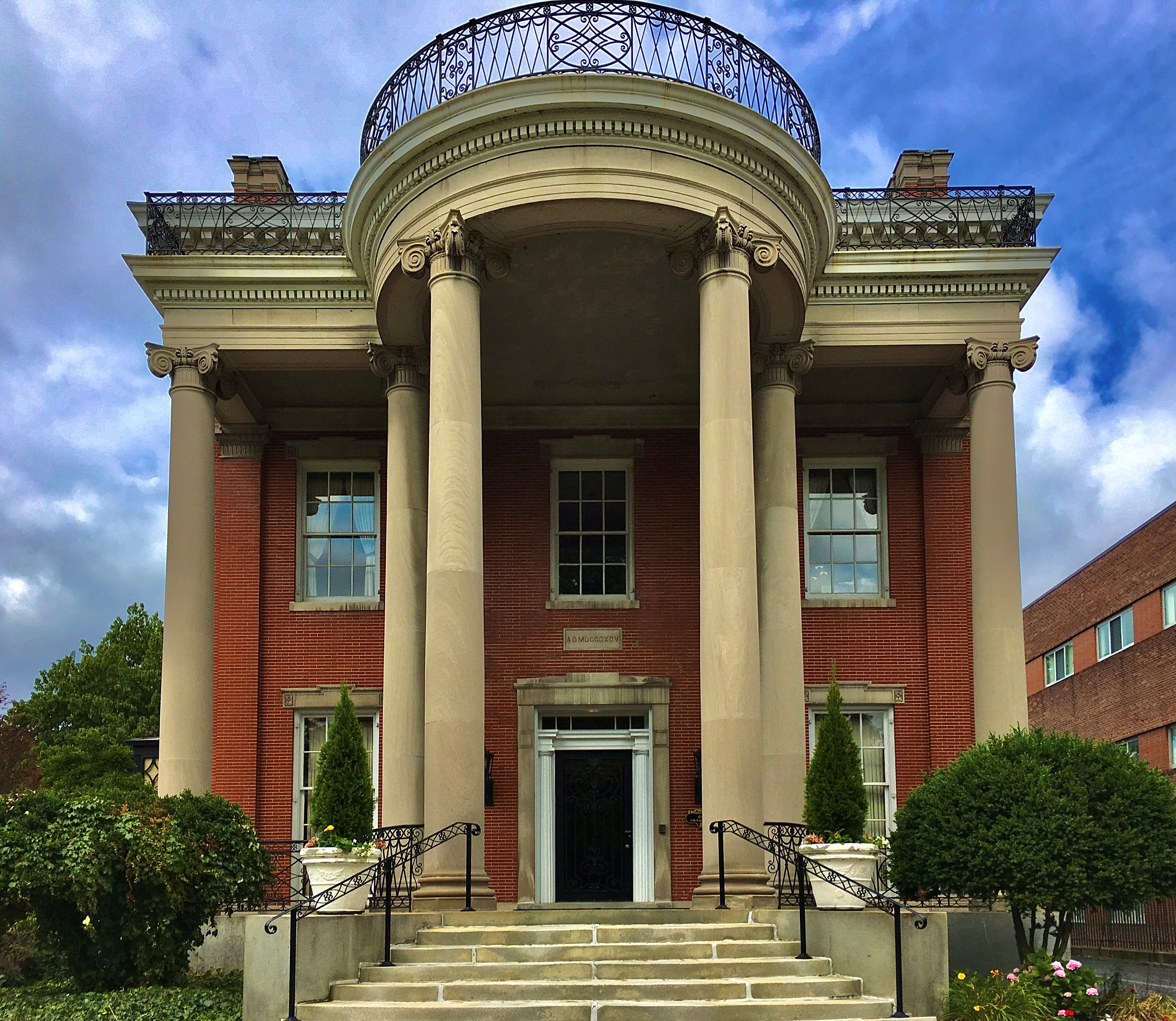
The Williams-Pratt House (1896) by McKim, Mead & White

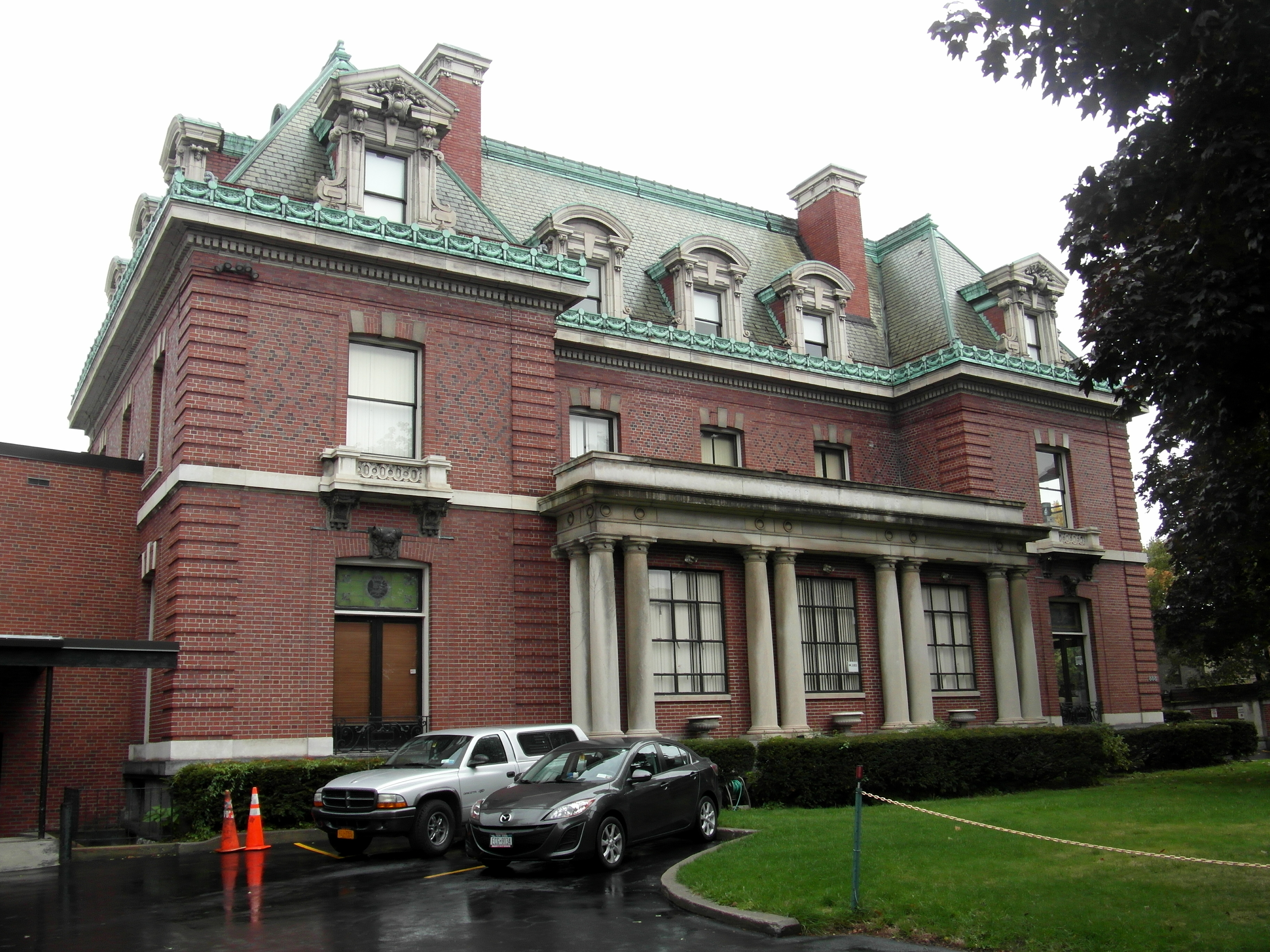
The Charles W. Goodyear House by Green & Wicks

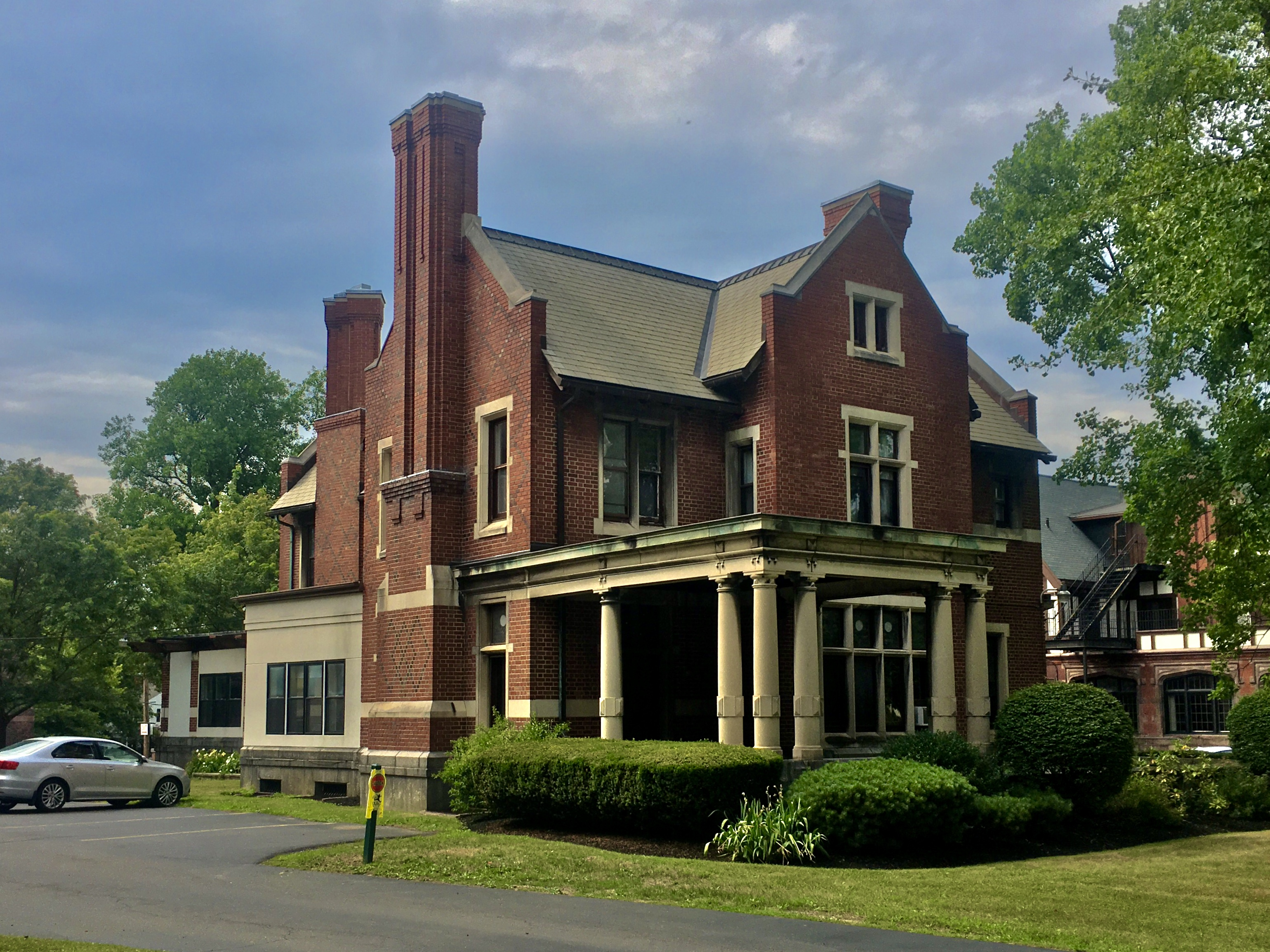
George B. Mathews House

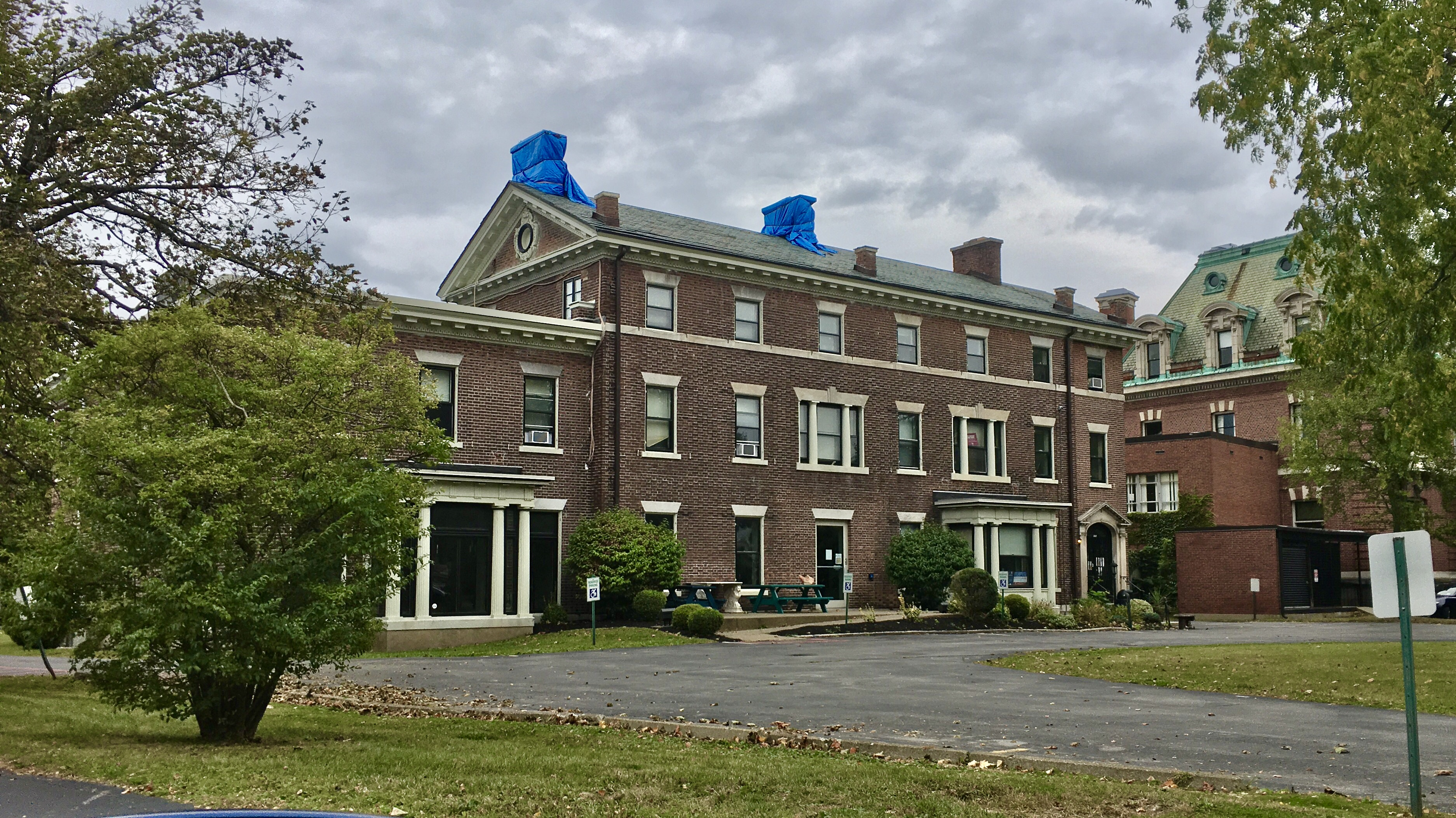
Harlow C. Curtiss House

== Demolished residences ==
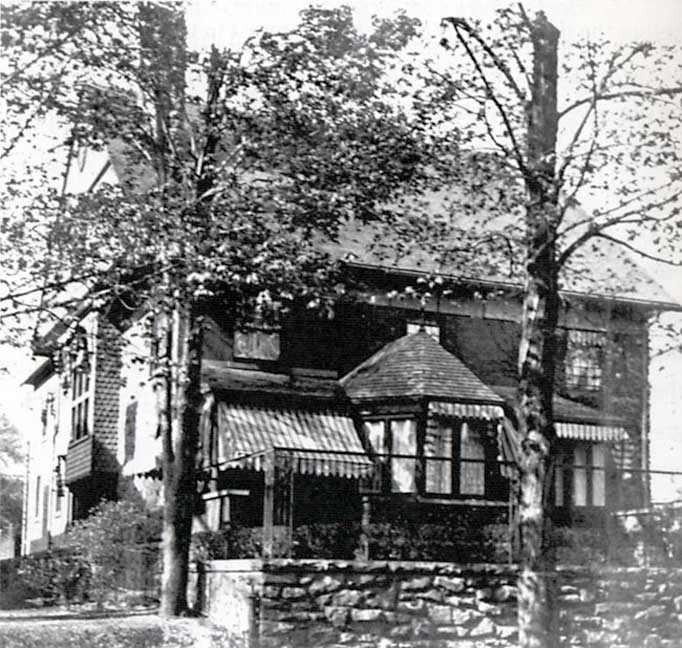
The Erzelia Metcalfe House (1884) by McKim, Mead & White

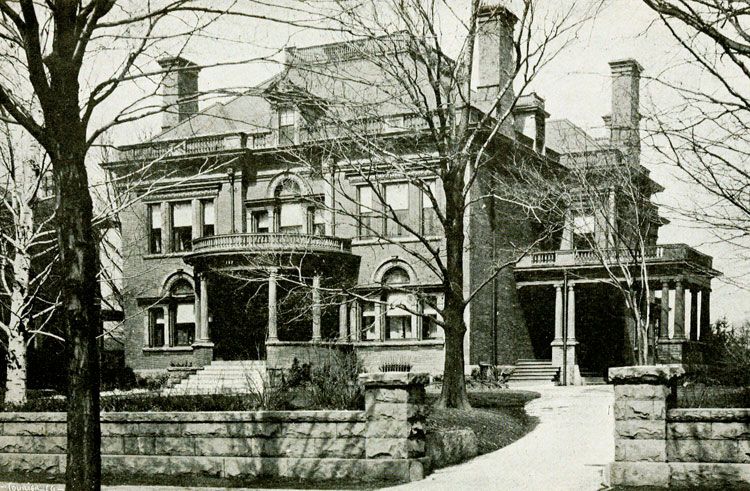
The Edmund B. Hayes House (1892) by E. B. Green

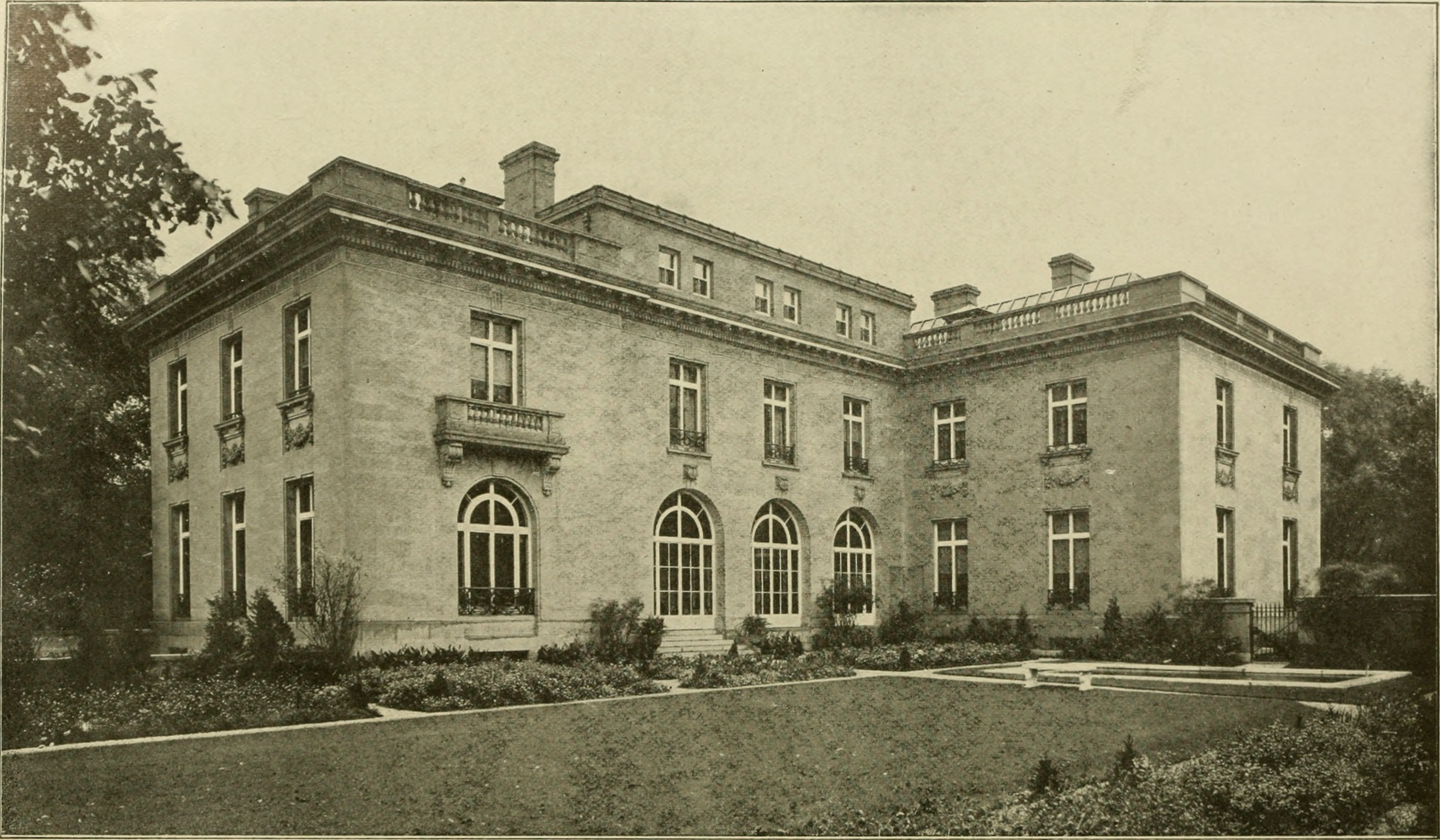
The Frank H. Goodyear House (1904) by Carrère and Hastings

== See also ==
- National Register of Historic Places listings in Erie County, New York
