= John Yurtchuk =

Economist, businessman, developer, and philanthropist

John R. Yurtchuk (born May 14, 1955) is an economist, businessman, developer, and philanthropist based out of Western New York.

== Education ==
Yurtchuk completed all of his Ph.D. course work at the University at Buffalo, where he also earned his B.A. and M.A. in economics.

== Early career ==
Early in his career, Yurtchuk worked as a Wall Street banker with Irving Trust Company and taught as a college instructor in economics and business at various institutions of higher learning.

== Business career ==
In 1990, Yurtchuk founded Matrix Development Corporation, through which he developed a wide range of commercial, medical, industrial, and residential projects in Western New York, the New York City metropolitan area, Florida, and Rhode Island. He and a partner acquired Calspan Corporation from General Dynamics in 2005. Headquartered in Buffalo, New York, Calspan specializes in aerospace and defense testing.

In March of 2023, TransDigm Group, a Cleveland-based aerospace company, acquired Calspan for $725 million.

== Board memberships ==
In 2019, Yurtchuk was appointed to the board of the National Trust for the Humanities, where he has served as treasurer and most recently chair. This philanthropic organization supports the National Endowment for the Humanities.

He is the Chairman of the Daemen University Board of Trustees, as well as the Buffalo Philharmonic Orchestra Board of Trustees.

== Charity work ==
Yurtchuk is a former chairman of the Board of Trustees of the Western New York Chapter of the American Red Cross and was a Founding Member of the American Red Cross’ National Loyalty Circle Leadership Society, the Chairman of the Switheart Animal Alliance (which he co-founded with actress Loretta Swit), a Founding Board Member of Eyes Across America, and has served on the boards for the Albright-Knox Art Gallery and Friends for Felines.

== Awards and recognition ==
Daemen University awarded Yurtchuk the institution's highest recognition of community leaders, the Daemen University Presidential Medal, as well as an honorary Doctor of Humane Letters. Both awards recognize individuals who act as exemplary role models for alumni, students, and the community at large.

He resides in Williamsville, NY and in Ocean Ridge, FL.
