= Westminster Presbyterian Church (Buffalo, New York) =

- U.S. Historic district – Contributing property
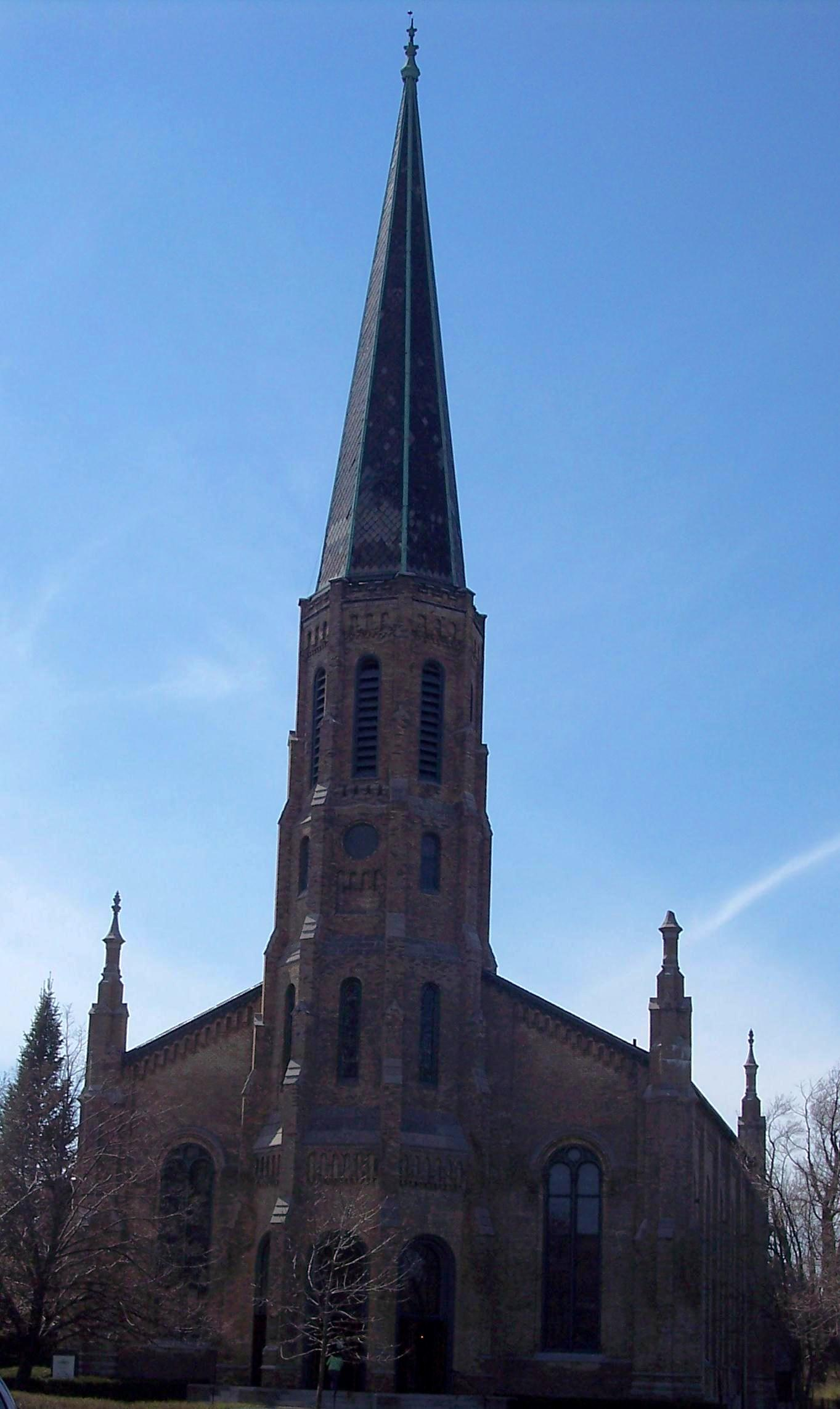
- Westminster Presbyterian, April 2011

- Location within New York Location within the United States
- Location: 724 Delaware Ave, Buffalo, New York
- Built: 1858-1859
- Architect: Harlow W. Wilcox
- Architectural style: Romanesque Revival
- Added to NRHP: 1974

The Westminster Presbyterian Church is a historic Presbyterian church located in the Delaware Avenue neighborhood of Buffalo, Erie County, New York. The church is part of the Presbytery of Western New York which is part of the Synod of the Northeast, a regional body of the Presbyterian Church (USA). The Romanesque Revival building completed in 1859 features a number of exception stained glass windows and is a contributing property to the Delaware Avenue Historic District designated in 1974.

== History ==
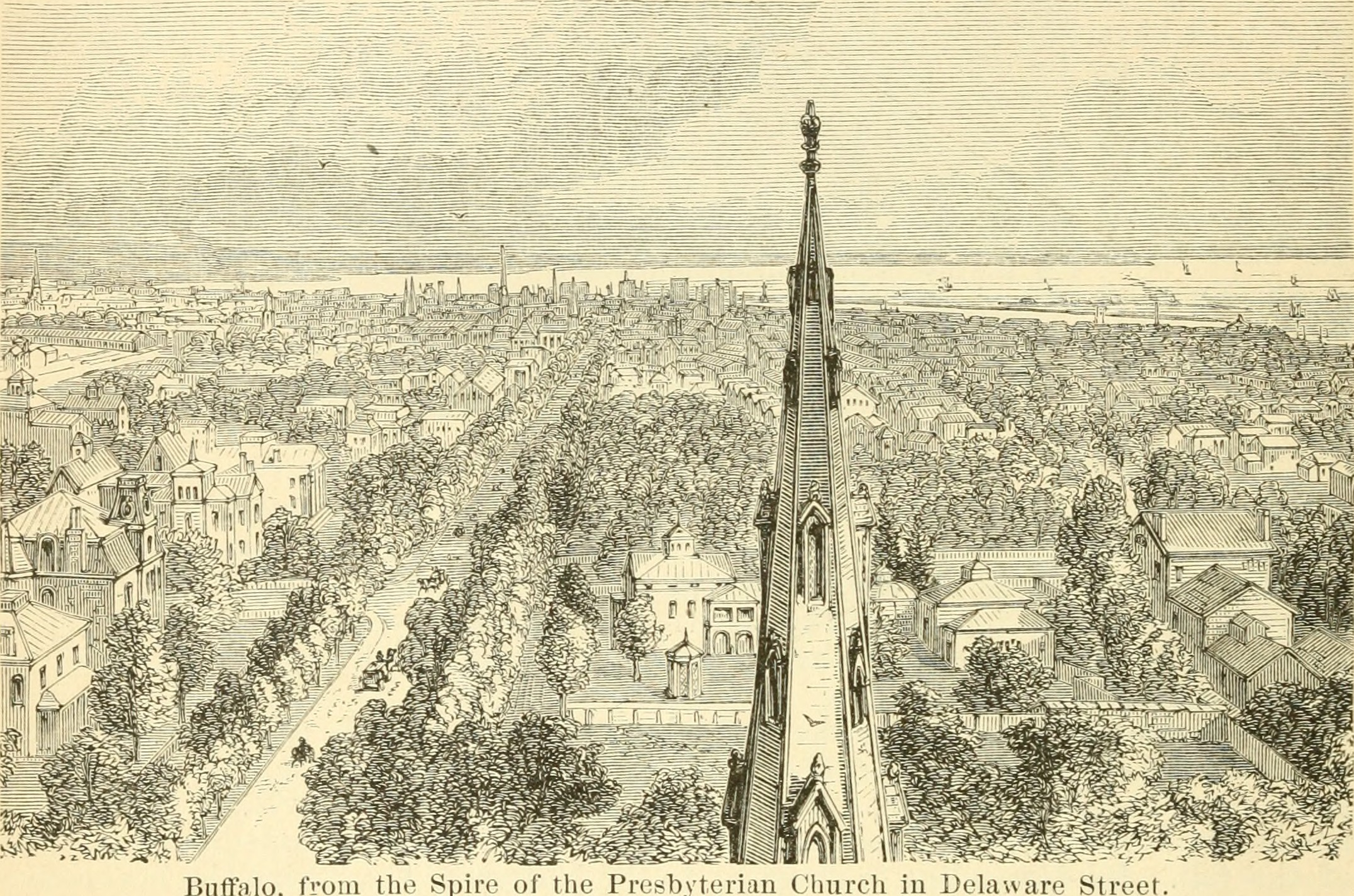
Buffalo, from the Spire of the Presbyterian Church in Delaware Street, from Appletons' Illustrated Hand-book of American Cities (1876)

On September 3, 1854, forty Buffalo residents, including Jesse Ketchum, founded Westminster Church just beyond what was then the northern boundary of Buffalo in Black Rock. Four years later on August 26, 1858, the cornerstone of what became the sanctuary of the church was laid and construction of the church completed the following year in 1859 at a total cost of $19,200. The building which was on land donated by Ketchum replaced the original parish chapel of 1847 and was designed by Buffalo architect Harlow W. Wilcox in the Romanesque Revival style and built by master mason Henry Rumrill. The exterior of the church features light yellow brick and small arches in the cornice, reminiscent of the Lombard architecture of northern Italy and a 200-foot steeple.

=== Renovations and restorations ===
In 1903, the sanctuary was renovated by Tiffany studios including replacing the church windows with opalescent Tiffany glass and changing the interior to the English Tudor Gothic style. In addition, René Théophile de Quélin stenciled Christian symbols in gold throughout including thirteen around the chancel arch, eleven in the chancel, and sixty-six on wall panels. (Note: René Théophile de Quélin (1854-1932) was the head artist for Tiffany Studios and worked closely with Louis C. Tiffany. Previously, he assisted Augustus Saint-Gaudens on decorative projects for the Vanderbilt mansion, as well as working with John La Farge.) The Parish House, resembling a Norman keep, was built in 1918 and behind the church is the restored Victorian stable originally built for the Rumsey residence.

Between 1931 and 1952, the 1903 Tiffany windows were replaced by thirty-one gothic revival stained glass windows including works by four of the leading artists: William Willet of Philadelphia and Wilber H. Burnham, Charles Jay Connick, and Joseph Reynolds of Boston. Only one of the original 1903 Tiffany windows remains, which is located on the east side of the church just south of the Delaware Avenue entrance and behind the original 1859 window on the outside. In 1954, the Tiffany Studios-stenciled Christian symbols covered. However, in 1992, the stencils around the chancel arch and chancel were restored.

In 2011, the Buffalo architectural firm of Hamilton Houston Lownie designed the West Entrance which serves to connect the campus buildings while maintaining the church's architectural integrity.

== See also ==
- Delaware Avenue Historic District (Buffalo, New York)
- Architecture of Buffalo, New York
