= Katharine Pratt Horton =

Katharine Lorenz Pratt Horton
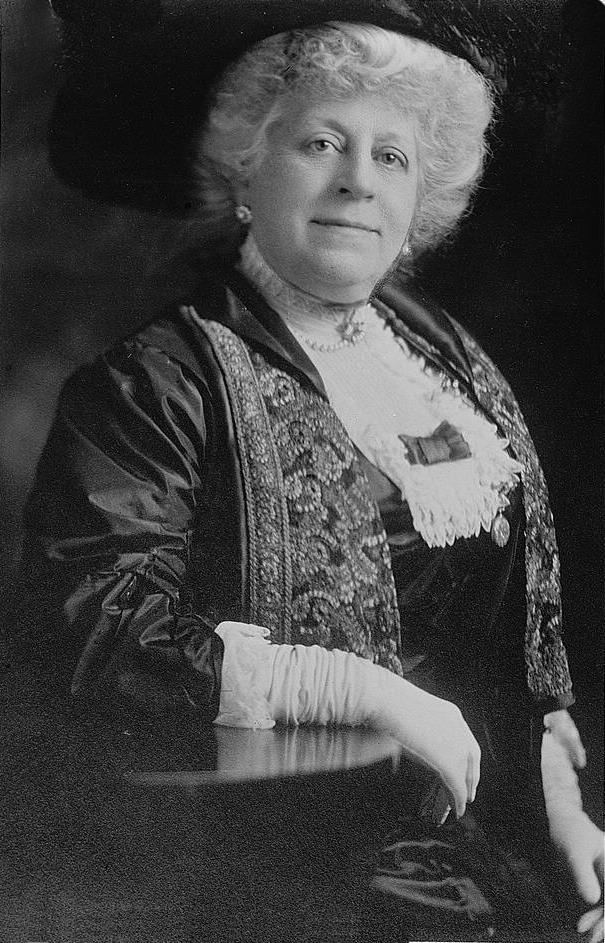
- Born: Katharine Lorenz Pratt; September 5, 1847; Buffalo, New York
- Died: August 28, 1931 (aged 83); Buffalo, New York
- Known for: President; City Federation of Women's Clubs in Buffalo, New York. Leader; Daughters of the American Revolution

Signature
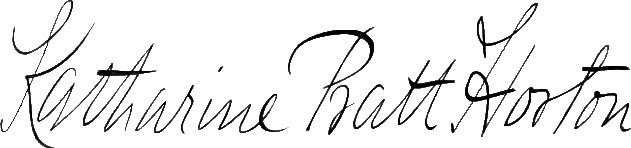

Katharine Lorenz Pratt Horton (September 5, 1847 – August 28, 1931) was the President of the City Federation of Women's Clubs in Buffalo, New York, and regent of the Buffalo, New York, chapter of the Daughters of the American Revolution from 1901 to 1930.

== Biography ==
She was born on September 5, 1847, as Katharine Lorenz Pratt, to Pascal Paoli Pratt and Phoebe Lorenz. She later married John Miller Horton (1840-1902). She was president of the City Federation of Women's Clubs; and regent of the Buffalo, New York, chapter of the Daughters of the American Revolution from 1901 to 1930. She twice ran unsuccessfully for President General of the National Daughters of the American Revolution and the Niagara Frontier Chapter of the Daughters of 1812.

She died in 1931 in Buffalo, New York.
