= Marine Midland Bank =

Defunct bank based in Buffalo, NY, USA

- The Marine Midland logo used from 1965 to 1994 (left) and the HSBC logo used to represent Marine Midland from 1994 to 1999 (right)

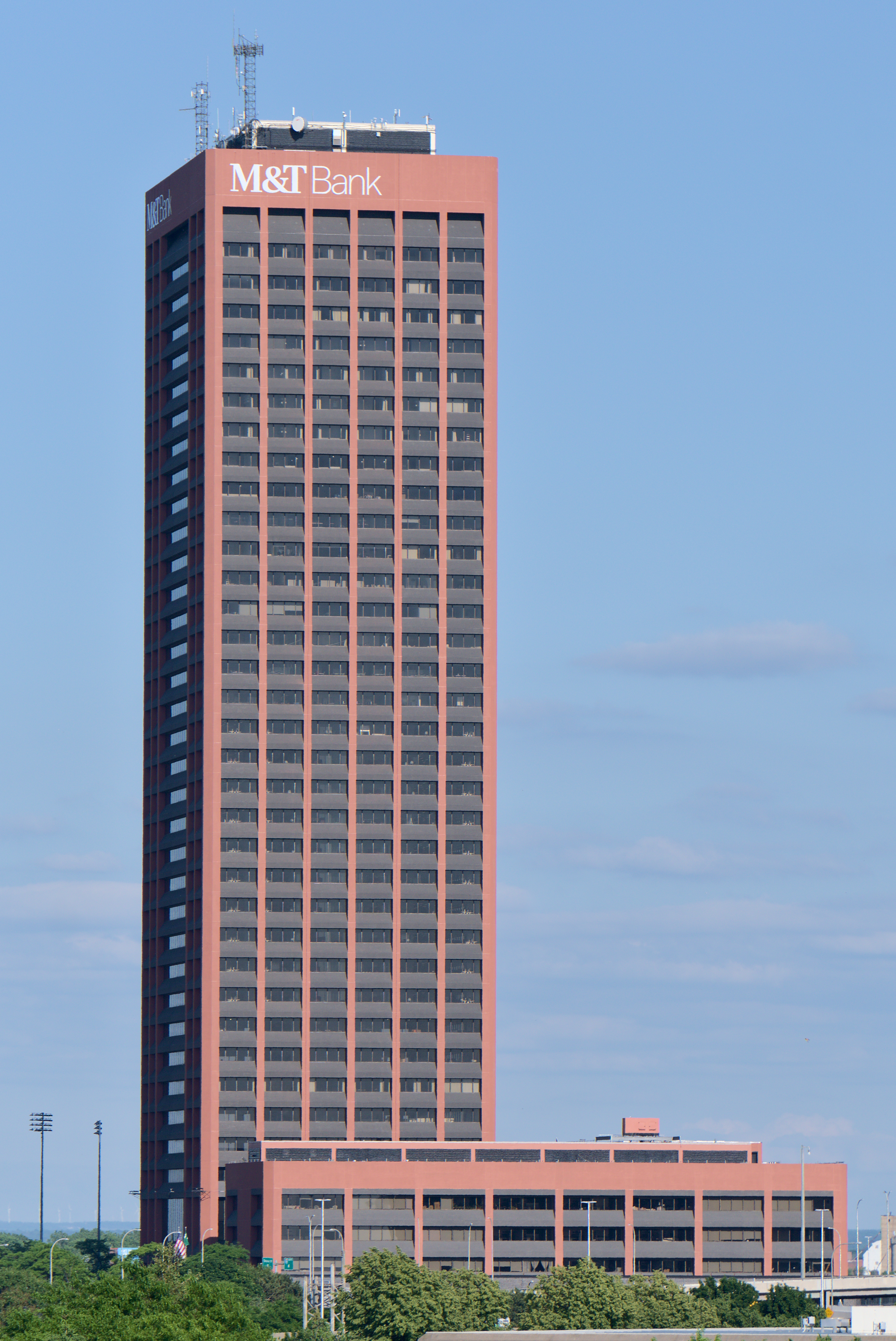
- Marine Midland headquarters in Buffalo.
- Trade name: Marine Midland Bank
- Formerly: Marine Midland Bank, N.A. (1980–1999); Marine Midland Banks Inc (1929–1995); HSBC Americas (1995–1999)
- Type: NYSE MM 1920–1987 Subsidiary of HSBC Holdings plc 1987–1999
- Industry: Finance and Insurance
- Founded: July 10, 1850; 176 years ago
- Founders: James S. Wadsworth
- Defunct: March 29, 1999; 27 years ago
- Fate: Acquired by HSBC in 1980 (51%); full ownership from 1987. Renamed HSBC Bank USA in 1999.
- Successors: Upstate New York: KeyBank; Community Bank, N.A.; Five Star Bank; Northwest Savings Bank; Downstate New York and Pennsylvania: Citizens Financial Group; Seattle: Cathay Bank
- Headquarters: Marine Midland Center, Buffalo, New York, U.S.
- Key people: Malcom Burnett, President and CEO
- Products: Financial services
- Total assets: $33 billion as of 1999
- Website: marinemidland.com (archived) us.hsbc.com

Marine Midland Bank was an American bank formerly headquartered in Buffalo, New York, with several hundred branches throughout the state of New York, Pennsylvania and two branches located in Seattle, Washington. The bank was founded in 1850 as Marine Bank and the company was relaunched as Marine Midland Corporation in 1929. The regional banks in New York state and Seattle were unified under the Marine Midland name in 1976. As of 1981, it was the 13th largest bank in the United States.

The bank was acquired by HSBC in 1980 and changed its name to HSBC Bank USA in 1999, while its branches were extended to Pennsylvania in 1998 through the acquisition of First Commercial Bank of Philadelphia. As a result of several transactions since the turn of the millennium, much of what was once Marine Midland is now part of KeyBank with the exception of Downstate New York and Pennsylvania, that is now part of Citizens Bank. Branches in Seattle are part of Cathay Bank.

== History ==
=== Founding ===
Marine Midland was founded as Marine Bank, a state-chartered bank, on July 10, 1850, with capital of $170,000. It was founded by eight men from across New York—General James S. Wadsworth of Geneseo, J. P. Beekman of Kinderhook, New York, John Arnot of Elmira, John Magee and Constant Cook of Bath, William R. Gwinn of Medina, and George Palmer and James M. Ganson of Buffalo. Both Palmer and Wadsworth had railroad connections. The two had financial interests in and served as directors of the Attica and Hornell Railroad, while Palmer had links also with the Buffalo and State Line Railroad. Palmer was elected president and Ganson was named cashier.

The new institution was called Marine Bank because much of its early business depended on the economic vitality of Buffalo's lakefronts and riverfronts. Indeed, it was intended to finance the new shipping trade on the Great Lakes. From the first day it opened its doors on August 27 at 79 Main Street, Marine was the prominent bank for the thriving grain and milling industry on the waterfront. However, the diverse geographic base of the bank's eight founders indicated that they intended to expand across New York.

=== Mergers and acquisitions ===
By the start of the 20th century, Marine Bank began to expand through merger. In 1897 it absorbed the American Exchange Bank, and in 1902 it acquired the Buffalo Commercial Bank. That same year it became a national bank and changed its name to Marine National Bank of Buffalo under president Stephen Merrell Clement.

The next acquisition came in 1913 when Marine absorbed Columbia National Bank. That same year, the bank built a new 17-story office building in Buffalo known as the Marine Midland Trust Company Building.

Six years later, Bankers Trust was acquired. Marine chose to become a state bank again as Marine Trust Company of Buffalo. By the mid-1930s, Marine had acquired eight other banks.

Marine had also taken the lead in the formation of Marine Midland Corporation, a holding company for 17 affiliated banks throughout New York. That first multibank holding company in the state was formed October 4, 1929. 20 days later would be the Wall Street crash of 1929.

As a result of 11 mergers throughout Western New York, Marine Trust Company became Marine Midland Trust Company of Western New York in the 1950s. The name was changed again in the 1960s to Marine Midland Trust Company of Western New York and again in 1970 to Marine Midland Bank-Western. In 1965, the bank purchased Grace National Bank. In 1972, the bank moved its headquarters to a new 38-story tower, Marine Midland Center.

On January 1, 1976, Marine Midland merged all of its affiliated banks under the single charter of Marine Midland Bank, with headquarters in Buffalo. The new bank was divided into regions, with Marine Midland Bank-Western Region based in Buffalo.

Marine Midland Bank became a national bank once again in early 1980. As it entered the 1980s, assets were close to $20 billion.

=== HSBC ===
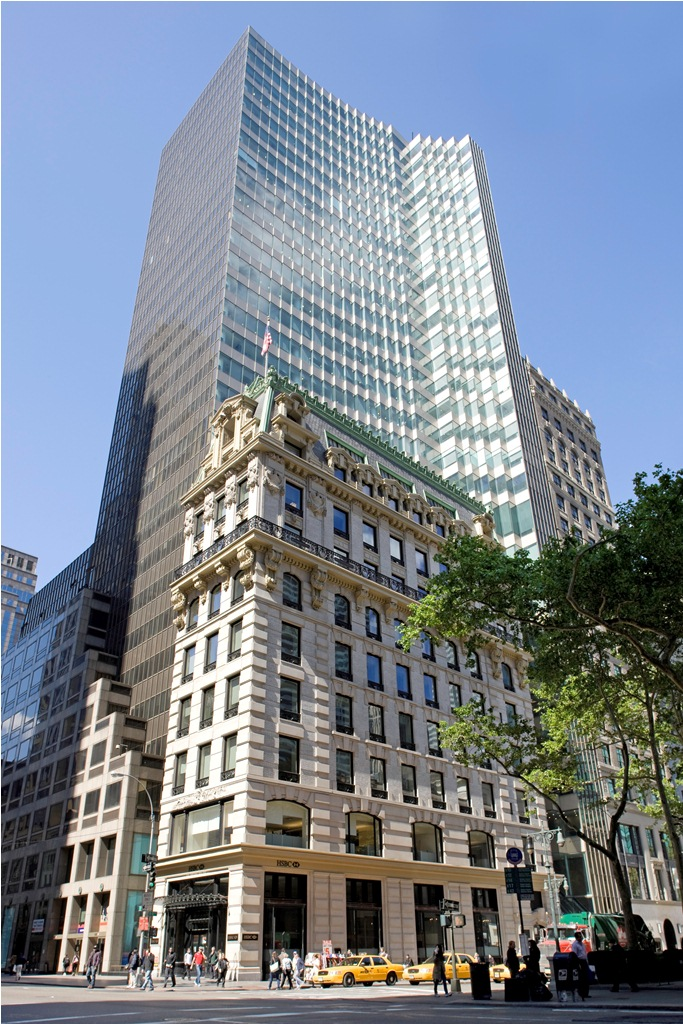
HSBC USA headquarters in New York City on 5th Avenue

In 1980, The Hongkong and Shanghai Banking Corporation acquired a 51 percent controlling interest in Marine Midland Corporation. By then, it was the 13th largest commercial bank in the United States, with about 300 banking offices across New York and about 25 offices in foreign countries. HSBC acquired full ownership in 1987.

In 1983, Marine Midland Bank acquired Carroll McEntee & McGinley (now HSBC Securities (USA)), a New York-based primary dealer in US government securities. In 1994, Marine Midland acquired Spectrum Home Mortgage, which operated in eight states. Then in 1995, Marine acquired United Northern Federal Savings Bank, with branches in Watertown and Lowville, New York. Marine Midland also acquired The Hongkong and Shanghai Banking Corporation's six New York City retail branches, and the next year Hang Seng Bank's two branches in New York City. That same year, Marine Midland acquired 11 branches from the East River Savings Bank in the New York Metropolitan area. Marine also acquired the US dollar clearing business of J P Morgan. At the same time, HSBC transferred two branches in the northwestern United States to Hongkong Bank of Canada. The next year, Marine completed its acquisition of First Federal Savings and Loan from Toronto-based CT Financial Services, for $620 million. First Federal Savings, headquartered in Rochester, had $7.2 billion in assets, 1,600 employees, 79 retail branches in New York State and 15 mortgage origination offices in nine states.

In 1998, Marine Midland acquired First Commercial Bank of Philadelphia, which had been established in 1989 as the first state-chartered Asian-American bank in Pennsylvania. The bank served the local Asian community, which often faced language and cultural barriers at traditional American banks. Marine paid $23.75 million for First Commercial, which had $90 million in assets and $78 million in deposits in two branches.

The bank continued to operate under the Marine Midland name until 1998, when the legal name changed to HSBC Bank USA N.A., and all branches took the HSBC name. In 1999, at the time of its consolidation and change to HSBC Bank USA, the bank had $33 billion (equivalent to $6.5184769×10^{10} in 2025) in assets.

In 2011, HSBC sold its retail banking network in Upstate New York and Connecticut to First Niagara Financial Group, KeyBank, Community Bank, N.A. and Five Star Bank. For all intents and purposes, HSBC had jettisoned the original core of Marine Midland. In 2016 Key merged with First Niagara. In order for the Key/First Niagara merger to gain regulatory approval, Northwest Savings Bank bought 18 First Niagara branches in the Buffalo/Niagara Falls area. As a result, Key owns most of the core of the old Marine Midland, with a small portion held by Northwest. Key had been one of Marine Midland's main rivals in Upstate New York for much of the 20th century. By 2013, HSBC vacated its office space in what was by now known as One HSBC Center; its former headquarters was renamed Seneca One Tower.

In an effort to refocus its operations into the Asian market, HSBC announced in 2021, that it would be exiting the U.S. retail banking business by selling off 80 branches to Citizens Bank on the East Coast (the rest of the original Marine Midland core) and 10 to Cathay Bank on the West Coast, two of which were originally Marine Midland branches.

== Properties ==
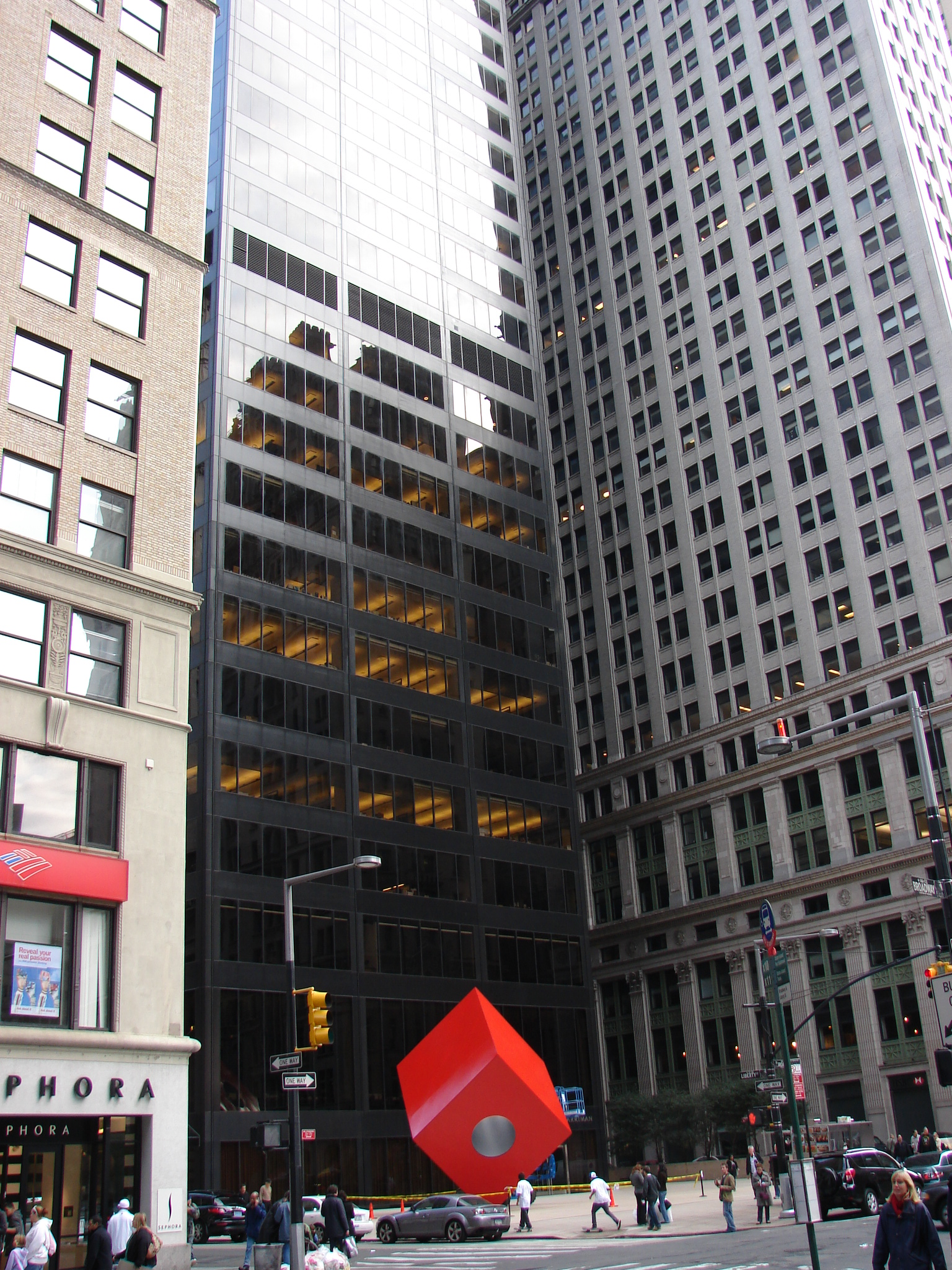
Marine Midland Building, at 140 Broadway in Manhattan

Marine Midland owned, either wholly or in part, several prominent properties in Upstate New York and New York City, including:

- 250 Park Avenue, in Manhattan
- Marine Midland Building, at 140 Broadway in Manhattan (indirect 20% participation in Harry Helmsley's interest), near the World Trade Center. Completed in 1967, this 52-story, 688 ft (209.7 m) highrise provides 1.2 million square feet (110,000 m^{2}) of office space in lower Manhattan and is noted for Isamu Noguchi's distinctive Cube sculpture at its entrance.
- Seneca One Tower, in downtown Buffalo
- The Marin, in downtown Buffalo
- Rand Building, in downtown Buffalo
- Five Star Bank Plaza in Rochester, NY
- 20 Hawley Street in Binghamton, NY, formerly known as One Marine Midland Plaza

== Naming rights ==
Marine Midland purchased the naming rights to the Buffalo sports and entertainment venue constructed in 1996, known as the Marine Midland Arena, home of the Buffalo Sabres, to replace the aging Buffalo Memorial Auditorium. The arena is now known as KeyBank Center.

== See also ==
- HSBC Bank USA
