= Joseph Ellicott Historic District =

Historic district in Buffalo, New York

Coordinates: 42°53′3″N 78°52′41″W

Joseph Ellicott's 1805 street plan for the village of Buffalo

Joseph Ellicott Historic District is a local historic district in Buffalo, New York. It is near Niagara Square, which was designed by Joseph Ellicott as the centerpiece of the city's street plan in 1805.

== History ==
The district was founded on November 30, 1982, by the Buffalo Preservation Board. It is bordered to the North by West Mohawk Street, to the East by Franklin Street, to the South by Swan Street, and to the West by Elmwood Avenue.

Sahlen Field encroached on the southern border of the district when it was built in 1988, although the Buffalo Preservation Board approved the venue's construction after the architecture was designed to match the neighboring Ellicott Square Building and Old Post Office.

=== Notable extant buildings ===
Notable buildings include:

- 68 Court Street – Michael J. Dillon Memorial United States Courthouse (1936) by Edward Brodhead Green
- 107 Delaware Avenue – Statler Hotel (1923) by George B. Post and Sons
- 121 Ellicott Street – Old Post Office (1897) by James Knox Taylor
- 50 Franklin Street – St. Joseph Cathedral (1863) by Patrick Keely
- 100 Franklin Street – County and City Hall (1872) by Andrew Jackson Warner
- 237 Main Street – Marine Midland Trust Company Building (1913) by Green & Wicks
- 283 Main Street – Ellicott Square Building (1896) by Daniel Burnham
- 284 Main Street – Fidelity Trust Building (1909) by Green & Wicks
- 65 Niagara Square – Buffalo City Hall (1930) by Dietel, Wade & Jones
- 140 Pearl Street – Prudential Building (1896) by Louis H. Sullivan and Dankmar Adler

== Gallery ==
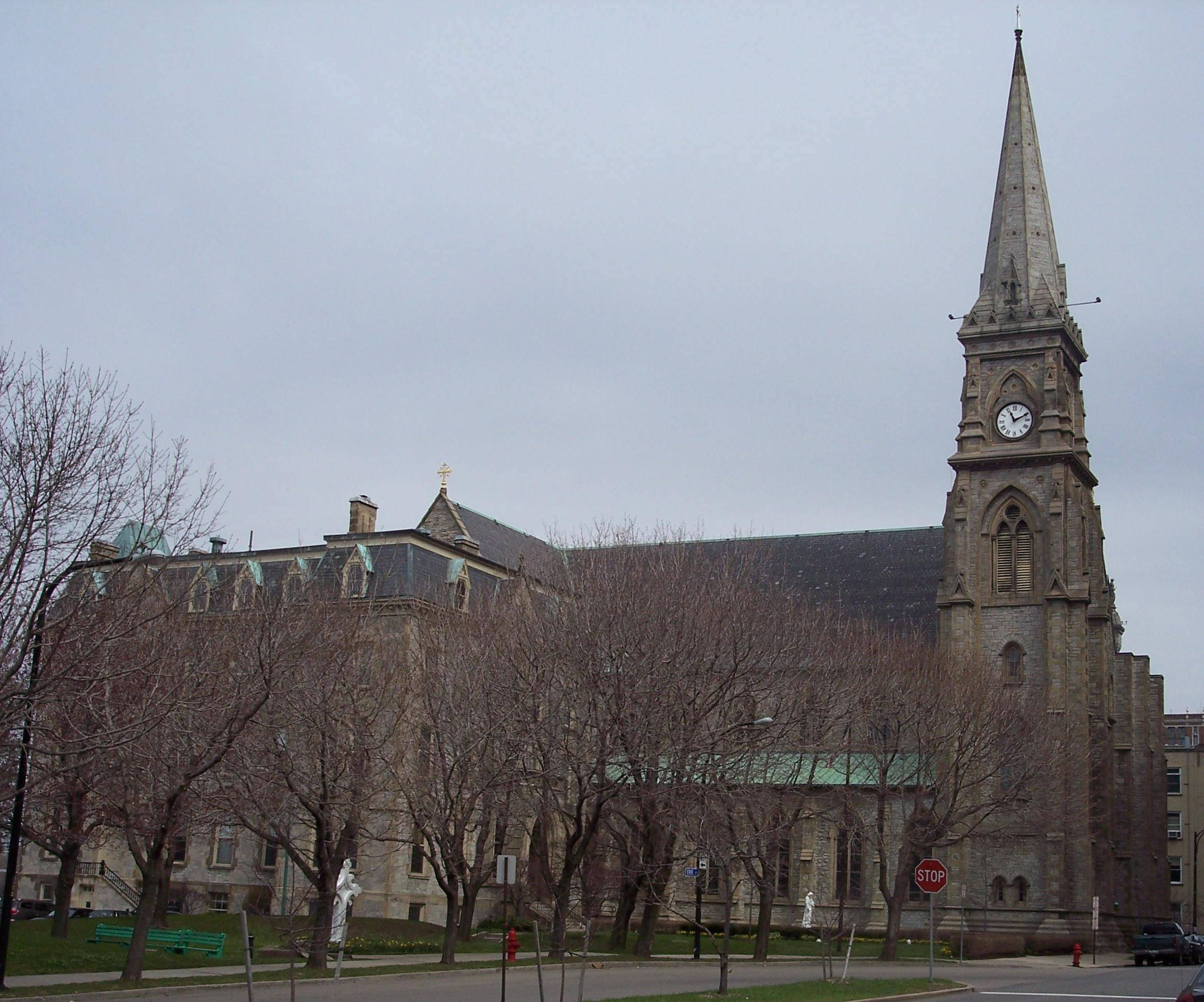
St. Joseph Cathedral (1863) by Patrick Keely

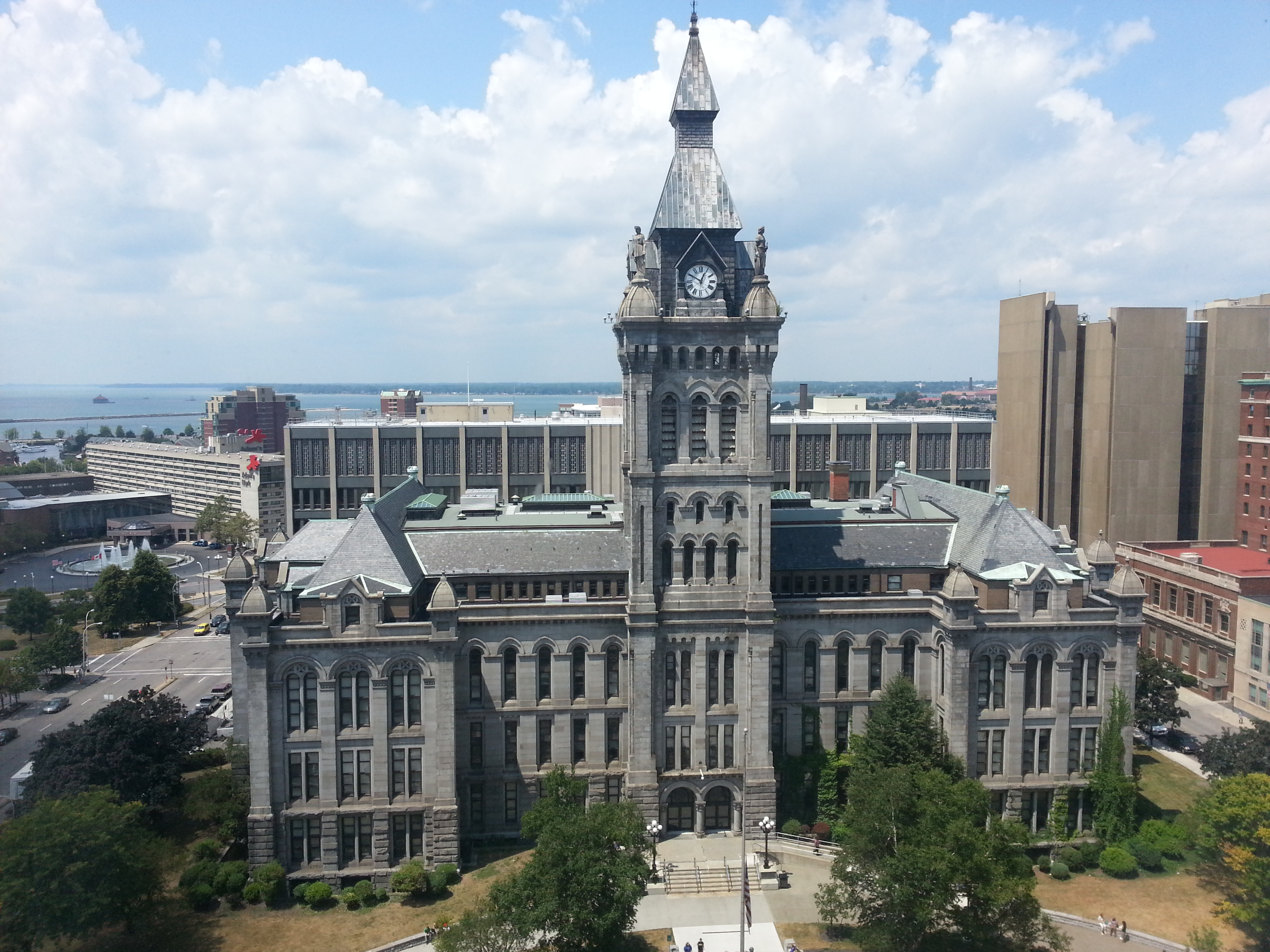
County and City Hall (1872) by Andrew Jackson Warner

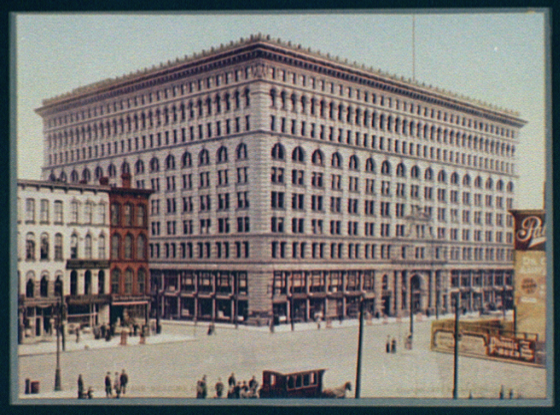
Ellicott Square Building (1896) by Daniel Burnham

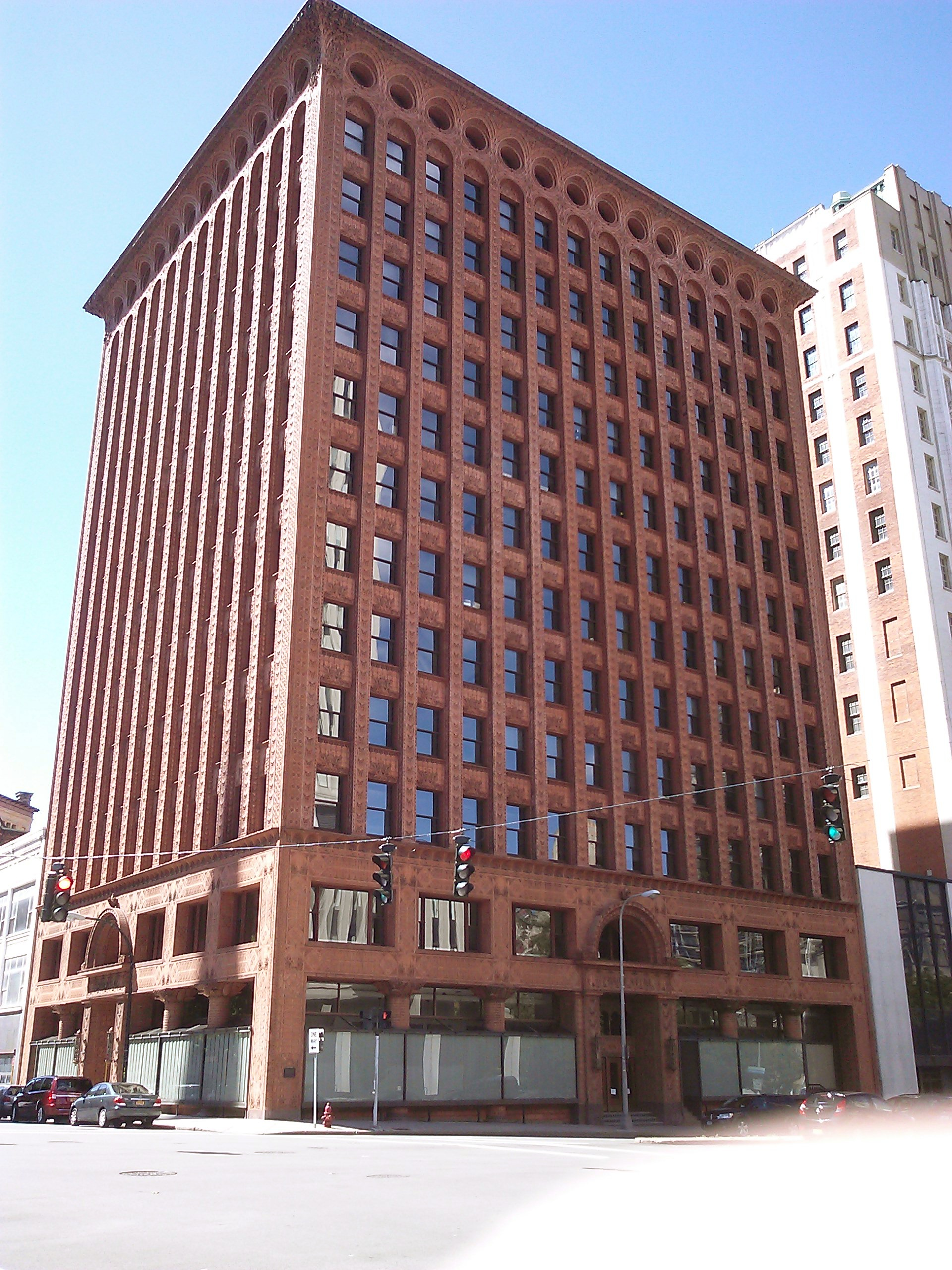
Prudential Building (1896) by Louis H. Sullivan and Dankmar Adler

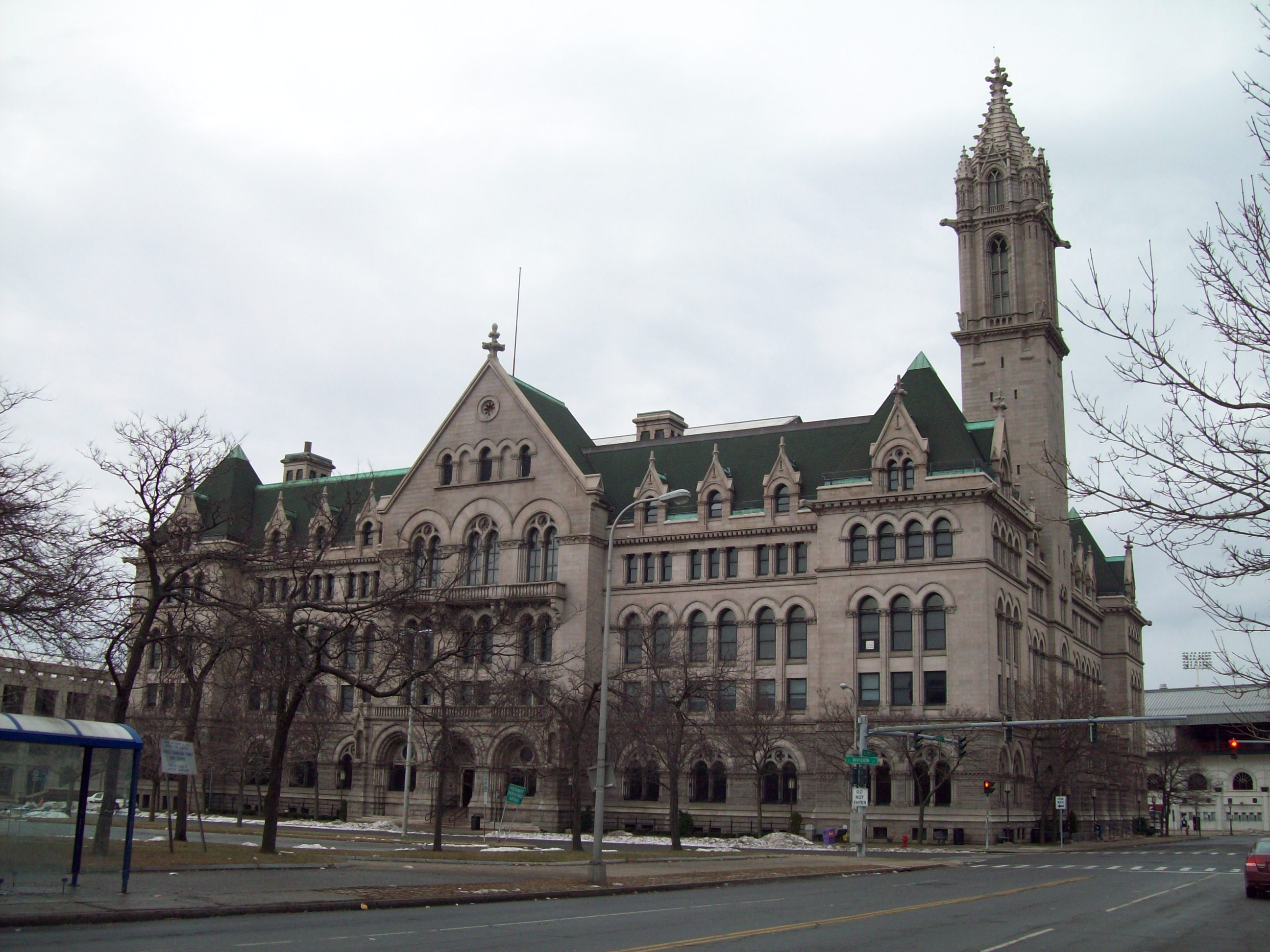
Old Post Office (1897) by James Knox Taylor

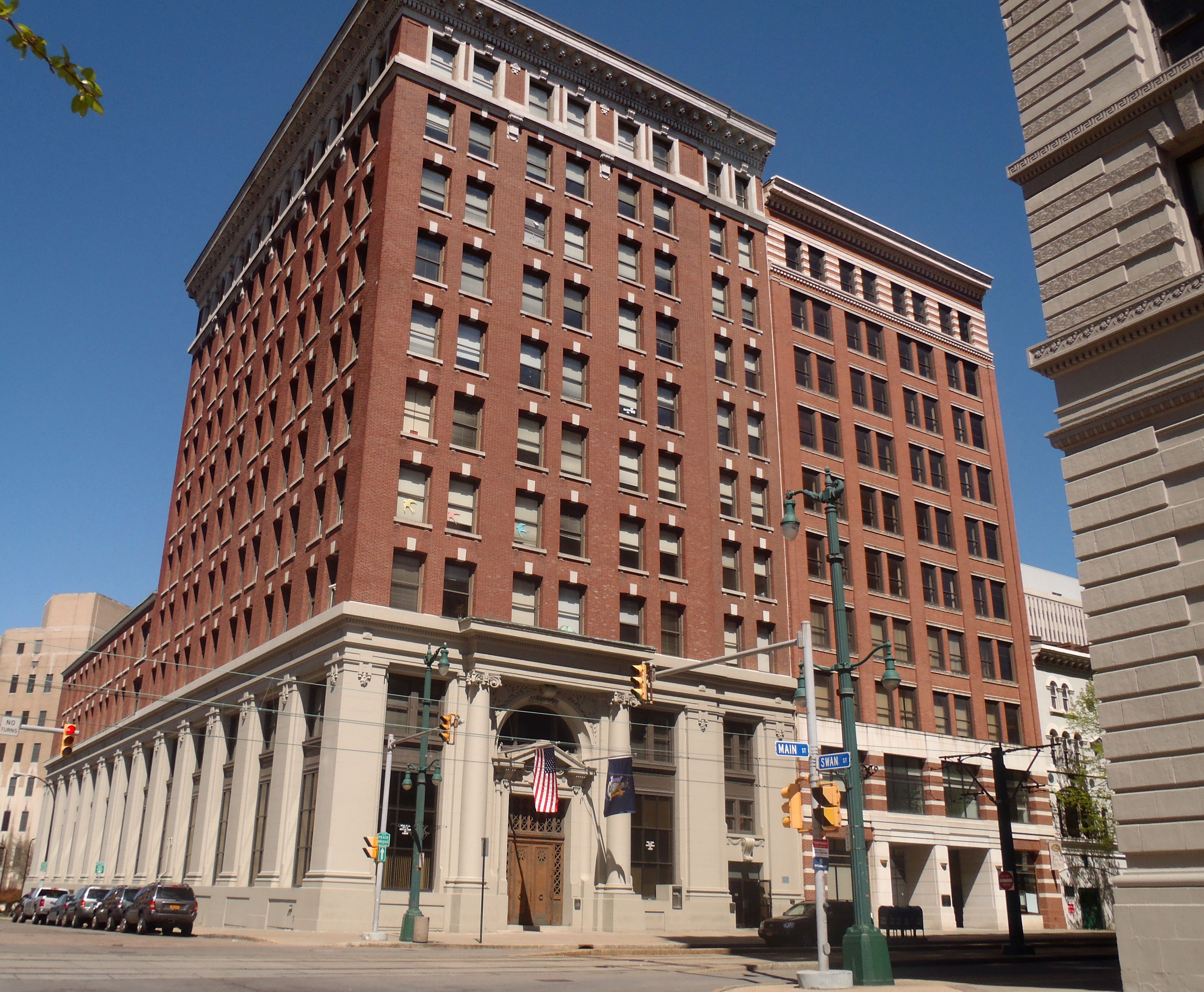
Fidelity Trust Building (1909) by Green & Wicks

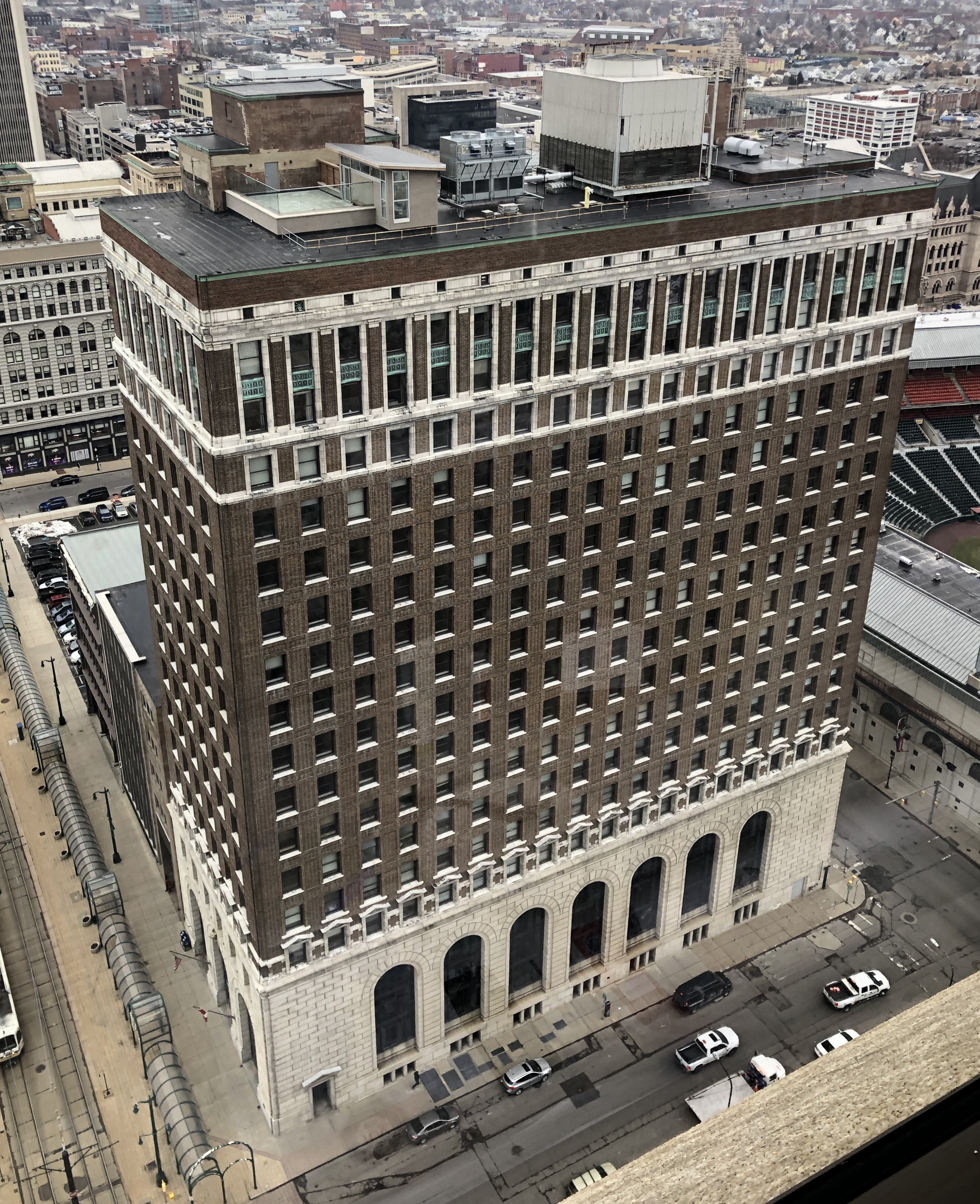
Marine Midland Trust Company Building (1913) by Green & Wicks

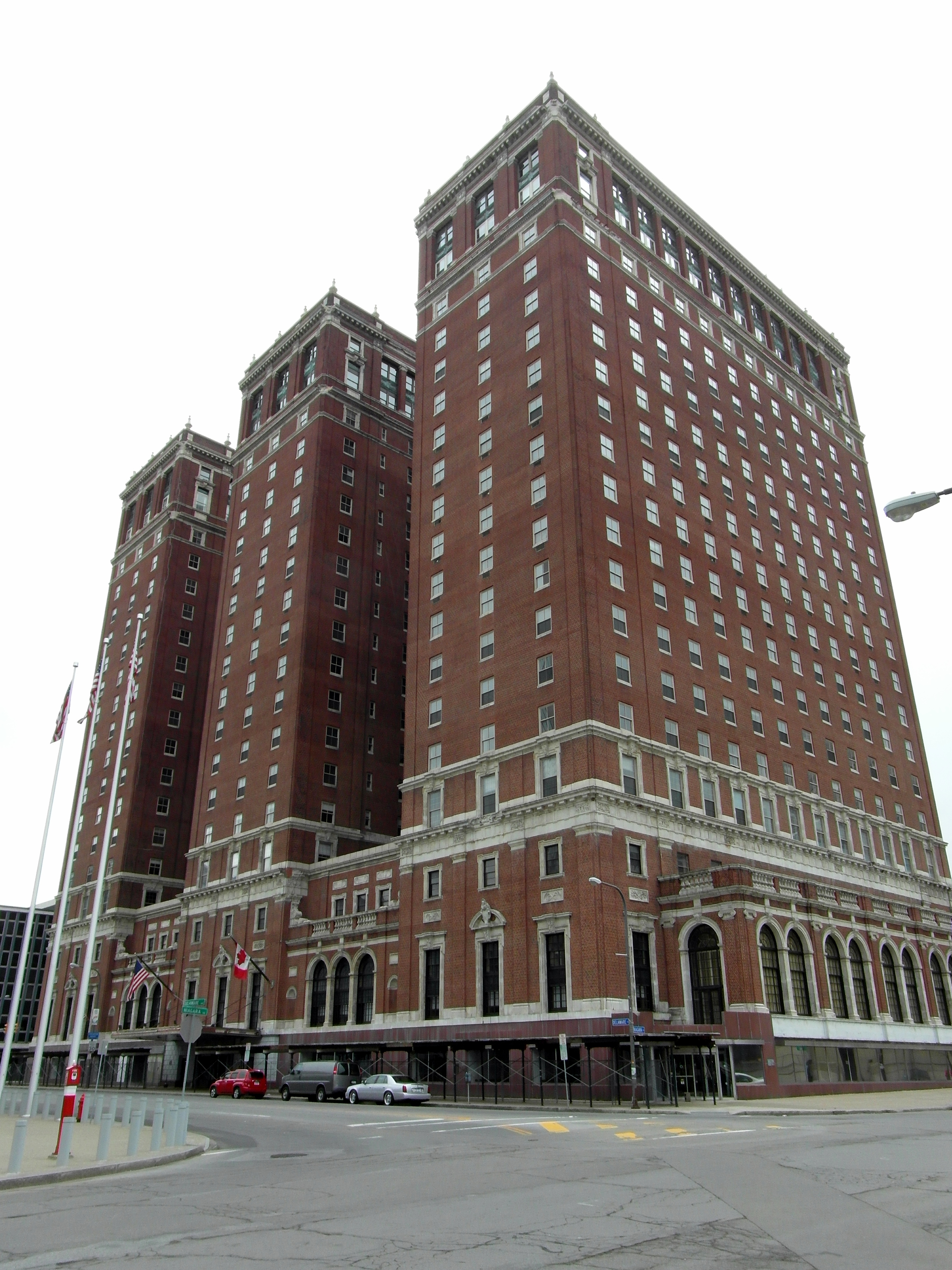
Statler Hotel (1923) by George B. Post and Sons

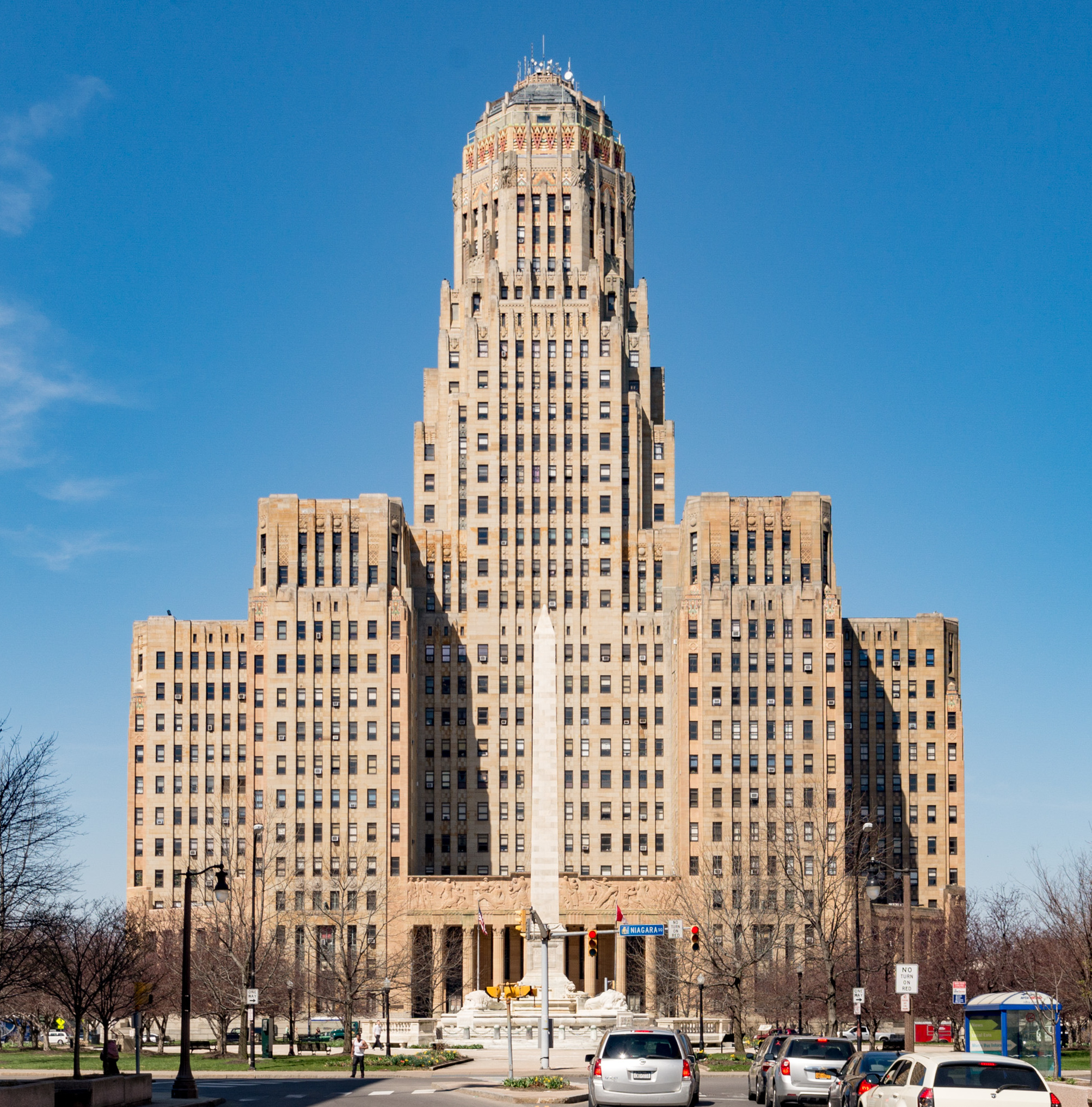
Buffalo City Hall (1930) by Dietel, Wade & Jones

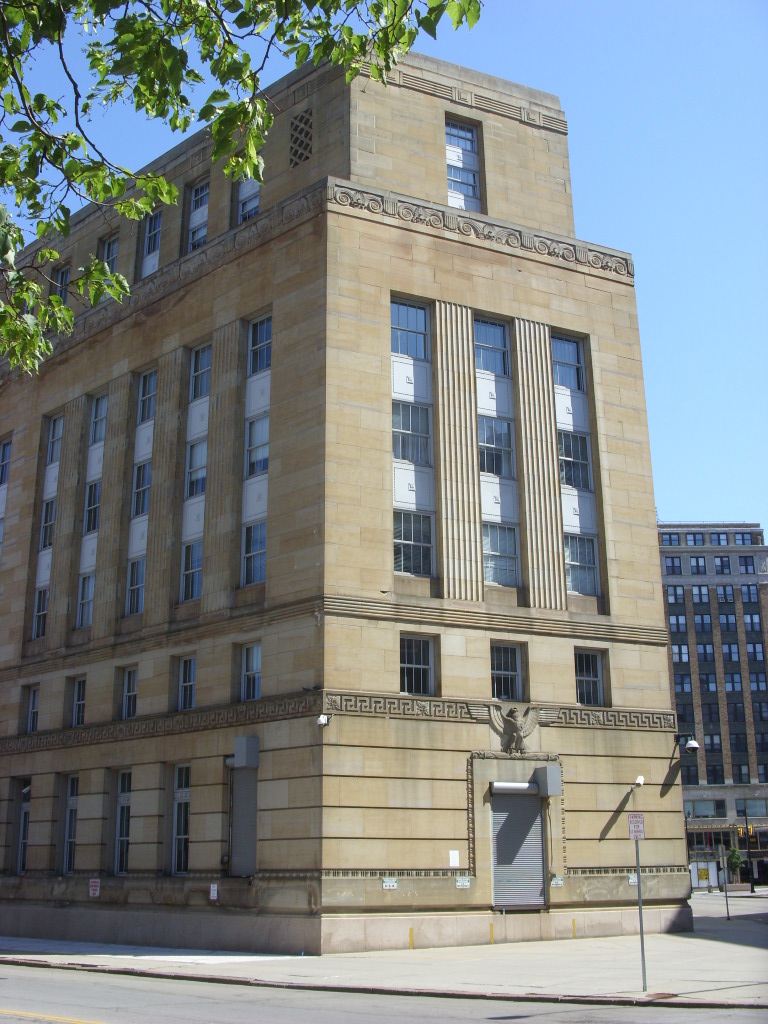
Michael J. Dillon Memorial United States Courthouse (1936) by Edward Brodhead Green
