= Green and Wicks =

Architecture firm based in Buffalo (USA)

Green & Wicks
- Company type: Private company
- Industry: Architecture
- Founded: 1884
- Founder: Edward Brodhead Green; William Sydney Wicks
- Defunct: 1974
- Headquarters: Buffalo, New York

Green & Wicks was an architectural firm of Buffalo, New York.

== Practice ==
Edward Brodhead Green was an 1878 graduate of Cornell University's College of Architecture, and designed a number of buildings which made up Cornell's Agriculture Quadrangle, including Bailey Hall (1912), Caldwell Hall (1913), the Computing and Communications Center (1912, originally known as Comstock Hall), Fernow Hall (1915), and the original Roberts Hall (1906, demolished 1990).

Green's best-known commissions were designed with his partner William Sydney Wicks (1854–1917), as Green & Wicks. The firm's chronology is:

- 1884: Green & Wicks founded
- 1917: Renamed E.B. Green & Son
- 1933: Renamed E. B Green after his son's death
- 1936: Renamed Green & James
- 1945: Renamed Green, James & Meadows
- 1950: Renamed James & Meadows after Green's death
- 1952: Renamed James, Meadows & Howard
- 1974: Firm dissolved

The firm's records survive in the library collections of the Buffalo History Museum.

A number of their works are listed on the U.S. National Register of Historic Places.

== Projects ==
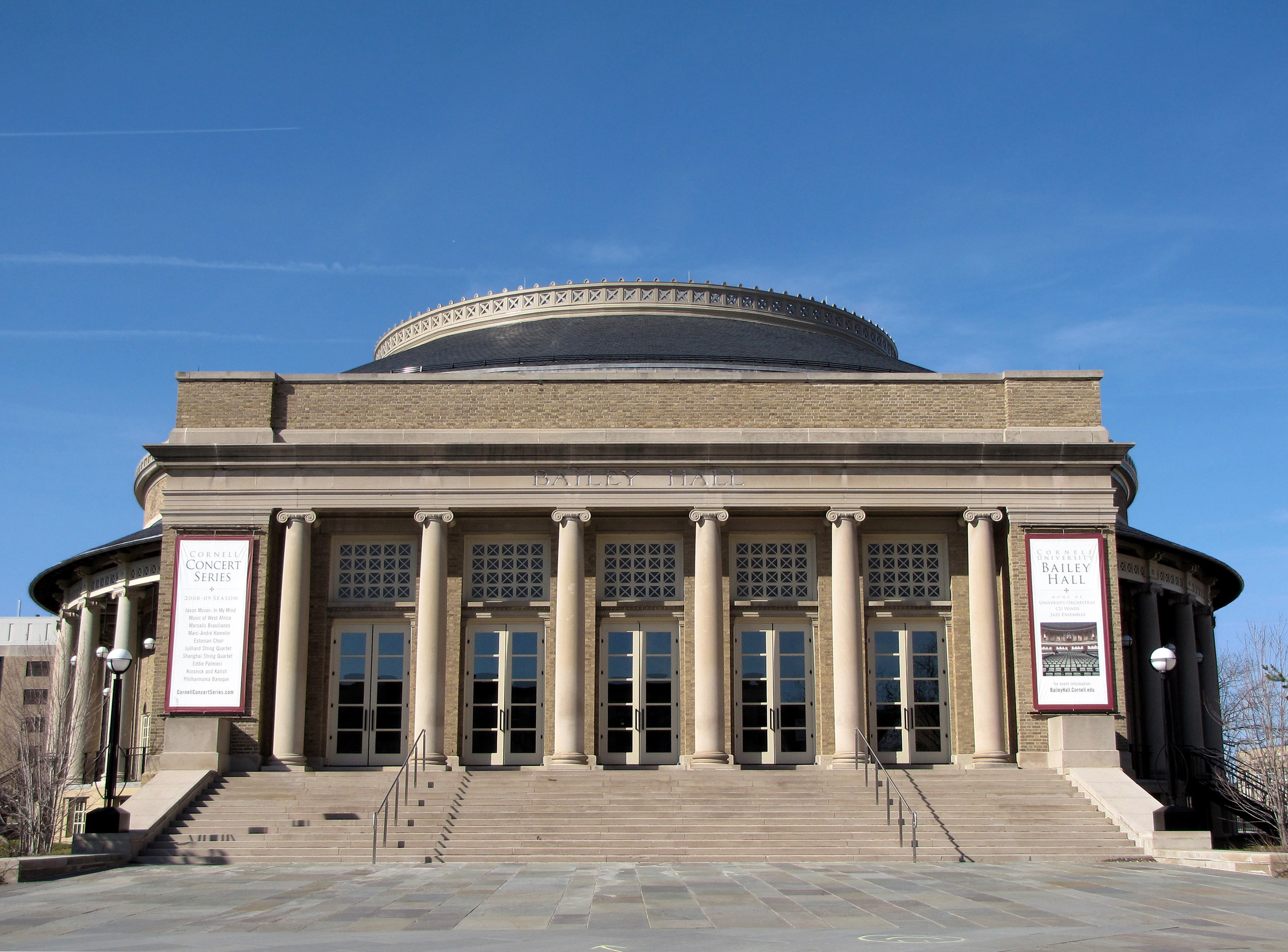
Bailey Hall, Cornell University (1912)

Notable works of the Green & Wicks architectural firm include:

- Albright-Knox Art Gallery
- Albright Memorial Building, N. Washington Ave. and Vine St. Scranton, PA (Green & Wicks), NRHP-listed
- American Radiator Company Factory Complex, Buffalo, NY, NRHP-listed
- Bailey Hall, Cornell University, 1912, NRHP-listed
- Buffalo Crematorium Company, 901 W Delavan Ave, Buffalo, NY
- Birge-Horton House, 477 Delaware Ave. Buffalo, NY (Green and Wicks), NRHP-listed
- Brick Presbyterian Church, 6 Church St. Perry, NY (Green & Wicks), NRHP-listed
- Brost Building (c. 1935) in the Broadway Historic District, Lancaster, New York
- Buffalo Athletic Club
- Buffalo Savings Bank Building
- Caldwell Hall, Cornell University campus Ithaca, NY (Green & Wicks), NRHP-listed
- Charles W. Goodyear House, Buffalo, NY
- Dayton Art Institute, Dayton, Ohio
- Dun Building, 110 Pearl Street, Buffalo, NY
- D.S. Morgan building, (destroyed), Buffalo, NY
- Erie County Holding Center
- Fernow Hall, Cornell University campus Ithaca, NY (Green & Wicks), NRHP-listed
- Fidelity Trust Building, now known as "Swan Tower", 284 Main Street, Buffalo, NY
- Kibler High School, 284 Main St., Tonawanda, New York
- Marine National Bank, 1913
- Market Arcade Building, 617 Main St, Buffalo, NY
- Old West End District, Roughly bounded by Delaware, Collingwood, and Glenwood Aves. and Grove Pl. Toledo, OH (Green & Wicks), NRHP-listed
- Ransom School "Pagoda", 3575 Main Hwy. Miami, FL (Greene & Wicks), NRHP-listed
- South Park High School
- Stephen Merrell Clement House, 1913, 786 Delaware Ave, Buffalo, NY, Extant as the Red Cross Building
- St. Vincent's Female Orphan Asylum, 1313 Main St. Buffalo, NY
- University Club Building (Buffalo)
- Twentieth Century Club (Buffalo, New York)
- Watson-Curtze Mansion, 356 W. 6th St. Erie, PA (Green & Wicks), NRHP-listed
- Wing Hall, Cornell University campus Ithaca, NY (Green & Wicks), NRHP-listed
- Young Men's Christian Association Central Building, 45 W. Mohawk St. Buffalo, NY (Green & Wicks), NRHP-listed

Notable works of the E.B. Green and Sons architectural firm include:

- Abbot Hall / Lockwood Memorial Library, University at Buffalo (South Campus), 1933
- Crosby Hall, University at Buffalo (South Campus), 1931
- Electric Tower, 535 Washington St. Buffalo, NY, NRHP-listed
- Michael J. Dillon Memorial United States Courthouse, 68 Court Street, Buffalo NY
- Garret Club, 91 Cleveland Ave., Buffalo, NY, 1929

Notable works of the Green & James architectural firm include:

- Buffalo Memorial Auditorium, (destroyed), Buffalo NY
- Parker Hall, University at Buffalo (South Campus), 1945

== Gallery ==
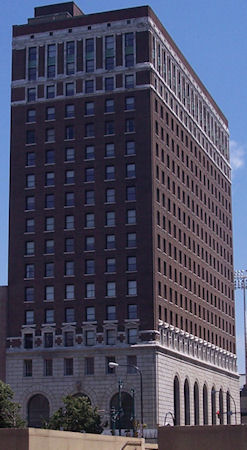
The Marin

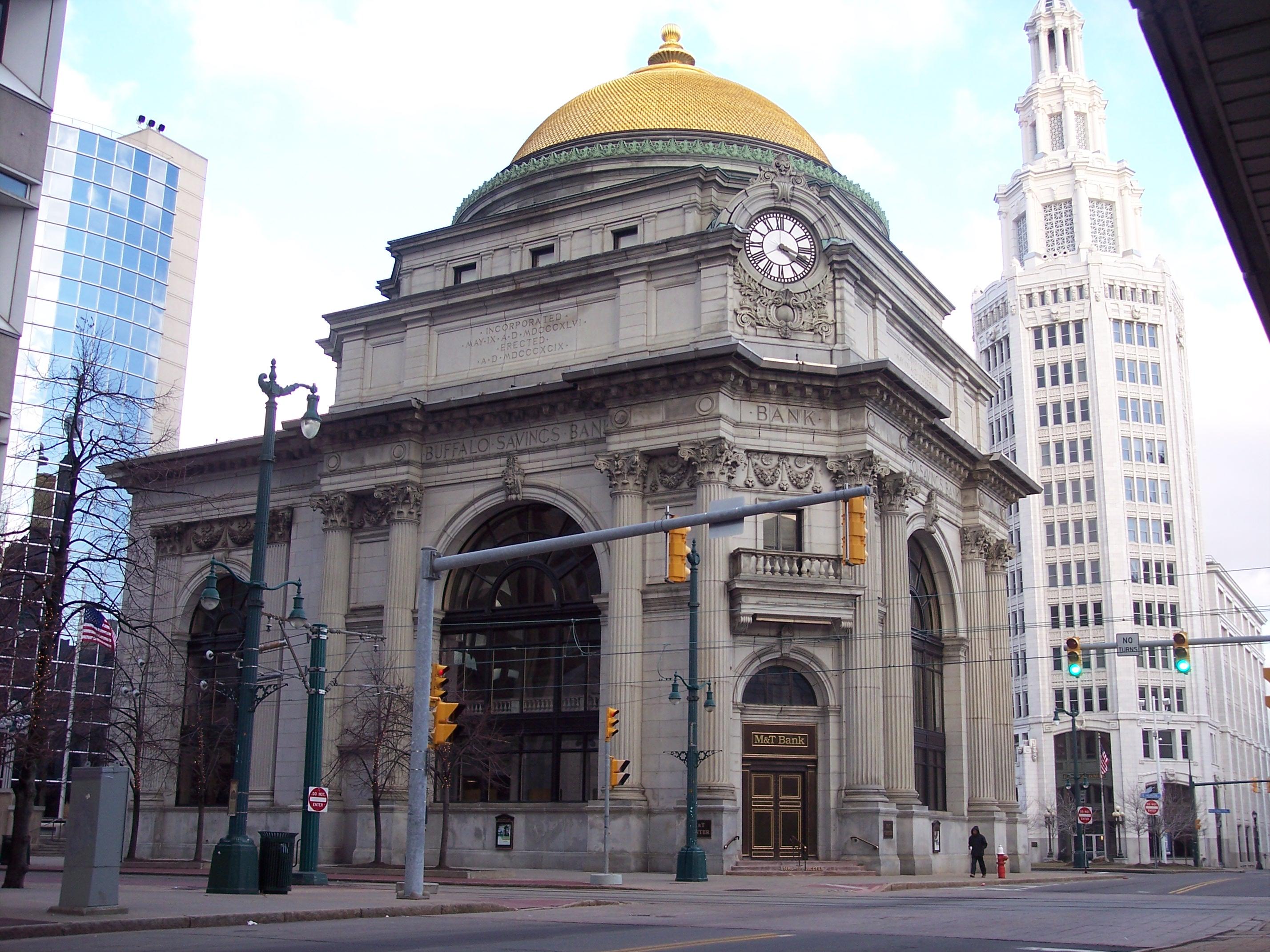
Buffalo Savings Bank

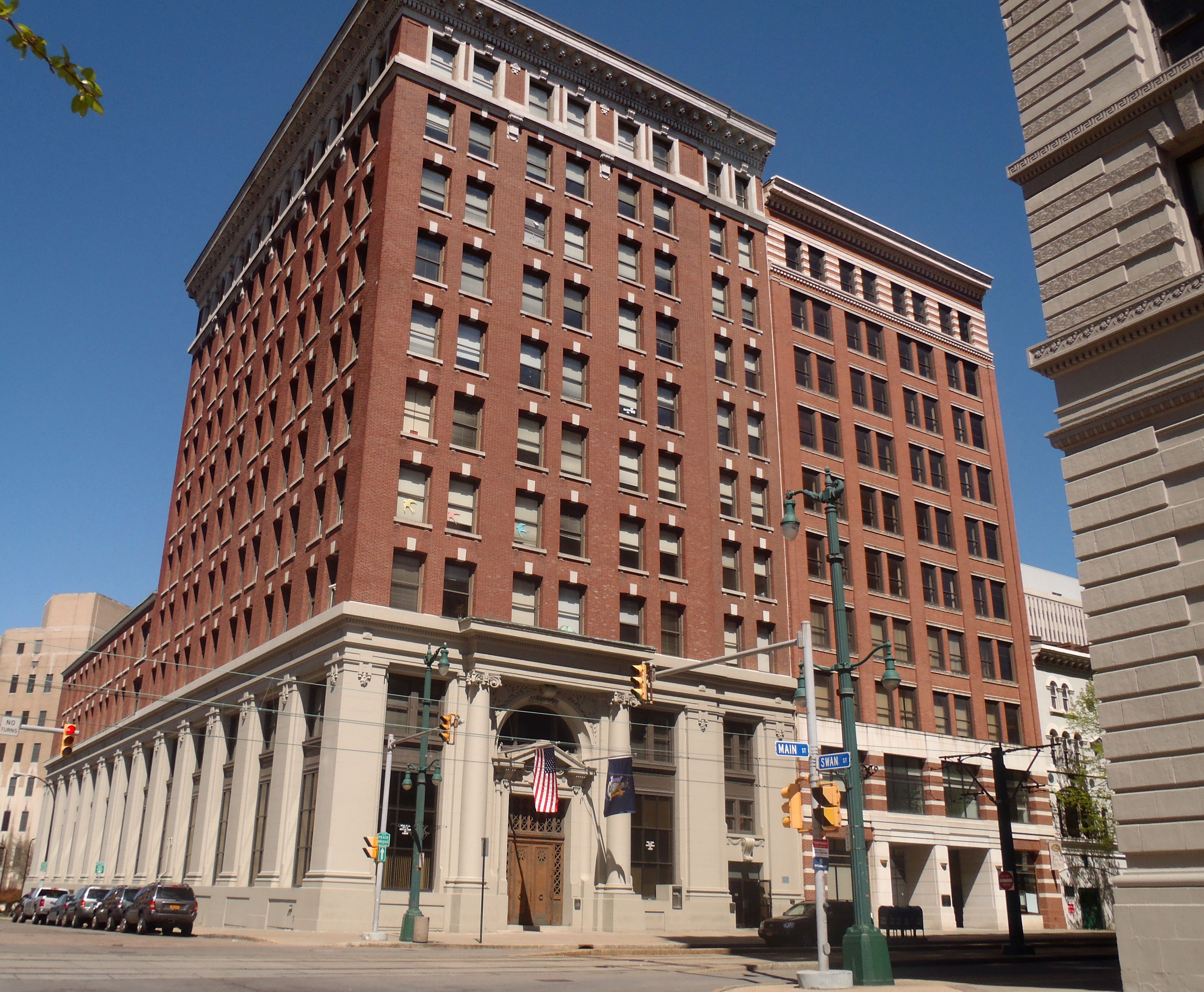
Swan Tower

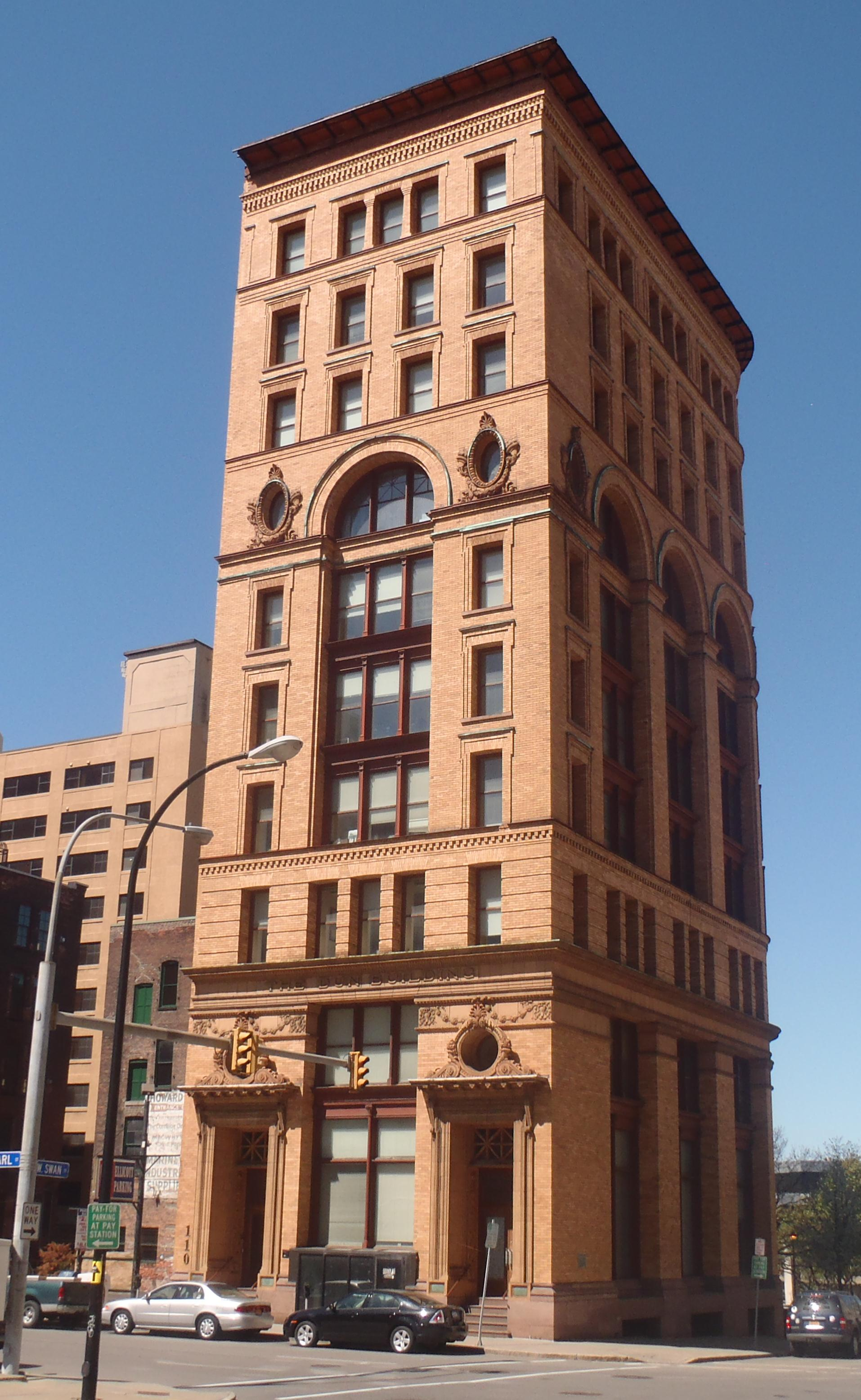
Dun building

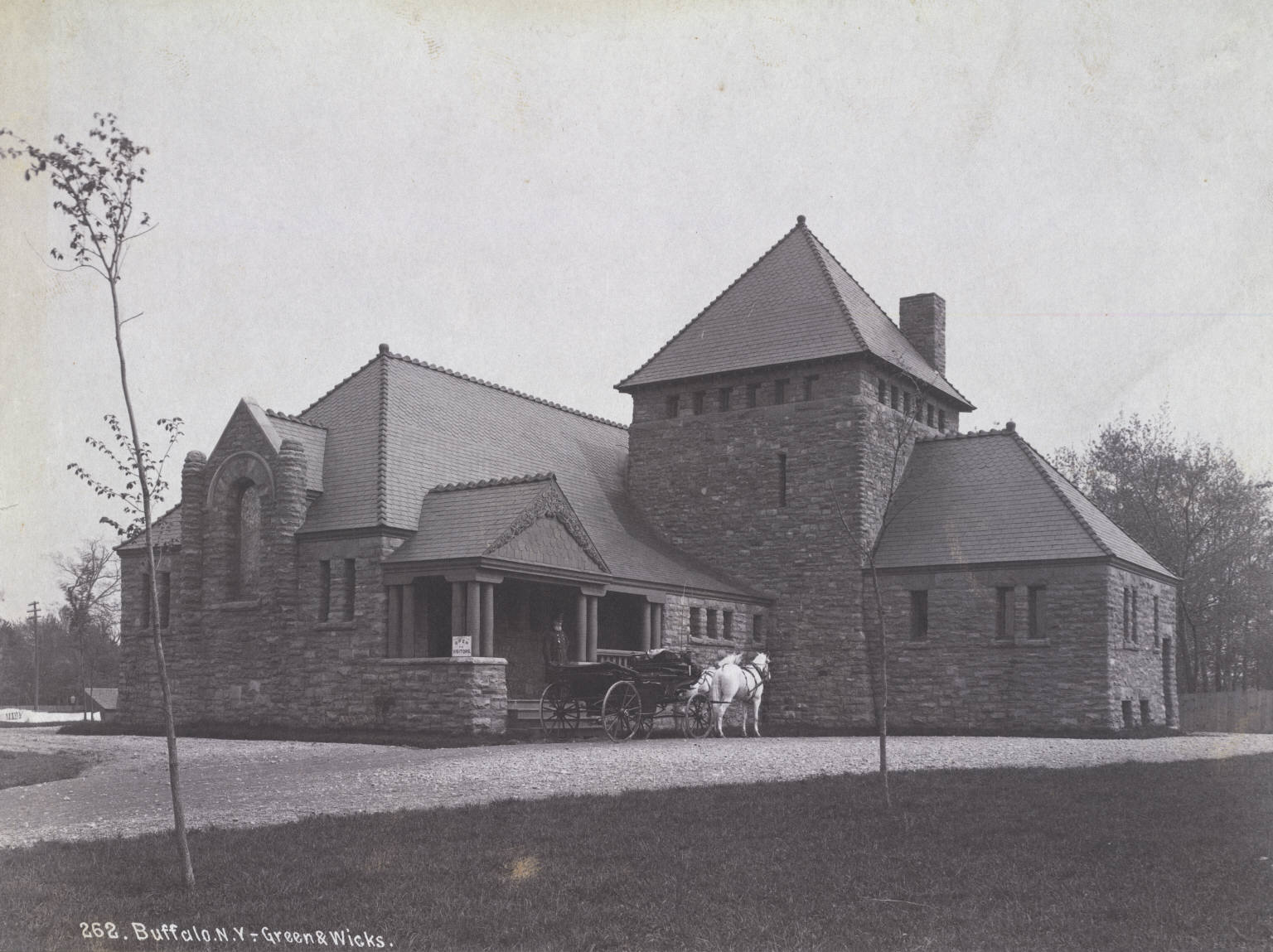
Buffalo Crematorium

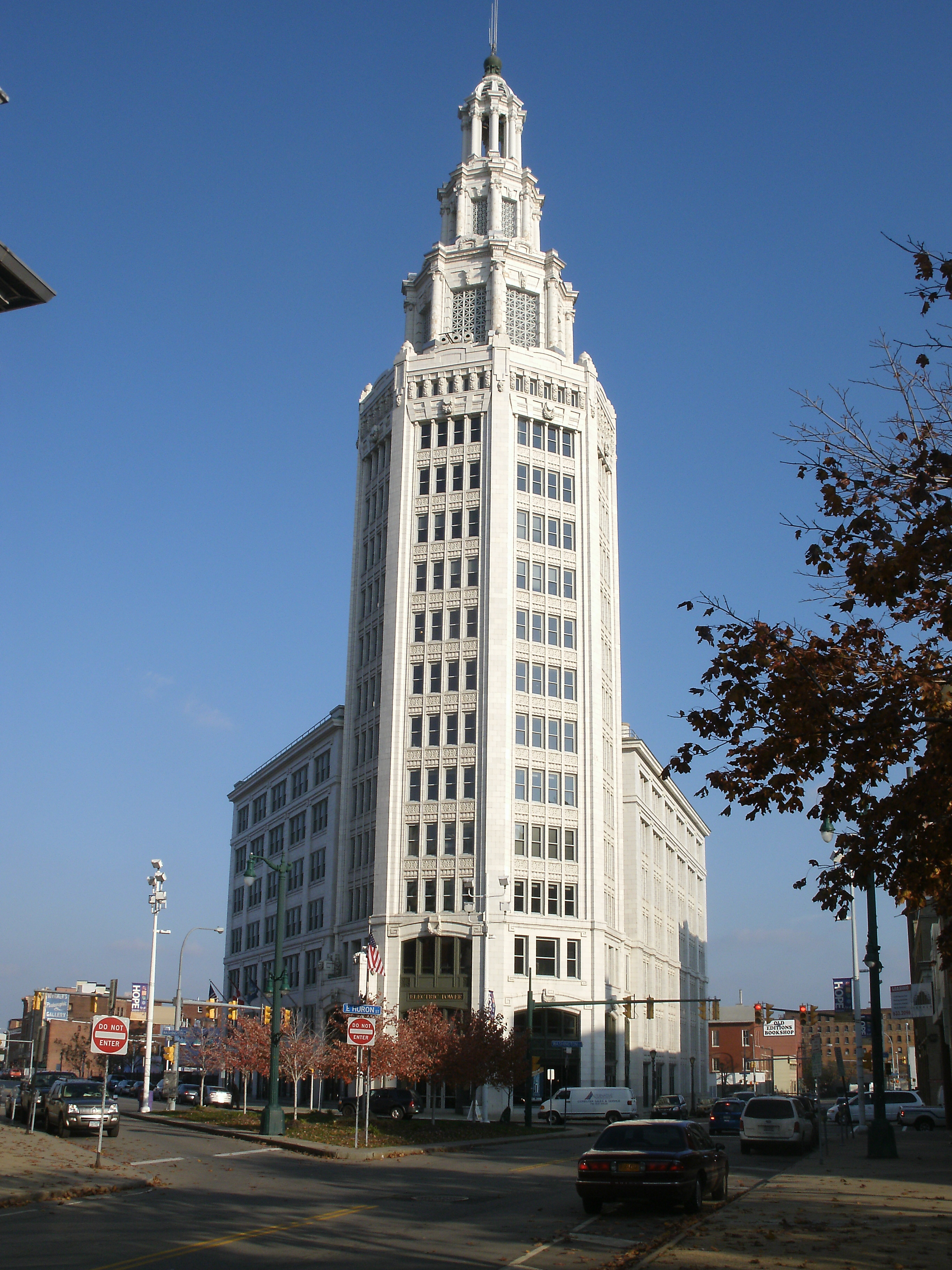
Electric Tower

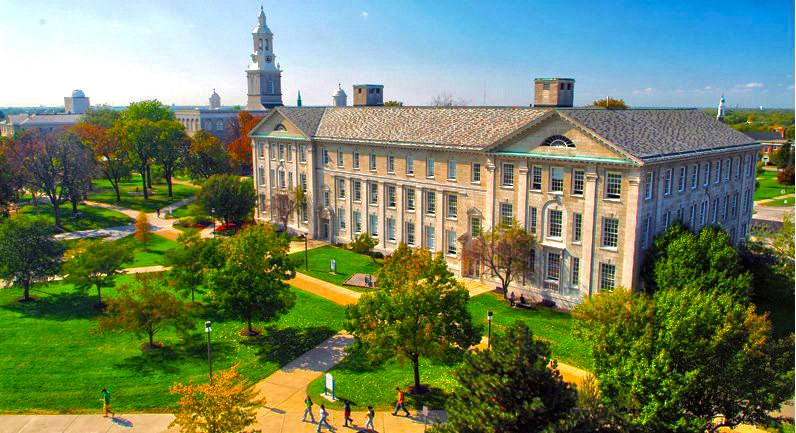
Crosby Hall

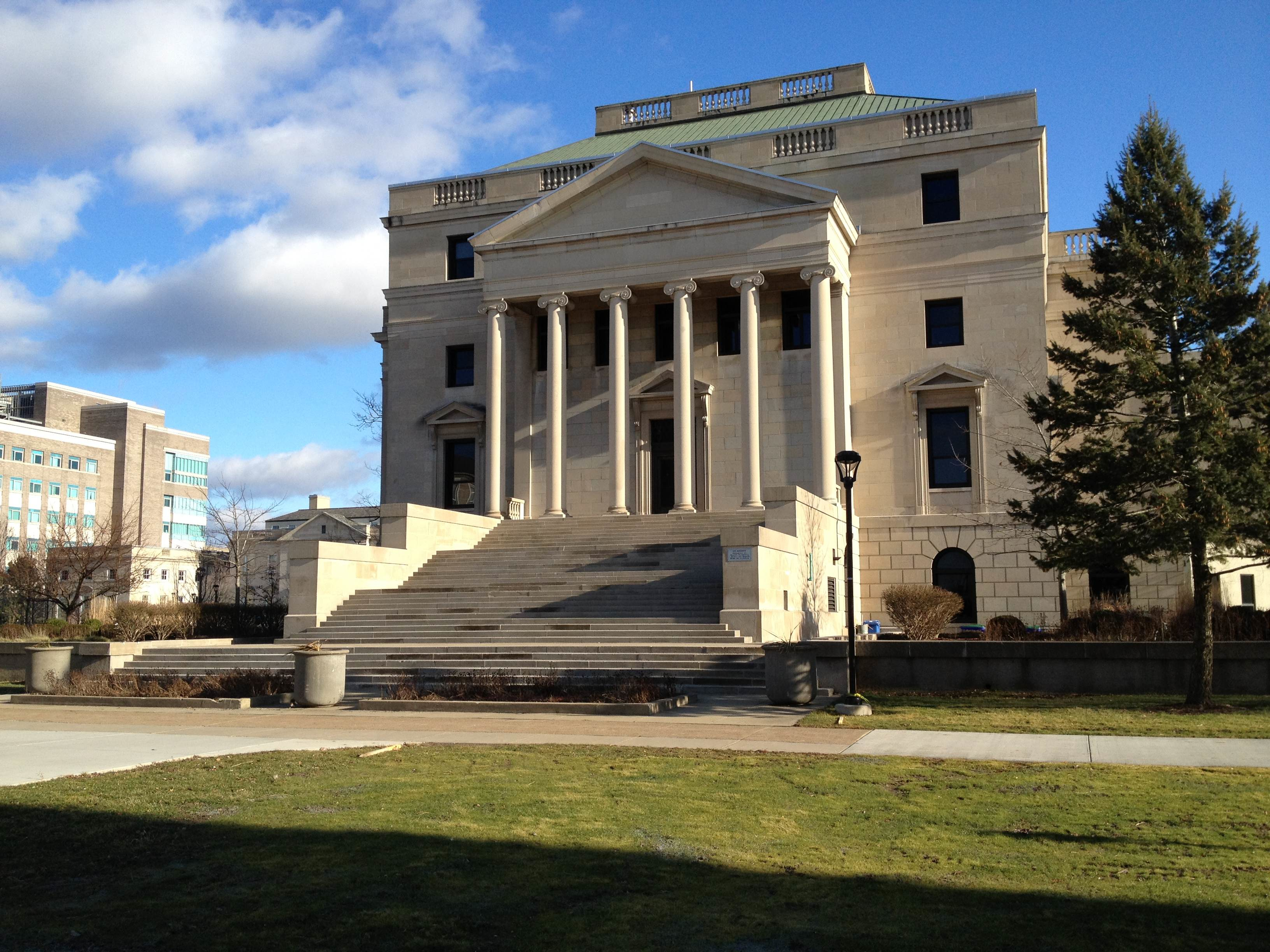
Abbot Hall

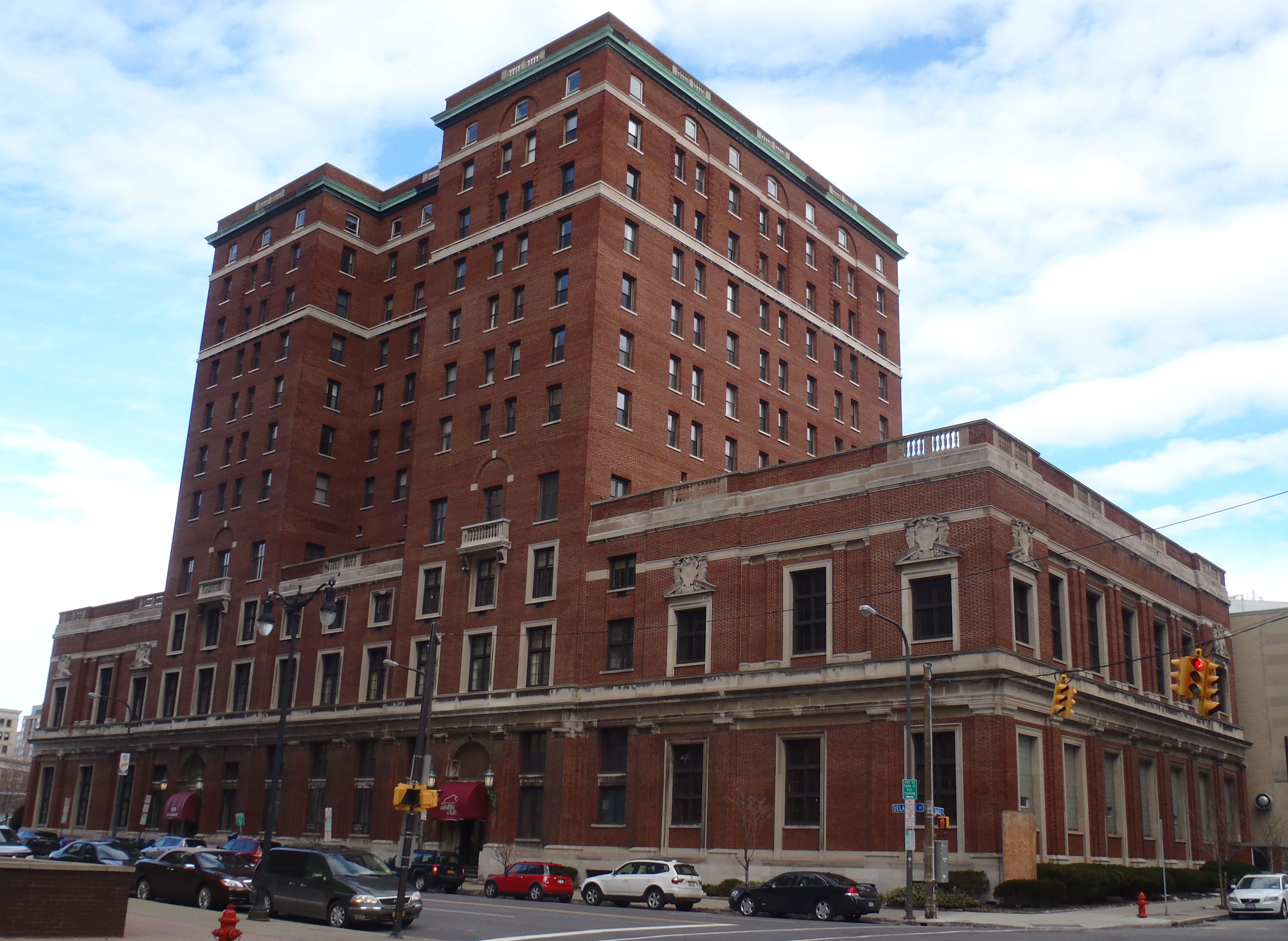
Buffalo Athletic Club

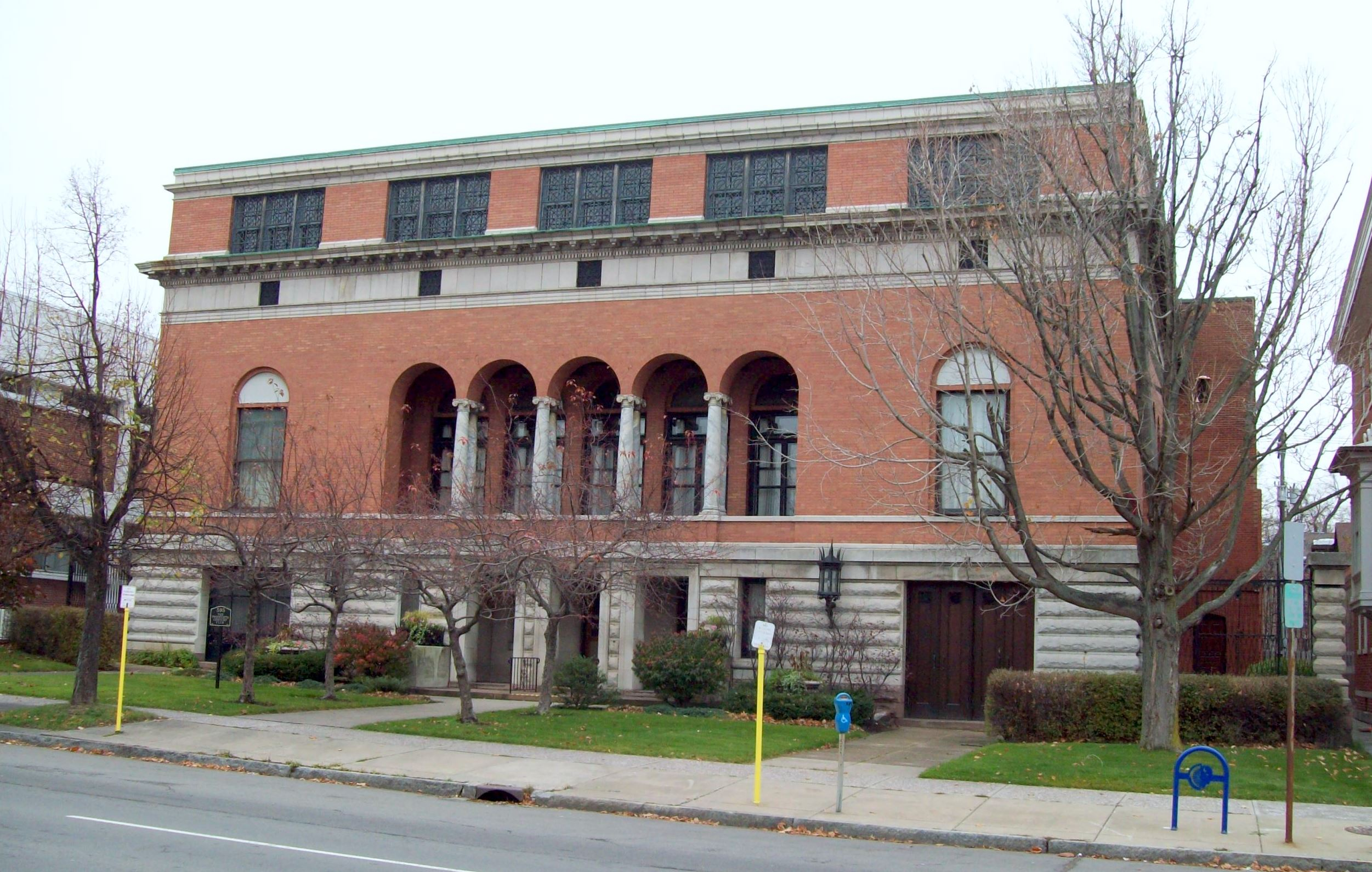
Twentieth Century Club

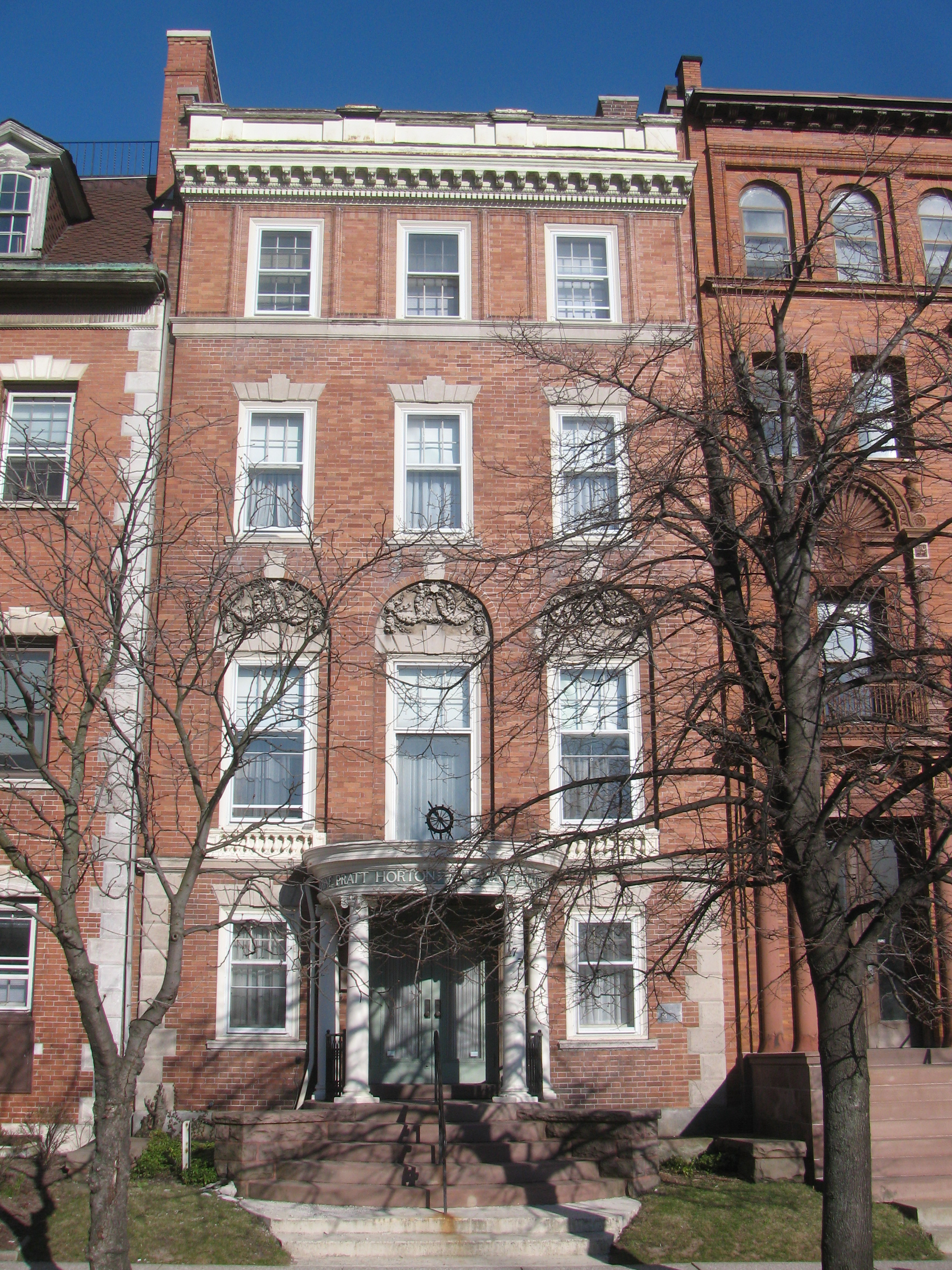
Birge-Horton House

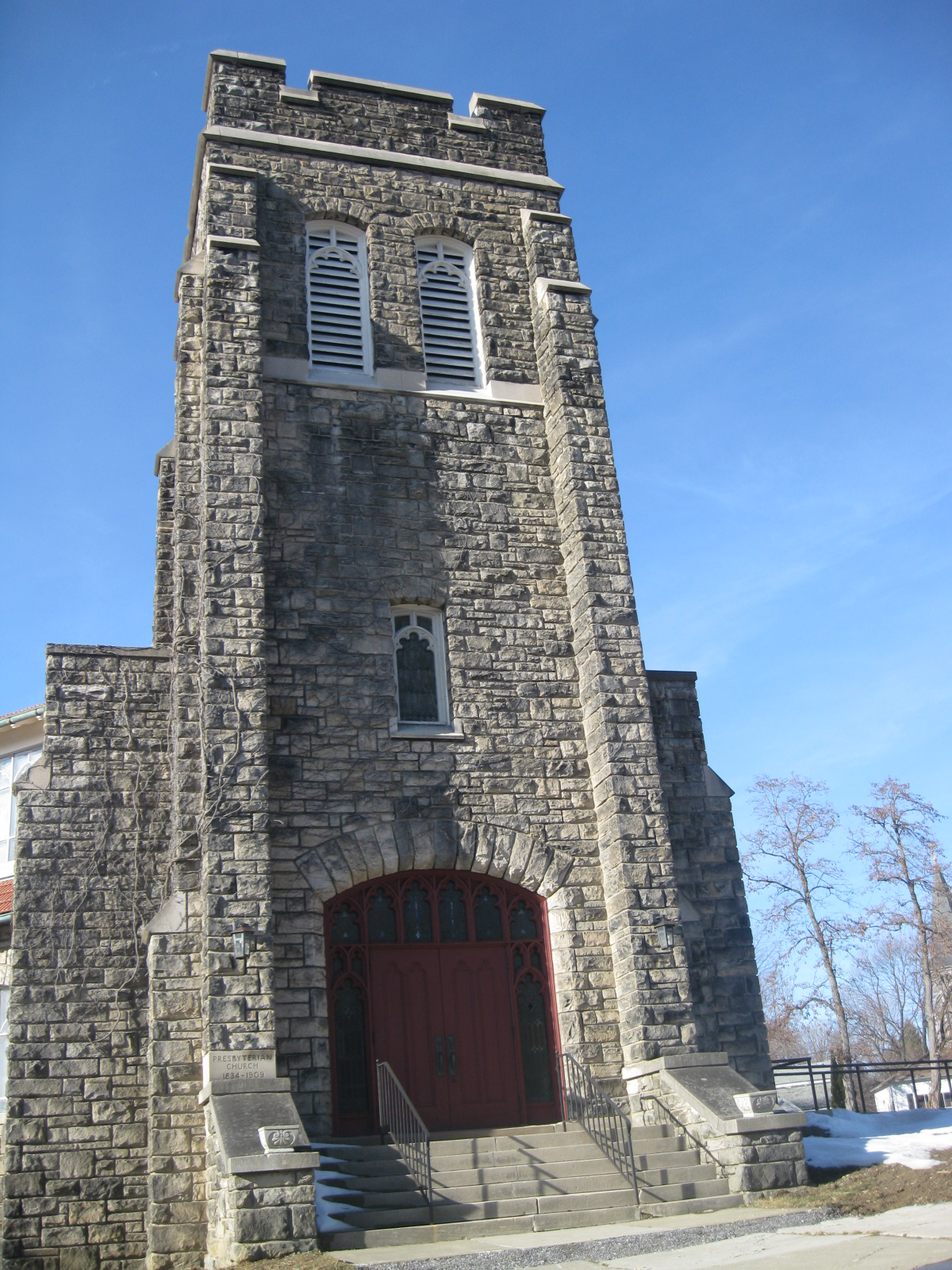
Brick Presbyterian Church

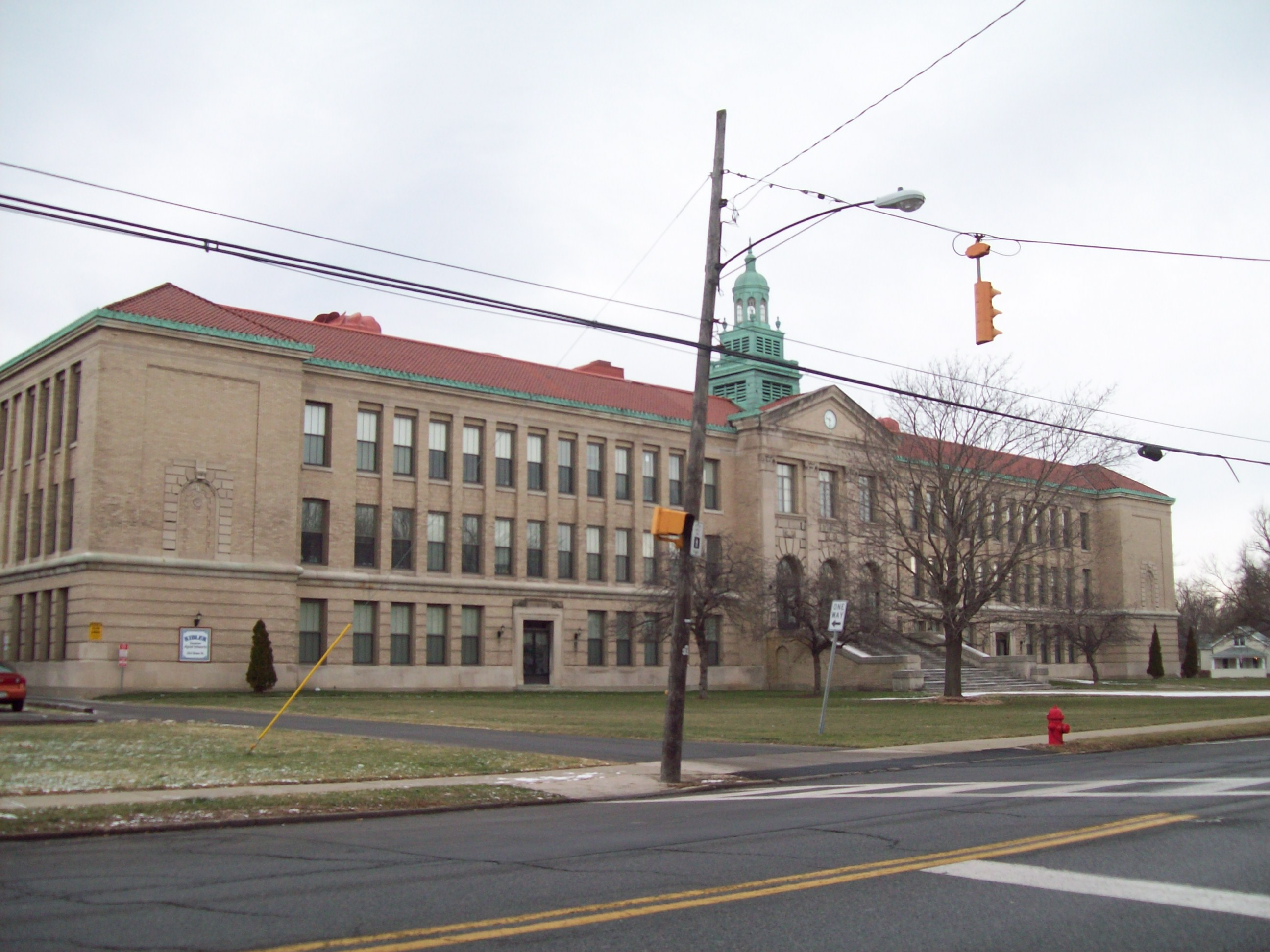
Kibler High School

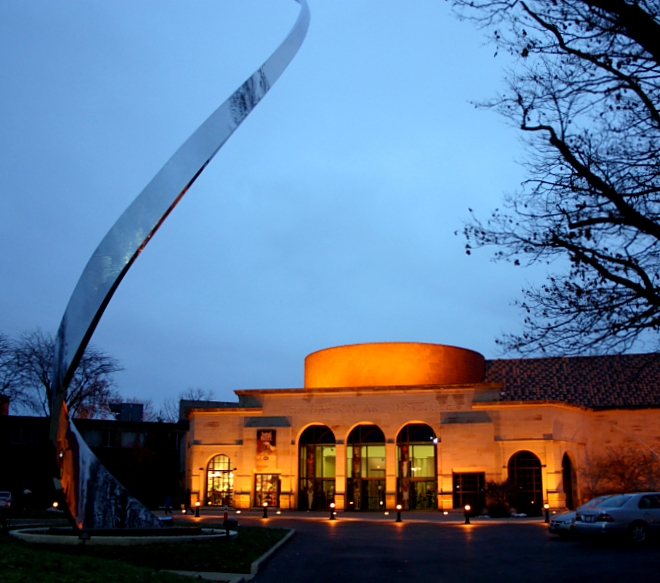
Dayton Art Institute

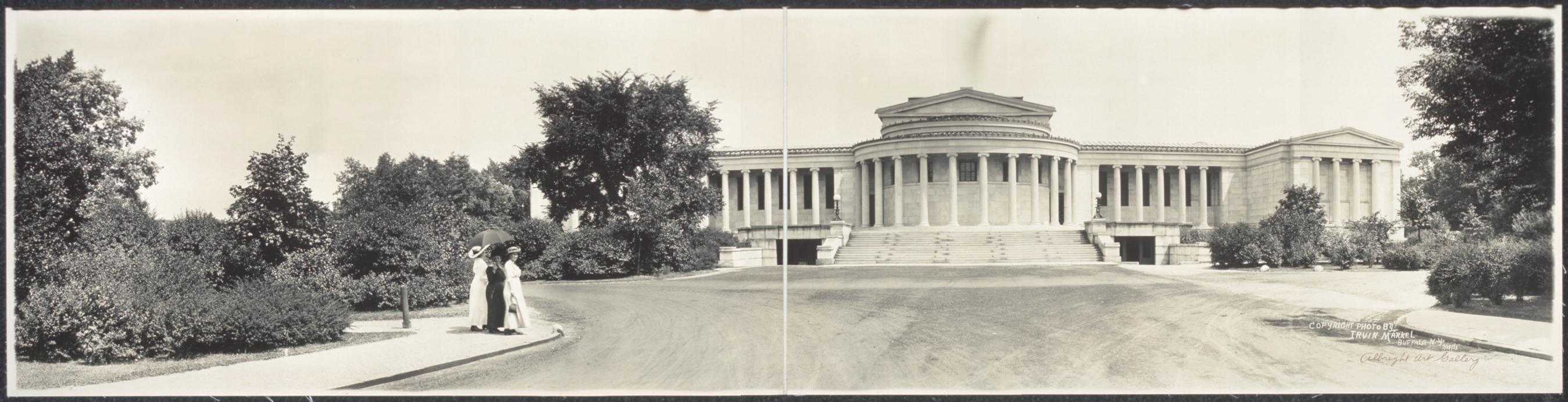
Albright-Knox Art Gallery in 1913

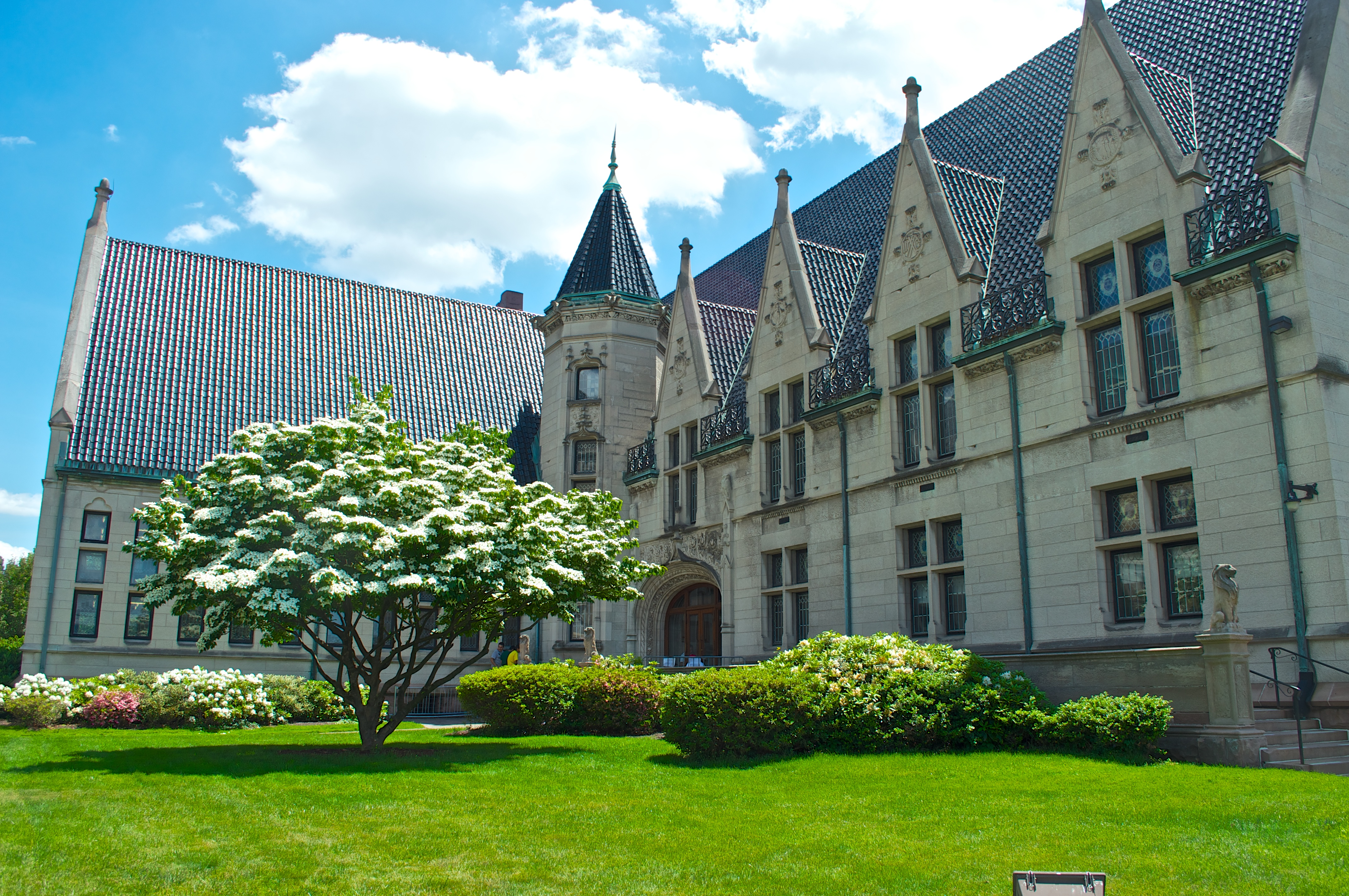
Albright Memorial Building

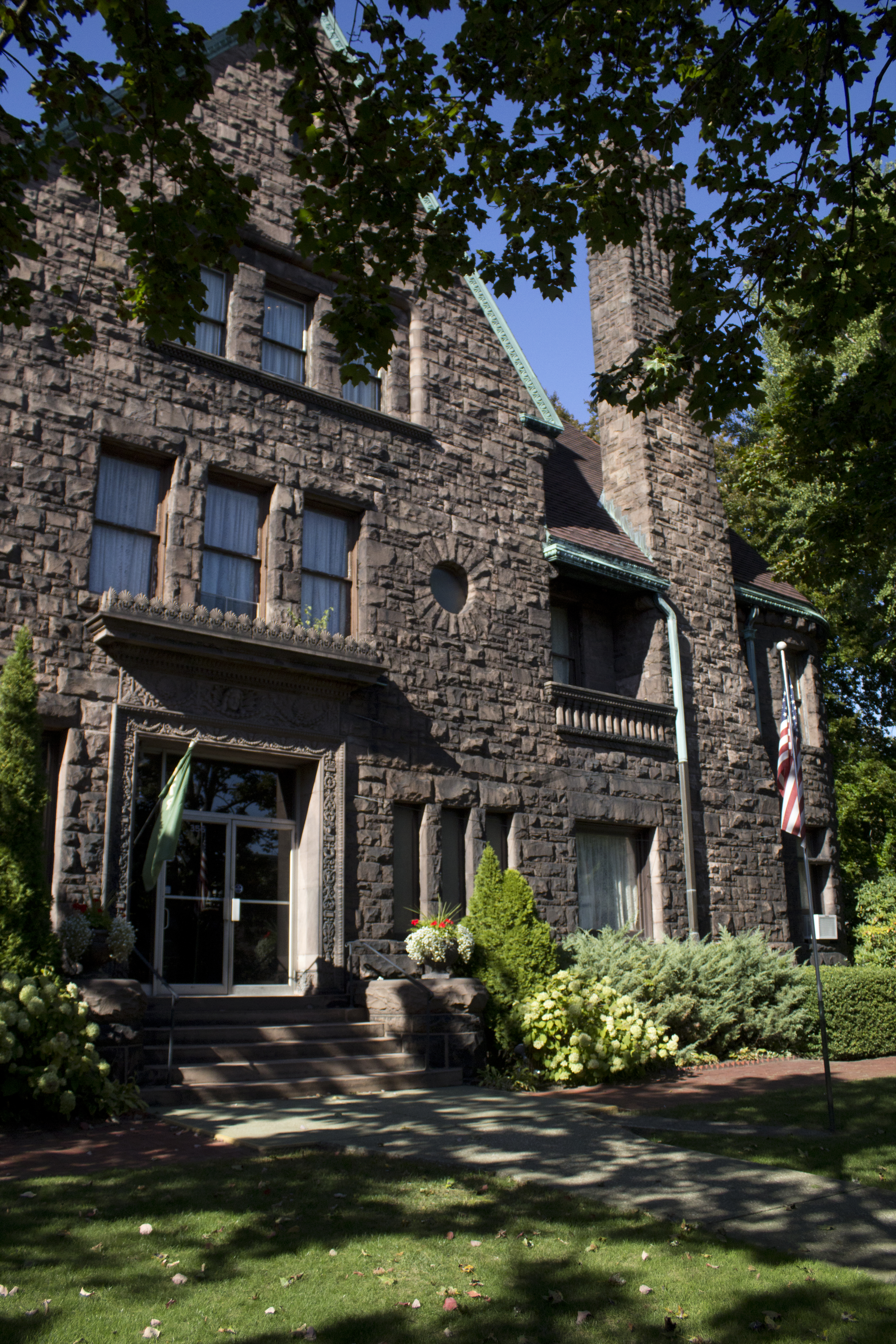
Watson-Curtze Mansion

== See also ==
- Esenwein & Johnson
