= Kibler =

Kibler may refer to:

- Kibler, Arkansas, a city in Crawford County, Arkansas, United States
- Kibler Park, a suburb of Johannesburg, South Africa
- Kibler High School, a historic high school building located at the city of Tonawanda in Erie County, New York
- Kibler (surname)
