= EB Green =

EB Green may refer to:

- Edward Brodhead Green (1855–1950), American architect
- EB Green or EB green, green duct tape used by defense contractor Electric Boat
