= Wing Hall (Ithaca, New York) =

- U.S. National Register of Historic Places
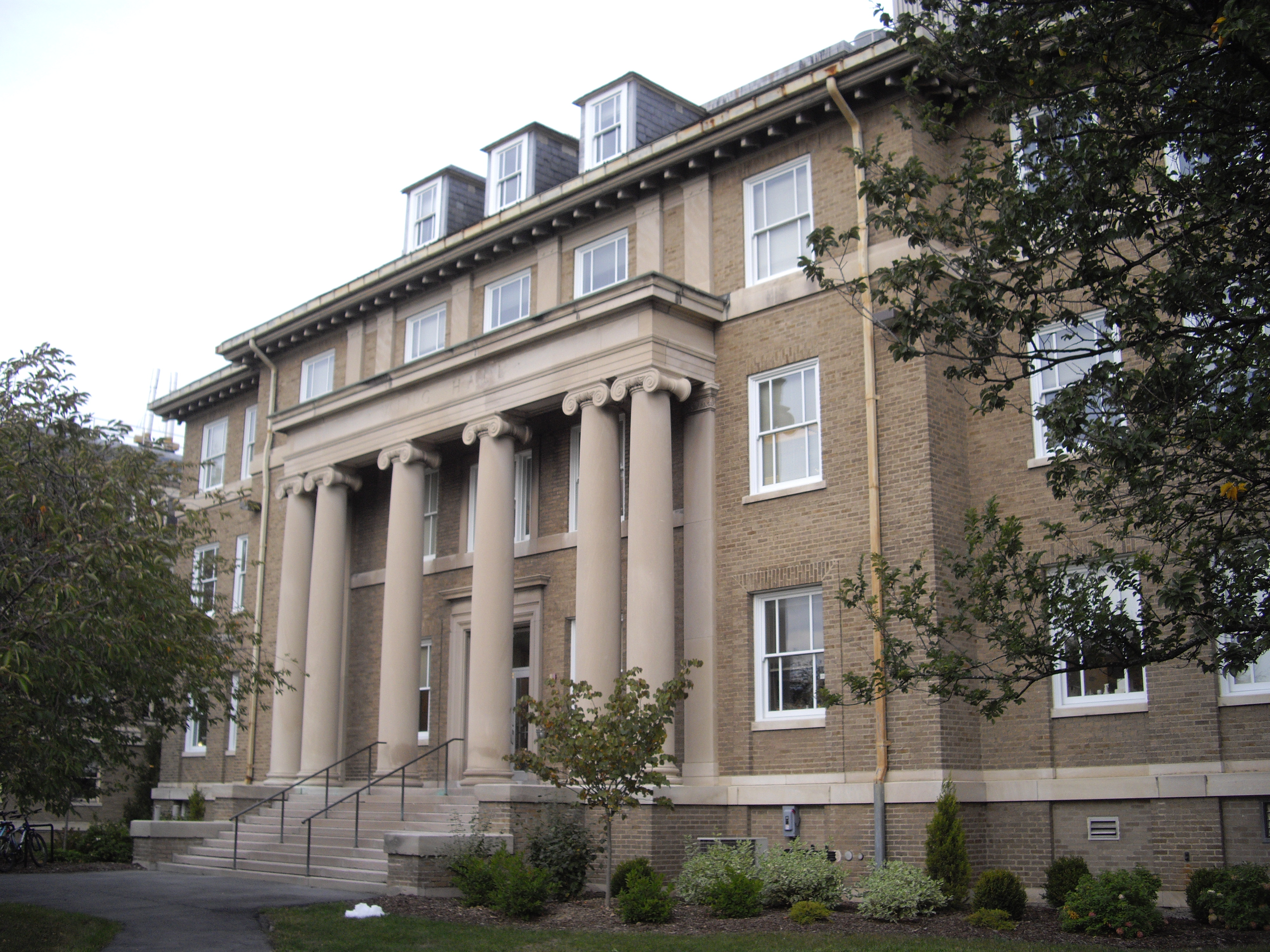

- Location within New York Location within the United States
- Location: Ithaca, New York
- Coordinates: 42°26′49.08″N 76°28′18.97″W
- Built: 1912-1914
- Built by: Durolithic Co.
- Architect: Green & Wicks
- Architectural style: Classical Revival
- MPS: New York State College of Agriculture TR
- NRHP reference No.: 84003204
- Added to NRHP: September 24, 1984

Wing Hall is a building on the campus of Cornell University that was built during 1912–1914. It was listed on the National Register of Historic Places in 1984. Wing Hall was designed by architect E.B. Green, himself a Cornell alumnus, of Buffalo architectural firm Green & Wicks.

Along with Fernow Hall and Caldwell Hall, designed by the same firm, it was funded by a New York State appropriation in 1912.

It is a three-story building. Its main entrance is centered in its long elevation, with a central bay projecting slightly from flanking walls. It has a two-story three-bay-wide Ionic-columned portico, with pilasters defining the bays of the third story above.

It was built for teaching of animal husbandry, and was located near recently built university barns, about one-half mile east of the original college buildings. Its NRHP nomination describes that "It combined extensive practical laboratory space with a library 'containing the herd and flock books of different breeds' and an auditorium into which live animals could be brought."
