= Bailey Hall (Ithaca, New York) =

Building at Cornell University in Ithaca, New York

- U.S. National Register of Historic Places
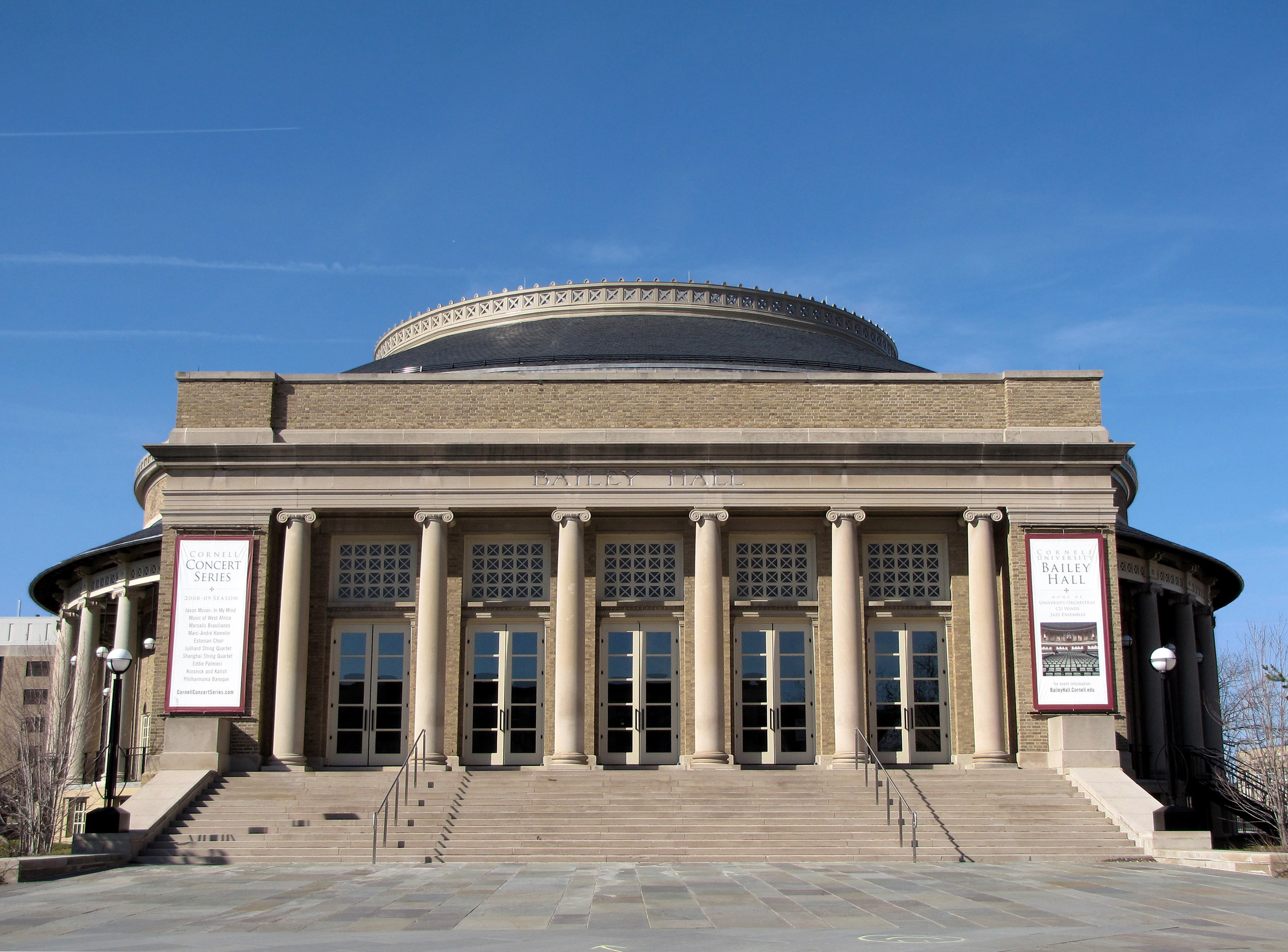
- Bailey Hall, the largest auditorium at Cornell University

- Location within New York Location within the United States
- Location: Cornell University, Ithaca, New York, U.S.
- Coordinates: 42°26′56.5″N 76°28′48.5″W
- Built: 1912
- Architect: Green and Wicks
- Architectural style: Greek Revival
- MPS: New York State College of Agriculture TR
- NRHP reference No.: 84003113
- Added to NRHP: September 24, 1984

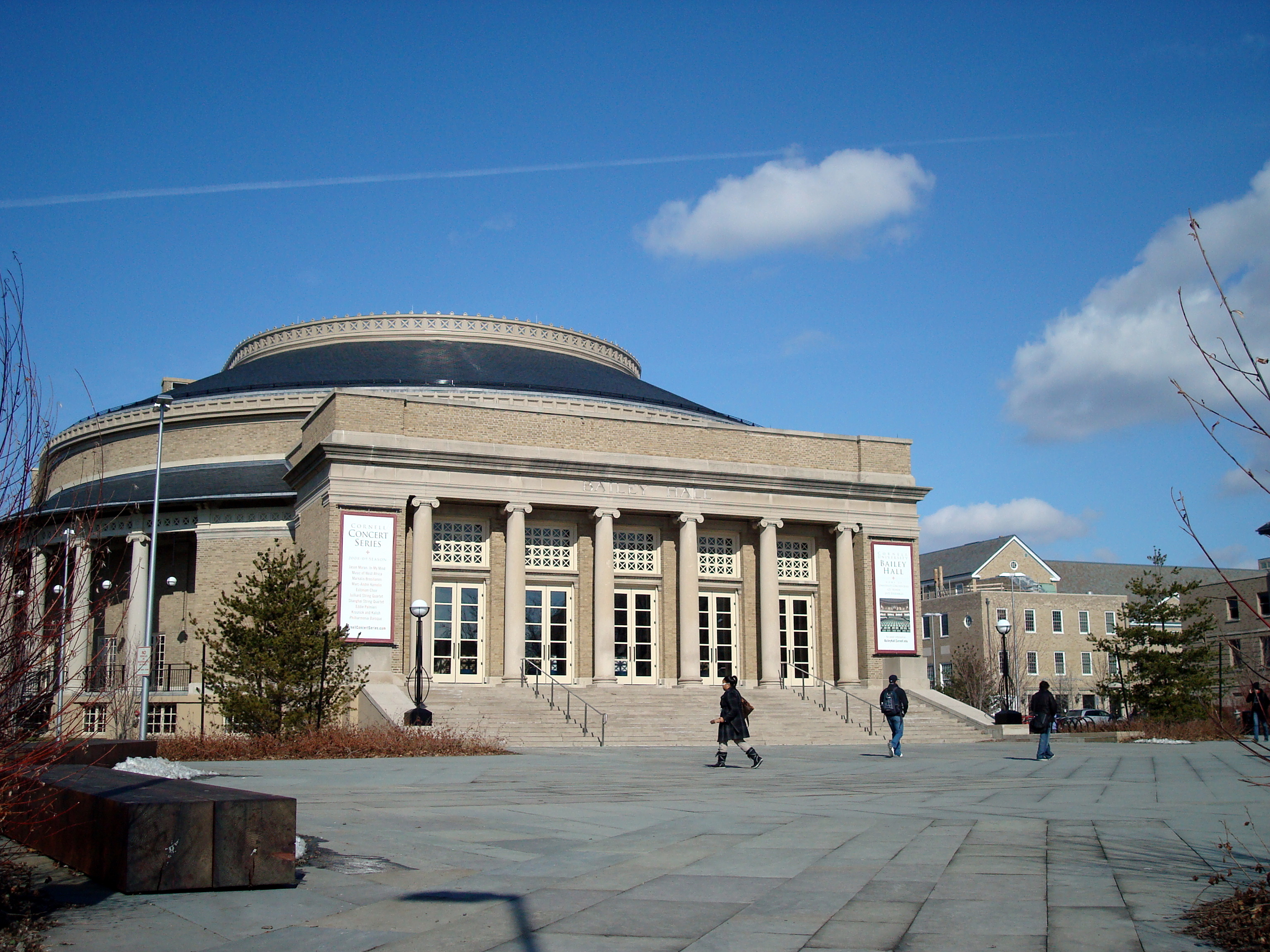
Bailey Hall seen from the southwest in February 2009

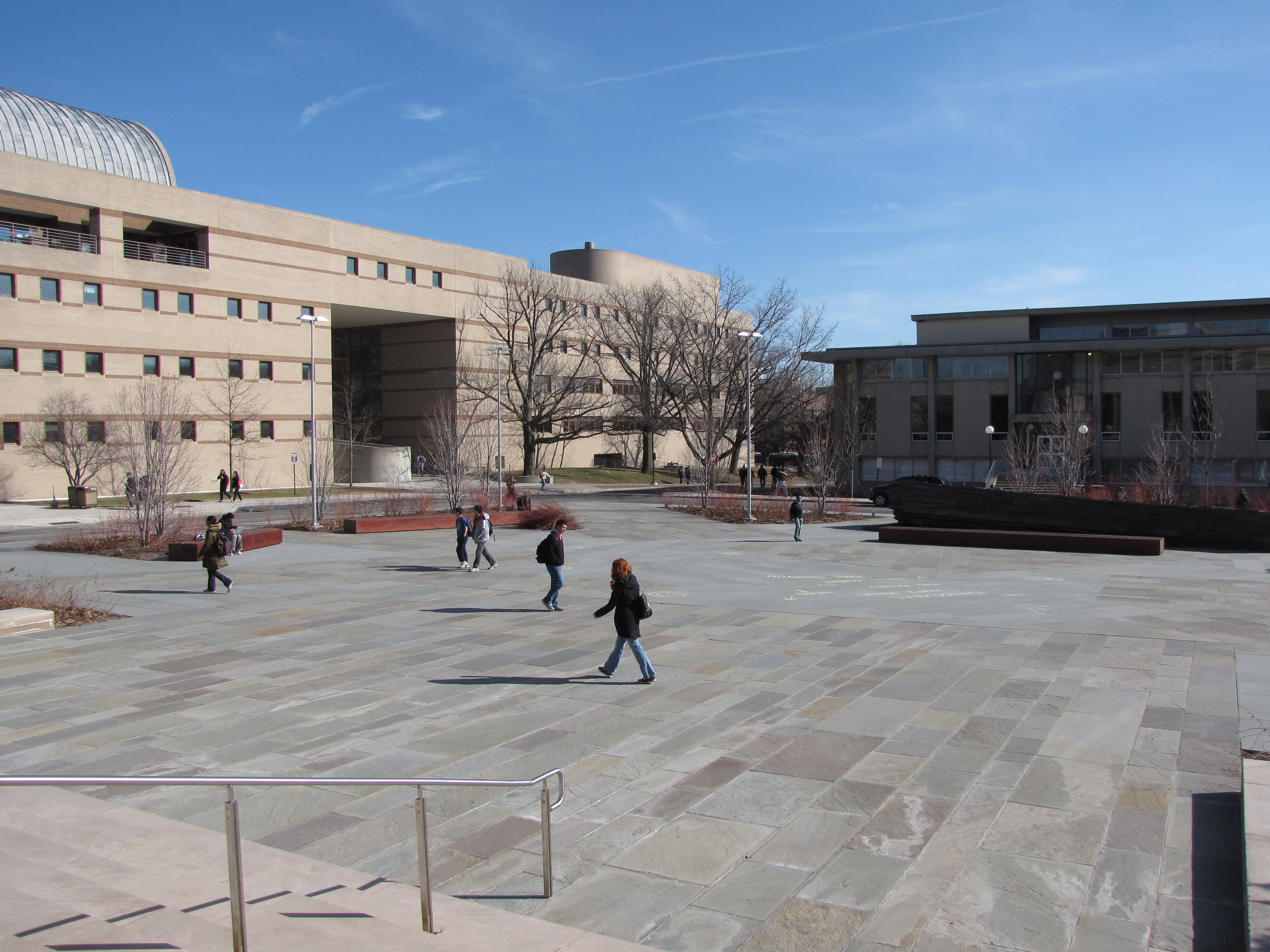
Bailey Plaza seen from the steps of Bailey Hall with the inclined fountain visible on the right in March 2009

Bailey Hall is the largest auditorium at Cornell University, an Ivy League university in Ithaca, New York. The auditorium seats 1,300 people, and it is named for Liberty Hyde Bailey, the first dean of what is now Cornell's College of Agriculture and Life Sciences.

== History ==
=== 20th century ===
Bailey Hall was constructed in 1912, according to the Greek Revival architecture design of Buffalo-based architect Edward Brodhead Green, an 1878 graduate of Cornell University. It is shaped as an amphitheatre, with a colonnaded portico wrapping around its south side, and monumental stairs leading up to 11-foot main doors.

It was built by New York state and initially intended for use by Cornell University agriculture students, but it also filled the need for a large auditorium that could be used by the entire university.

As originally configured, Bailey seated 1,948. It was described as having "acoustics by God, seats by Torquemada," a reference to its wooden seats and severely raked floor.

In 1984, Bailey Hall was added to the National Register of Historic Places.

=== 21st century ===
In 2006, the building reopened after a major rehabilitation which brought it up to modern building codes and made it handicapped-accessible, albeit at the cost of several hundred seats of audience capacity.

The road and small parking lot immediately in front of Bailey were converted into a pedestrian plaza which was opened to the public in 2007. The flagstones of the plaza are hewn from bluestone, similar to the material used to construct the Stone Row on the Arts Quad. Some of the stones were thermally treated to alter their colors to achieve a cosmetic effect.

The benches ringing the plaza extend to 300 feet in length, each having been hewn from a single Oregon Douglas fir. A fountain carved from local stone into a natural, sloping shape invoking Ithaca's gorges is featured on the southern edge of the plaza.
