= Kabler =

Kabler is a surname. Notable people with the surname include:

- Carole Jo Kabler (1938–2017), American golfer
- Jackie Kabler (born 1966), British television presenter
- Roger Kabler, American actor

== See also ==
- Kibler (surname)
