= Watson-Curtze Mansion =

Historic mansion in Erie, Pennsylvania, United States

- U.S. National Register of Historic Places
- Location within Pennsylvania Location within the United States
- Interactive map showing the location of Watson-Curtze House
- Location: 356 W. 6th St., Erie, Pennsylvania
- Coordinates: 42°7′35″N 80°5′36″W
- Area: less than one acre
- Built: 1891–1892
- Architect: Green & Wicks
- Architectural style: Richardsonian Romanesque
- NRHP reference No.: 83002244
- Added to NRHP: July 16, 1983

Watson-Curtze Mansion, is a historic home located at Erie, Erie County, Pennsylvania designed by Green & Wicks and built in 1891–92.

== History ==
The mansion was designed by the Buffalo architectural firm of Green & Wicks and built in 1891–1892. It is a 3 1/2-story, two-bay, brownstone mansion in the Richardsonian Romanesque style. It features a short tower, smooth piers with decorated capitals, windows with transoms, carved tympanum, and deep-set windows. The 24-room home also has stained glass windows, oak flooring, 12 fireplaces, and a solarium. Also on the property is a contributing carriage house.

The mansion features pierced and hand-carved woodwork, mosaics, stained glass and friezes. There are Tiffany light fixtures including decorative motifs with cherubs, peacocks, leaves, and shells.

=== Ownership ===
The home was built by Harrison F. Watson (1853–1904), an Erie roofing paper magnate and holder of U.S. Patents on gaskets and tubes. Harrison and his wife, Carrie Tracy, an avid gardener, lived in the home with their daughter, Winifred, until 1923.

In 1923, Frederic Felix Curtze (1858–1941), president of the Erie Trust Company, purchased the home and lived at the property until his death in 1941, when his family donated the property and it officially became a museum. Today, the Mansion is owned by the Erie County Historical Society and is operated as a historic house museum.

=== National Register of Historic Places ===
It was added to the National Register of Historic Places in 1983. It is located in the West Sixth Street Historic District.
