= YMCA Central Building (Buffalo, New York) =

Historic building in Buffalo, New York

Olympic Towers
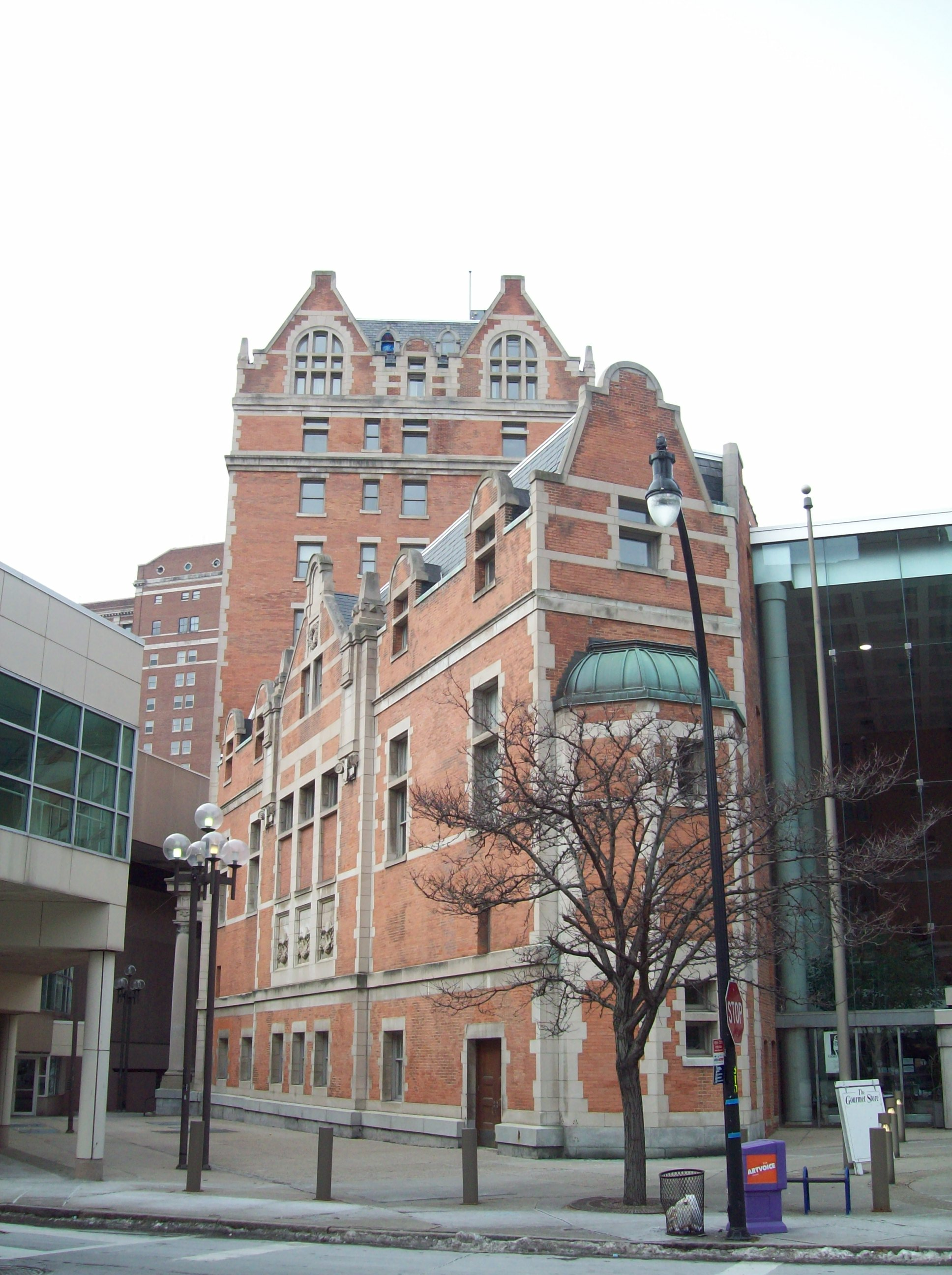
- Former names: YMCA Central Building, YMCA Building

General information
- Status: Completed
- Architectural style: English-Flemish Revival
- Location: 45 W. Mohawk St. / 300 Pearl Street, Buffalo, New York, United States
- Current tenants: General Services Administration, Food and Drug Administration
- Construction started: 1901
- Completed: 1902

Height
- Height: 160.76 feet (49.0 m)

Technical details
- Structural system: rigid frame
- Floor count: 11
- Floor area: 180,000 ft (55,000 m)
- Lifts/elevators: 2

Design and construction
- Architecture firm: Green & Wicks

References
- YMCA Central Building
- U.S. National Register of Historic Places
- New York State Register of Historic Places
- Location within New York Location within the United States
- Location: 45 W. Mohawk St., Buffalo, New York
- Coordinates: 42°53′15″N 78°52′33″W
- Area: 0.3 acres (0.12 ha)
- Built: 1902
- Architects: Green & Wicks
- Architectural style: Renaissance, English-Flemish Renaissance
- NRHP reference No.: 83001676
- NYSRHP No.: 02940.003061

Significant dates
- Added to NRHP: September 8, 1983
- Designated NYSRHP: August 5, 1983

The YMCA Central Building or Olympic Towers as the building is now known, is a historic YMCA building located at Buffalo in Erie County, New York. The tan-colored brick building with sandstone accents was designed by noted local architects Green & Wicks and constructed in 1901–1902. The building was home to the third oldest YMCA chapter in North America until converted to office use in the early 1980s.

== History ==
The building complex consists of an English-Flemish Revival style building with a 10-story tower, a 4-story glass and steel office structure which was added in 1986, and a 4-story connecting atrium.

In January 2012, the building was sold for US$2.5 million.

It was listed on the National Register of Historic Places in 1983.
