= Ransom School "Pagoda" =

- U.S. National Register of Historic Places
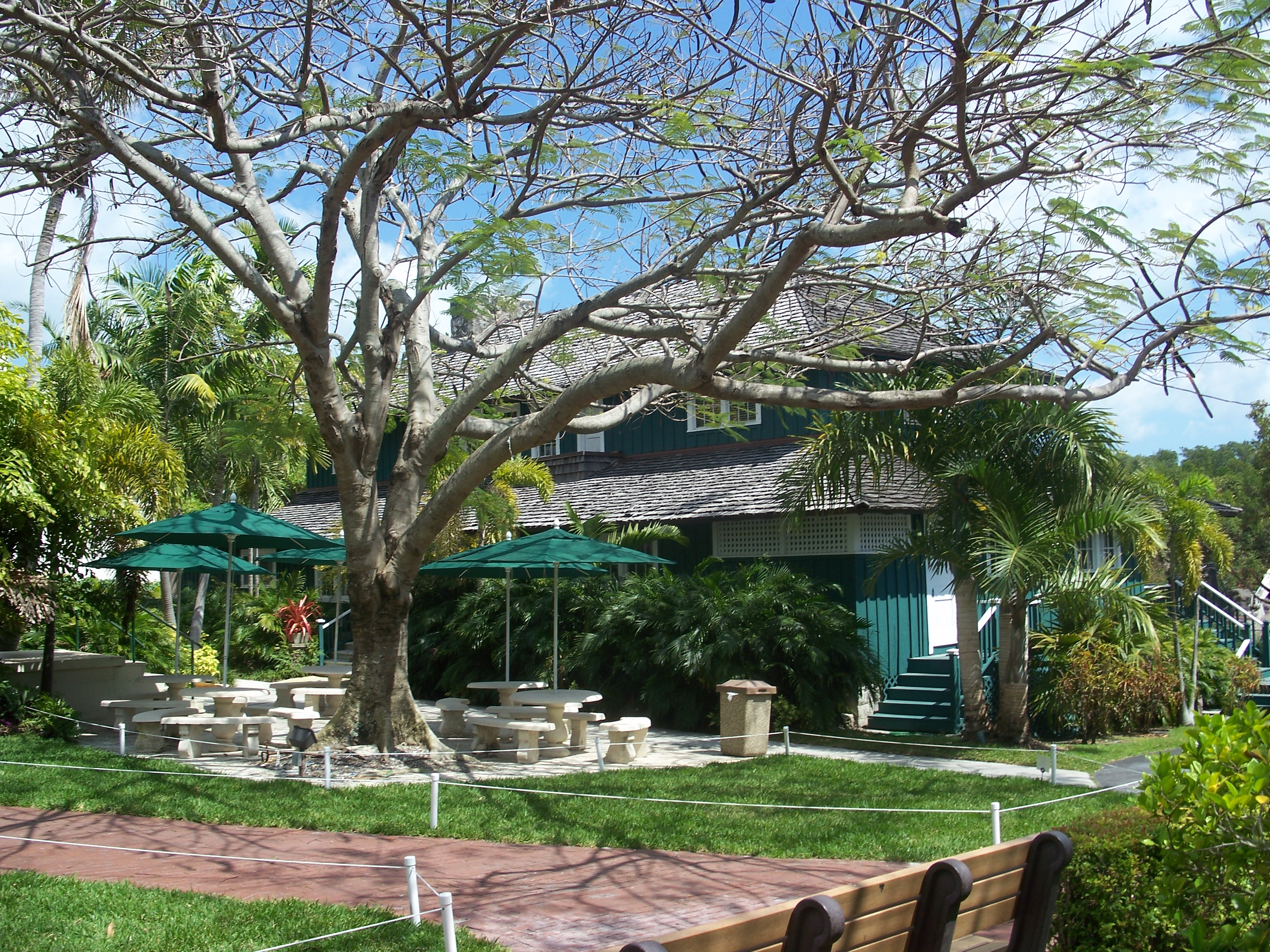

- Location within Miami Location within Florida Location within the United States
- Location: 3575 Main Highway, Miami, Florida
- Coordinates: 25°43′22.5654″N 80°14′38.043″W
- Built: 1902
- Architect: Green and Wicks
- Architectural style: Frame Vernacular with Chinese influence
- NRHP reference No.: 73000572
- Added to NRHP: July 25, 1973

The Ransom Everglades School "Pagoda" is a historic school building at 3575 Main Highway in Coconut Grove, Miami, Florida. On July 25, 1973, it was added to the U.S. National Register of Historic Places as the Ransom School "Pagoda".

The Pagoda was built in 1902 as the principal structure for a school first known as Pine Knot Camp by the Buffalo, New York, architects Green and Wicks. It has been described as looking "about as Chinese as a hamburger". Later the name of the school was changed to the Adirondack-Florida School, then Ransom School, and finally Ransom Everglades after merging with The Everglades School for Girls in 1974.
