= The Marin =

Highrise in Buffalo, New York

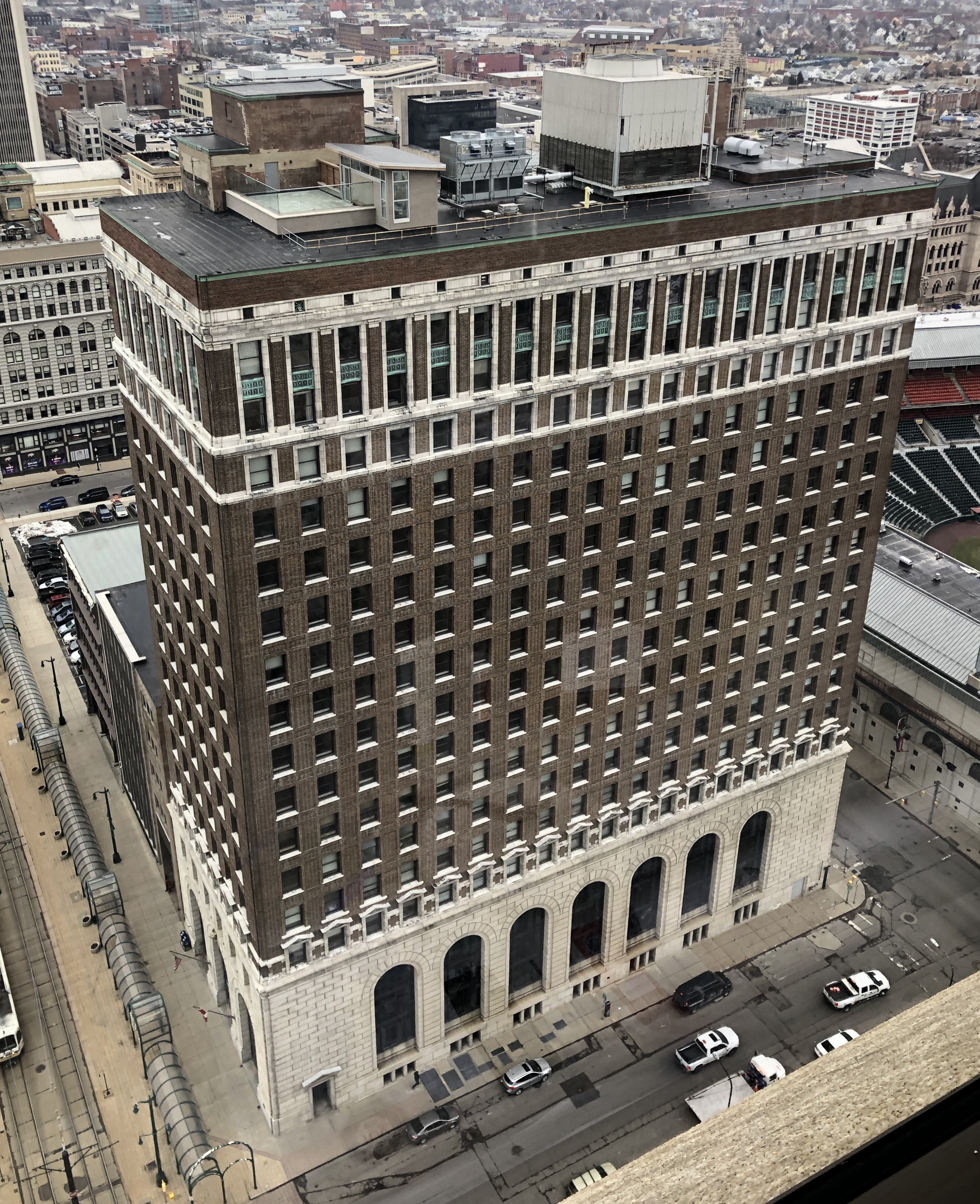
- The Marin, in Buffalo, New York
- Interactive map of the The Marin area
- Former names: Main Seneca Building; Marine Midland Trust Company

General information
- Status: Completed
- Type: Office
- Location: 237 Main Street, Buffalo, New York, United States
- Coordinates: 42.8807°N 78.8759°W
- Completed: April, 1913
- Owner: Main Street Buffalo Properties, LP
- Management: Priam Enterprises LLC

Height
- Roof: 76.2 m (250 ft)

Technical details
- Floor count: 17

Design and construction
- Architect: Green & Wicks
- Developer: Lnquist and Illsey

The Marin, previously the Main Seneca Building, and originally known as the Marine Midland Trust Company Building or the "Marine Trust Building," is a 17-story Renaissance Revival style highrise in downtown Buffalo, New York. The building was previously the headquarters for Marine Midland Bank before the bank constructed One Marine Midland Center at 1 Seneca Tower, the tallest building in Buffalo. It is located in the Joseph Ellicott Historic District.

== History ==
The building was designed by Buffalo architects Green & Wicks and was completed by Lnquist and Illsey in April 1913 on the corner of Main and Seneca streets. The building served as the headquarters for Marine Midland Bank before moving across the street into Buffalo's tallest building, One Seneca Tower.

In December 2014, the building was sold by real estate developer David L. Sweet to Paul J. Kolkmeyer, a developer and former CEO of First Niagara Bank, for $3.89 million. Kolkmeyer's firm, Amherst-based Priam Enterprises LLC, buys, manages and develops residential apartment buildings and student housing in Buffalo and the surrounding communities. In addition to purchasing the Main Seneca Building, Kolkmeyer purchased the Main Court Building at 43 Main St. (for $4.5 million), as well as the Rand Building, designed by F. J. & W. A. Kidd, at 14 Lafayette Square, the Roblin Building at 241 Main St., (together for $2.56 million) and The Stanton Building (also known as the Glenny Building), designed by Richard A. Waite, at 251 Main St. (for $646,569).

Paul Kolkmeyer is planning to introduce several new uses to the building. According to Business First, Kolkmeyer expects to put 25 condominiums on the building's top five floors and open a banquet facility in the first floor banking hall. Additionally, he has indicated his desire to put a small boutique hotel into the third floor, and consolidate office tenants into the remaining levels.

The public face of the Main Seneca Building has been Andrew J Shaevel who advised potential buyer David Nalbandyan in their attempt to purchase the building now works alongside Paul Kolkmeyer in the revitalization of the property. Shaevel and Kolkmeyer joined forces however to revitalize the property where they hosted the first event on June 11, 2018, at "The Admiral Room at the Marin" the new name for the Main Seneca Building

== See also ==
- List of tallest buildings in Buffalo, New York
- Marine Midland Bank
