= Twentieth Century Club (Buffalo, New York) =

- U.S. National Register of Historic Places
- U.S. Historic district – Contributing property
- New York State Register of Historic Places
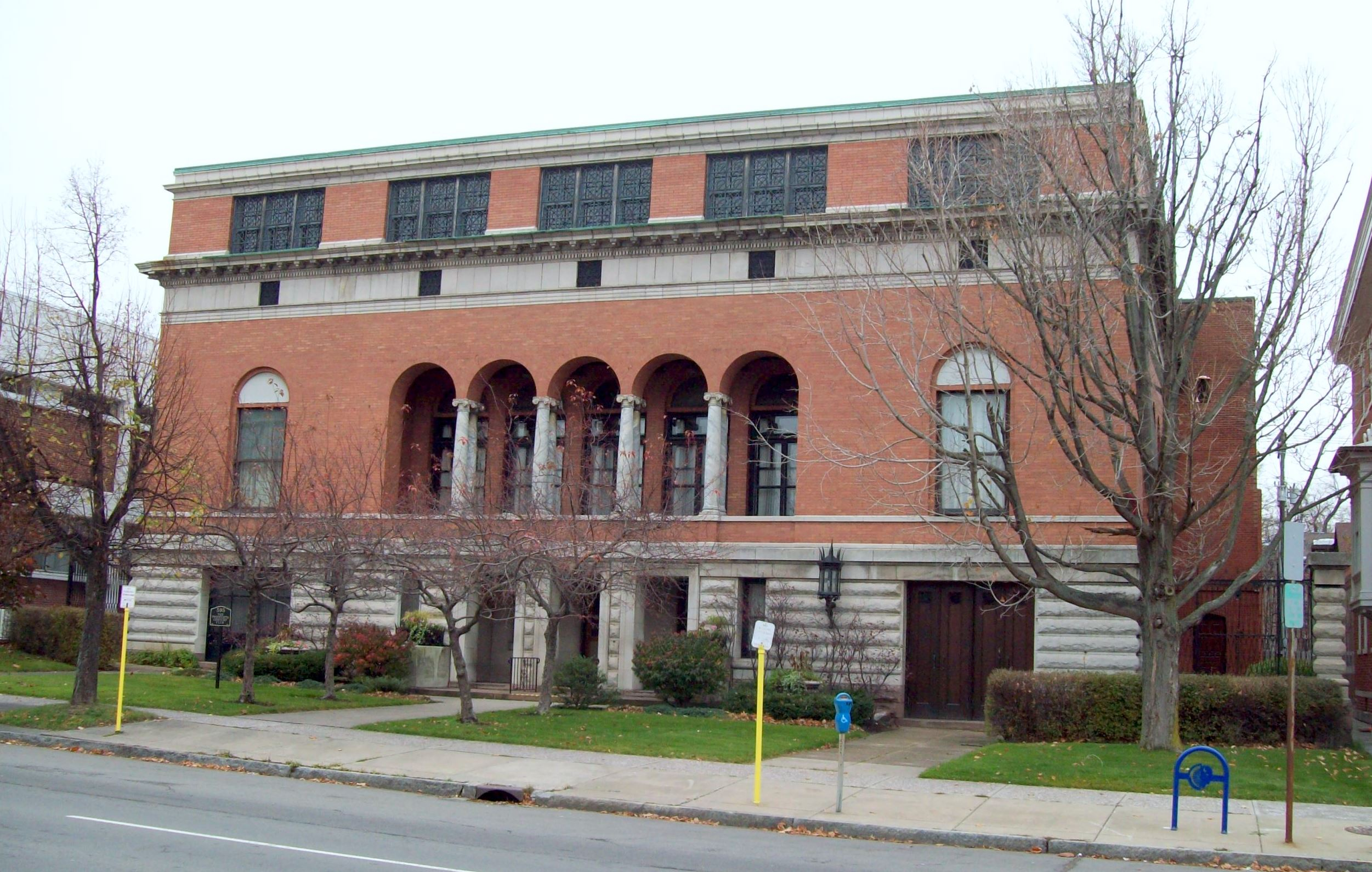
- East elevation, 2010

- Location within New York Location within the United States
- Location: 595 Delaware Avenue, Buffalo, New York
- Coordinates: 42°54′1″N 78°52′23″W
- Built: 1894
- Architect: Green & Wicks
- Architectural style: Renaissance Revival
- NRHP reference No.: 11000270
- NYSRHP No.: 02940.001052

Significant dates
- Added to NRHP: May 11, 2011
- Designated NYSRHP: March 24, 2011

The Twentieth Century Club is a women's social club founded in the late 19th century in Buffalo, New York, at 595 Delaware Avenue in the Delaware District. It was the first club run by women, for women, in the United States.

The club developed out of the Graduates Association of the Buffalo Seminary, spearheaded by Charlotte Mulligan, a teacher, writer and musician. She envisioned a club rich in tradition, education, and culture. Many lavish social events were held here, while education was the primary activity. Starting with an 1894 lecture on Abraham Lincoln, and continuing through the present, it has a long tradition of presenting speakers and programs on a wide variety of subjects. Its history parallels and chronicles the history of events in Buffalo and the enormous societal changes that occurred since its founding.

In 1894, the club purchased the present property and hired the firm of Green & Wicks to design a clubhouse to add to the front of an existing Baptist church. The clubhouse is a three-story building in the Italian renaissance style. The building is 78 feet wide and 96 feet deep. The first story is of Indiana limestone and the rest of the structure of pressed brick, of a warm red tone, with a cornice of terra cotta. The Ionic order pillars across the front of the second story are of blue marble. The original church structure at the rear of the lot was demolished in 1904 and a gymnasium, pool, showers, and a hot room were added. Additional land and a formal garden were added to the rear of the property in 1933.

In 2011, the building was listed on the National Register of Historic Places.

The club operates under 501(c)(7) Social and Recreation Clubs. In 2025 it claimed $639,164 in revenue and $2,307,956 in total assets.

== See also ==
- National Register of Historic Places listings in Buffalo, New York
