= Kibler High School =

- U.S. National Register of Historic Places
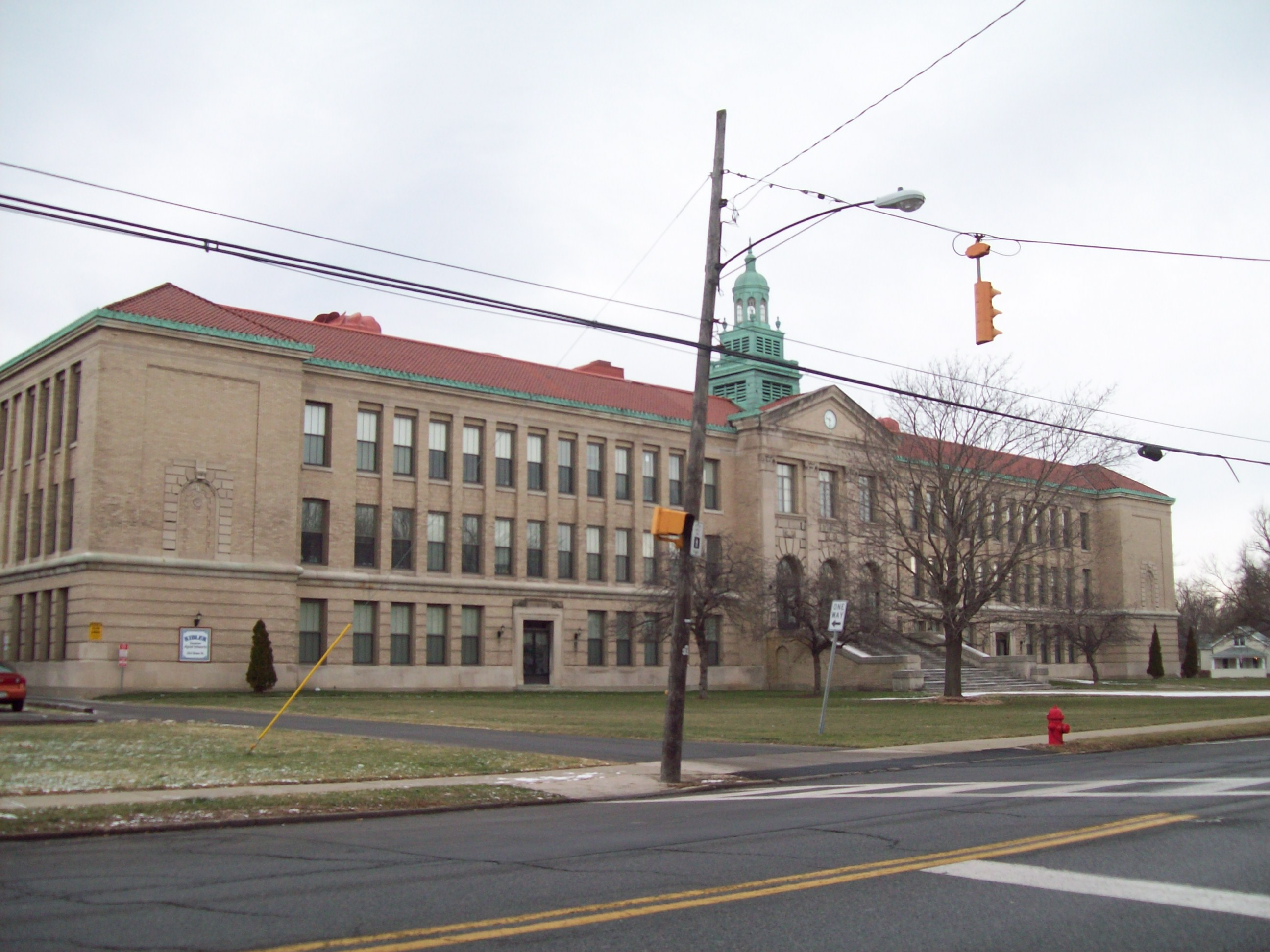
- Kibler High School Building, December 2009

- Location within New York Location within the United States
- Location: 284 Main St., Tonawanda, New York
- Coordinates: 43°00′42″N 78°52′50″W
- Area: 3.5 acres (1.4 ha)
- Built: 1925
- Architect: Green, Edward B. & Sons; Braas Bros. Co.
- Architectural style: Classical Revival
- NRHP reference No.: 98001612
- Added to NRHP: January 15, 1999

Kibler High School is a historic high school building located at the city of Tonawanda in Erie County, New York. It was designed by the Buffalo architectural firm of Edward B. Green, & Sons and constructed in 1925 in the Classical Revival style. The exterior features a rusticated ground floor, central entrance pavilion with pilasters and pediment, an elaborately decorated cupola, and red tile hip roofs. The school was named for the president of the Tonawanda Board of Education in 1924, William J. Kibler. The building functioned as a school until 1983. The building was renovated as senior housing in the mid-2000s.

It was listed on the National Register of Historic Places in 1999.
