= Kibler (surname) =

Kibler is a surname. Notable people with the surname include:

- Drew Kibler (born 2000), American swimmer
- John Kibler (1929–2010), American baseball umpire
- Brian Kibler (born 1980), American game designer
- Tom Kibler (1886–1971), American baseball player, coach, athletics administrator, and baseball executive
