= Edward Brodhead Green =

American architect

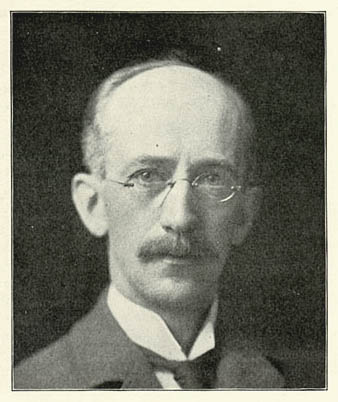
- Born: May 10, 1855; Utica, New York, U.S.
- Died: February 11, 1950 (aged 94); Buffalo, New York, U.S.
- Education: Cornell University
- Occupation: Architect
- Spouse: Harriet B. Edson (m. 1887; died 1935)
- Awards: Fellow of the American Institute of Architects (1890)
- Practice: Green & Wicks, Edward B. Green & Son

Edward Brodhead Green (May 10, 1855 – February 2, 1950), very often referred to as E. B. Green, was a major American architect from New York state.

== Early life and education ==
Green was born in Utica, New York, on May 10, 1855.

He attended Cornell University in Ithaca, New York, graduating with a bachelor of architecture degree in 1878. Following his graduation, Green was the thir? architect to be registered by the State University of New York.

== Career ==
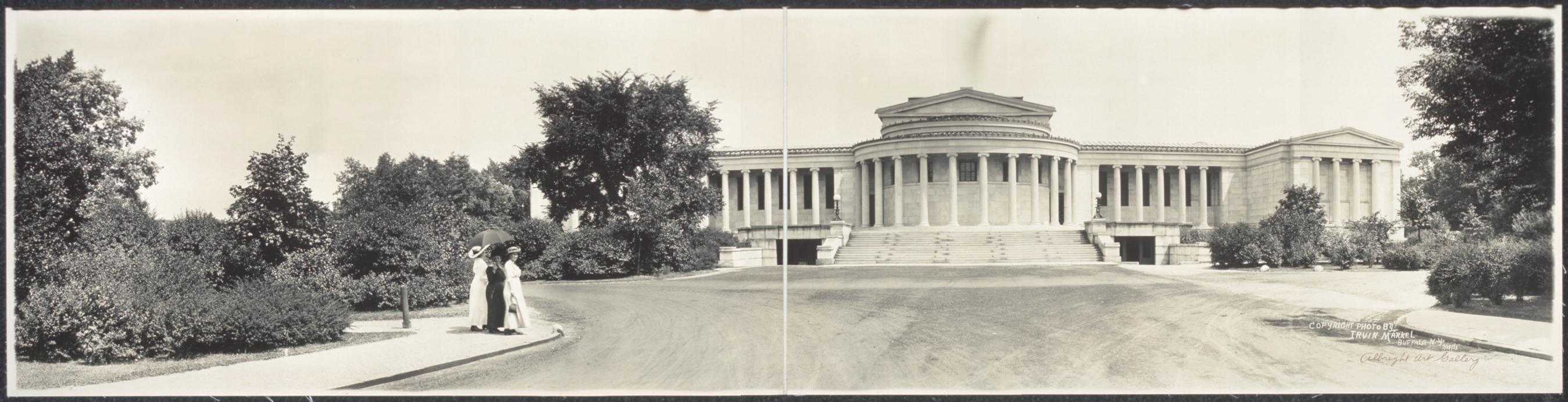
Albright Art Gallery in 1913; designed by Green and built between 1890 and 1905 for the Pan-American Exposition in Buffalo, New York

After graduation, Green worked as a junior architect with William Miller in Ithaca for three years while teaching at Cornell for one year. In 1880, along with William Sydney Wicks, an M.I.T. architecture graduate, he opened a practice in Auburn, New York, moving a year later to 69 Genesee Street in Buffalo, New York, in 1881.

Through approximately 1940, Green was active in Buffalo, New York, where his work left a lasting impression on the city of Buffalo, and it includes such noteworthy structures as the Albright-Knox Art Gallery, Young Men's Christian Association Central Building, and Twentieth Century Club (1894); all three listed on the National Register of Historic Places. His public buildings include the Buffalo Savings Bank, the Market Arcade, the Buffalo Crematory, and South Park High School, The First Presbyterian Church of Buffalo, Kibler High School, Tonawanda Municipal Building, and Dayton Art Institute (1930) among others.

In Canada, Green made the designs for several structures owned by the Ontario Power Company at Niagara Falls, Ontario.

He also designed and built many private residences, including the Charles W. Goodyear Residence, Granger Mansion, and his own residence at 180 Summer Street, which is not visible from the road. During his 72-year career, he designed more than 370 major structures. More than 160 of his Buffalo buildings survive today.

After the death of his partner Wicks in 1919, he continued the practice with his son, Edward B. Green Jr., and then with R.M. James from 1936 to 1950.

== Personal life ==
In 1887, Green was married to Harriet Edson (1858–1935). Together, they were the parents of:

- Edward Brodhead Green Jr. (1888–1933), also an architect.
- Cornelia Green (1890–1959)
- Paul Edson Green (1892–1957), also an architect.

Green died in Buffalo on February 2, 1950, after a two-week illness. He was buried in Forest Lawn Cemetery.

== See also ==
- Esenwein & Johnson
- Green and Wicks
