= Birge-Horton House =

Historic house in New York, United States

- U.S. National Register of Historic Places
- U.S. Historic district – Contributing property
- New York State Register of Historic Places
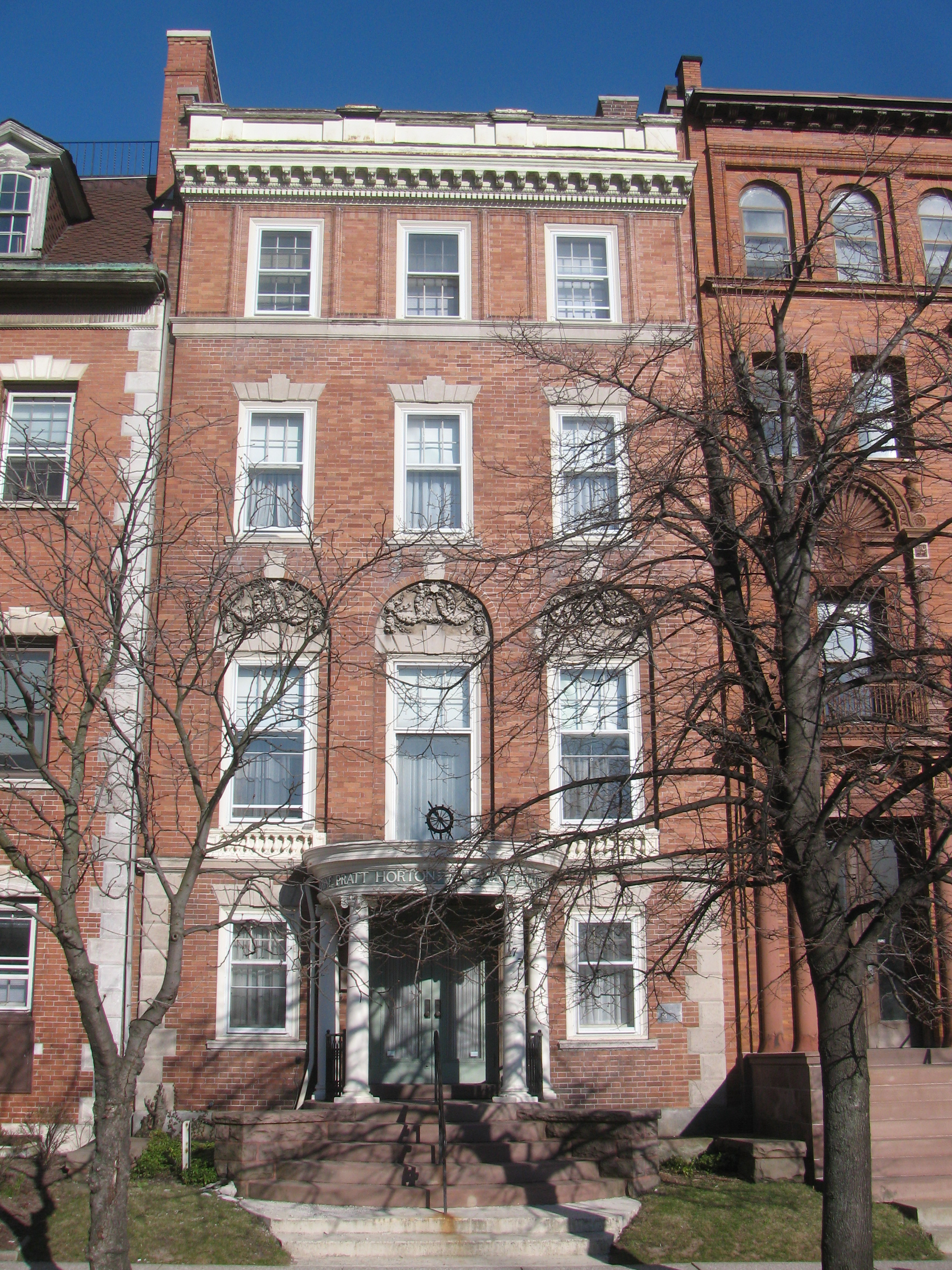
- Birge-Horton House, April 2009

- Location within New York Location within the United States
- Location: 477 Delaware Ave., Buffalo, New York
- Coordinates: 42°53′49.9″N 78°52′27.7″W
- Area: less than one acre
- Built: 1895
- Architect: Green and Wicks
- Architectural style: Classical Revival
- Part of: Allentown Historic District (ID80002605)
- NRHP reference No.: 04000703
- NYSRHP No.: 02940.000844

Significant dates
- Added to NRHP: July 16, 2004
- Designated NYSRHP: April 20, 2004

Birge-Horton House is a historic home located at Buffalo in Erie County, New York. It was designed in 1895 by the Buffalo architectural firm of Green and Wicks and is a Georgian Revival style row house in "The Midway" section of Delaware Avenue. It is a four-story brick house with stone trim. The house is situated within the boundaries of the Allentown Historic District.

The Birge-Horton House was listed on the National Register of Historic Places in 2004.

== History & Design ==
Delaware Avenue, in the early 19th century, was the principal residential street in Buffalo and consisted of many freestanding mansions and clubs in addition to these row houses. The site chosen for these homes was referred to as "the Midway " since it was located halfway between Niagara Square (city center) and Forest Lawn Cemetery.

The Birge-Horton House, an example of a Georgian Revival row house, was designed by Buffalo architects E. B. Green and W. S. Wicks for Henry and Fanny Birge. Mr. Birge was a partner in the Birge Wallpaper Co. The Birge-Horton House is four stories high, three bays wide, and constructed of brick with stone trim. On the exterior, each floor of the home is distinguished by various architectural features. The interior includes a staircase rising four stories, six marble fireplaces, leaded lay lights, and leaded windows. It is the only home in the row that remains as built.

The Birge-Horton House was the last of the thirteen luxury row houses built from 1893 to 1895. These four-story houses were unique in Buffalo. Although each house in the row is the work of various architects and of different designs, they give an overall appearance of unified composition because of similarities in height, width, and construction materials.

In 1906, Katharine Pratt Horton took up residence, renting the property until 1920 when she purchased the house from Fanny Birge. It remained her residence until her death in 1931. At that time, the Buffalo Chapter of the Daughters of the American Revolution inherited the home. Since then the Katharine Pratt Horton, Buffalo chapter of the Daughters of the American Revolution has maintained the house much the way it was when Mrs. Horton lived in it.

=== Owners ===
- 1895-1906 - Henry and Fanny Birge
- 1906-1931 - Katharine Pratt Horton
- 1931–Present - Buffalo chapter of the Daughters of the American Revolution

== See also ==
- Architecture of Buffalo, New York
- National Register of Historic Places listings in Buffalo, New York
