= Architecture of Buffalo, New York =

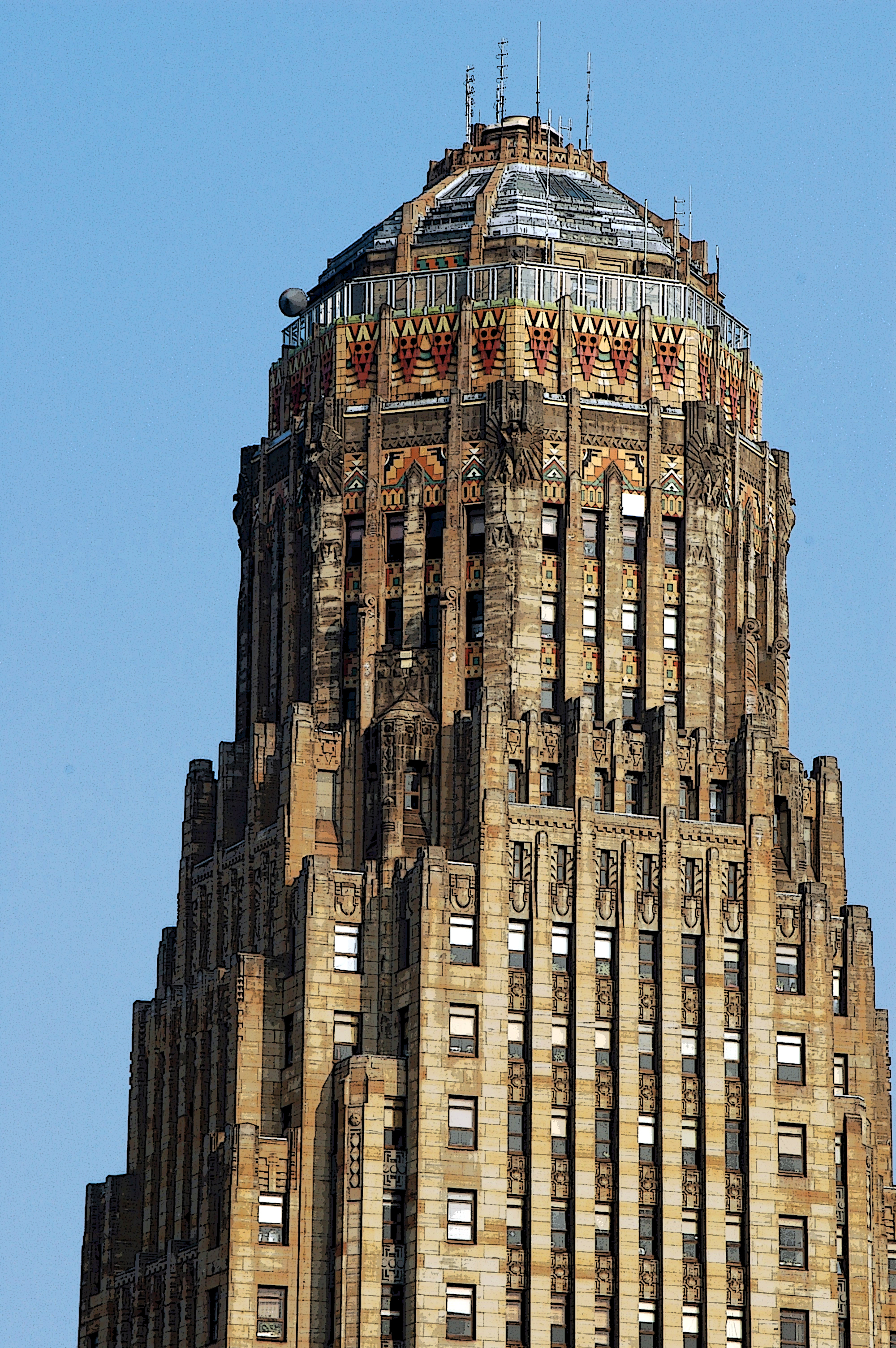
Art Deco detail of Buffalo City Hall

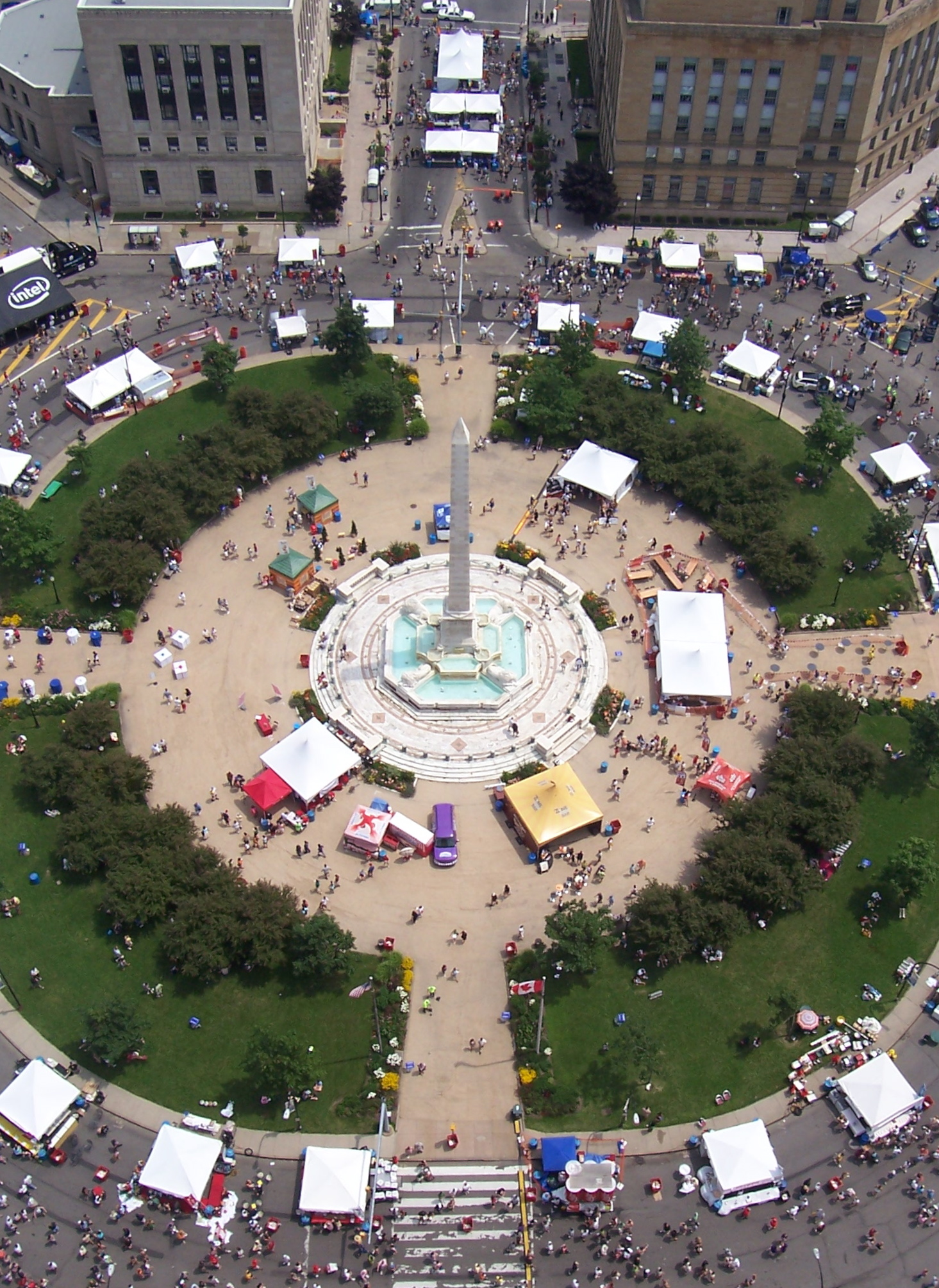
Niagara Square during the Taste of Buffalo in 2008

The architecture of Buffalo, New York, particularly the buildings constructed between the American Civil War and the Great Depression, is said to have created a new, distinctly American form of architecture and to have influenced design throughout the world.

== History ==
Buffalo's original plan from the early 19th century was loosely based on Pierre Charles L'Enfant's 1791 plan for Washington, an Americanized version of Paris's system of radiating boulevards. Buffalo's radial street grid was designed by Joseph Ellicott and complemented by a system of parks and parkways designed by Frederick Law Olmsted. Buffalo was the first city for which Olmsted designed an interconnected park and parkway system rather than stand-alone parks.

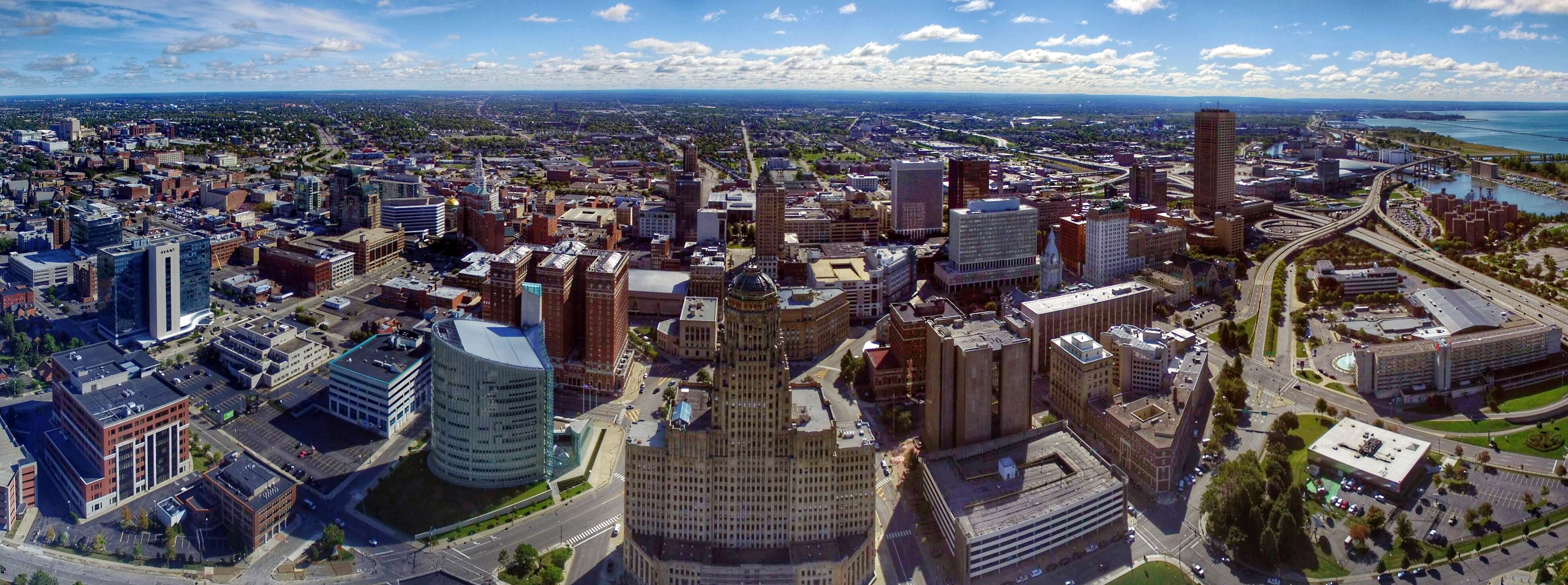
Aerial view of Buffalo's skyline. At center is the Robert H. Jackson United States Courthouse and the Art Deco Buffalo City Hall, with the Buffalo City Court Building to the right. On the far right is One Seneca Tower, formerly the HSBC Building.

During the Centennial Exposition of 1876 in Philadelphia, Pennsylvania, Frederick Law Olmsted declared Buffalo to be "the best planned city, as to its streets, public places, and grounds, in the United States, if not in the world."

According to The New York Times architecture writer Nicolai Ourousoff:

Buffalo was founded on a rich tradition of architectural experimentation. The architects who worked here were among the first to break with European traditions to create an aesthetic of their own, rooted in American ideals about individualism, commerce and social mobility.

The city contains buildings designed by American architecture masters like Frank Lloyd Wright, Louis Sullivan, and Henry Hobson Richardson, making Buffalo one of the most architecturally significant cities in America. It also contains many buildings designed by modern architects including Minoru Yamasaki, Toshiko Mori, Marcel Breuer and Harrison & Abramovitz.

=== Tallest buildings ===
Rank	Building	Height feet/meters	Floors	Year
1	Seneca One Tower	529 / 161	40	1972
2	Buffalo City Hall	398 / 121	32	1931
3	Rand Building	391 / 119	29	1929
4	Main Place Tower	350 / 107	26	1969
5	Liberty Building	345 / 105	23	1945
6	One M&T Plaza	317 / 97	21	1966
7	Electric Tower	294 / 90	14	1912
8	St. Paul's Cathedral	275 / 84	N/A	1851
9	50 Fountain Plaza	275 / 84	17	1990
10	Buffalo Central Terminal	271 / 83	20	1929

== Notable architects ==
Numerous architects and landscape architects have constructed landmark buildings and park systems of varying styles in Buffalo. They include:

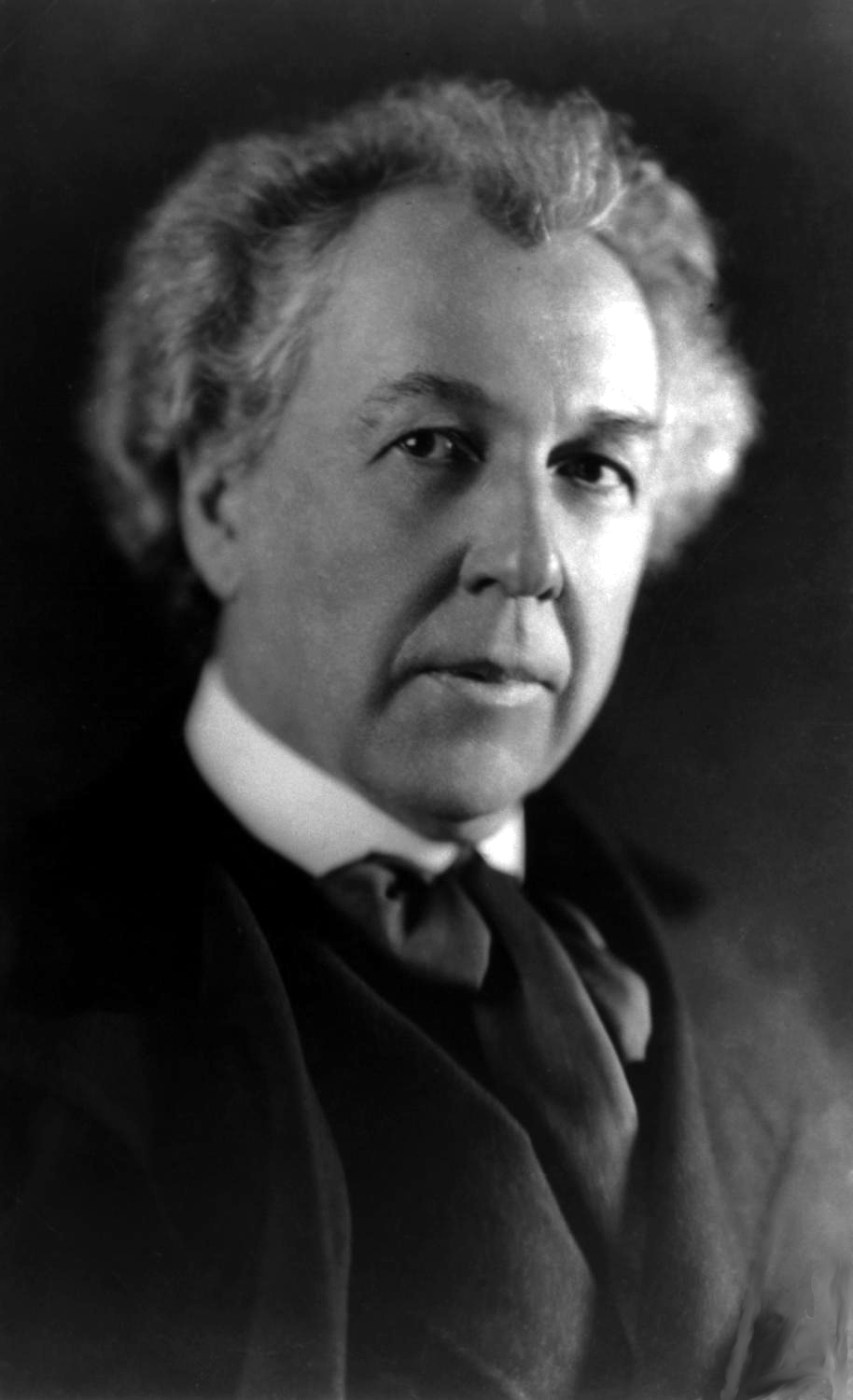
Frank Lloyd Wright, 1926

- Max Abramovitz
- Dankmar Adler
- Charles N. Agree
- Frederick C. Backus
- Milton Earl Beebe
- Louise Blanchard Bethune
- Alfred Bossom
- Gordon Bunshaft
- Daniel Burnham
- John E. Brent
- Robert T. Coles
- Marcel Breuer
- Carrère and Hastings
- George Cary (architect)
- Joseph Ellicott
- Cyrus L. W. Eidlitz
- James A. Johnson
- Esenwein & Johnson
- Philip M. Jullien
- Edward Brodhead Green
- Alfred T. Fellheimer
- Gwathmey Siegel & Associates Architects
- Wallace Harrison
- Albert Kahn
- Edward Austin Kent
- James William Kideney
- Kohn Pedersen Fox
- Lockwood, Greene & Co.
- Lord & Burnham
- Duane Lyman
- George Washington Maher
- McKim, Mead & White
- George Jacob Metzger
- Milton Milstein
- Toshiko Mori
- Robert North
- Frederick Law Olmsted
- George B. Post
- Cyrus Kinne Porter
- Cornelius Ward Rapp
- George Leslie Rapp
- Henry Hobson Richardson
- Paul Marvin Rudolph
- Eliel Saarinen
- Eero Saarinen
- Ellen Biddle Shipman
- Joseph Lyman Silsbee
- Edward Durell Stone
- Louis Sullivan
- Skidmore, Owings & Merrill
- Max Toltz
- Richard Upjohn
- Calvert Vaux
- Stanford White
- Frank Lloyd Wright
- Minoru Yamasaki

== Landmarks, monuments and public places ==
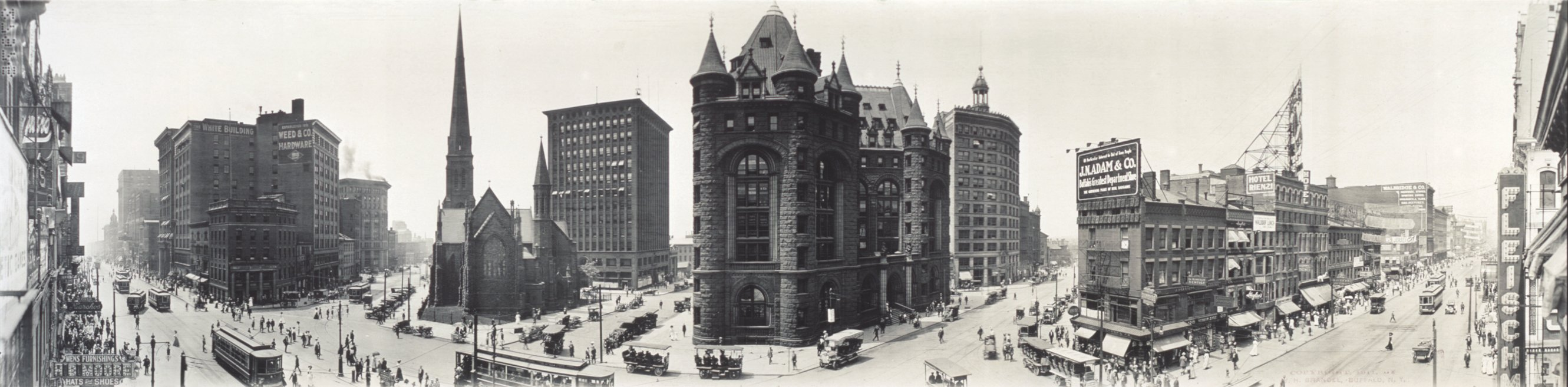
Panorama view of Buffalo in 1911, with the Guaranty Building (Buffalo, New York) left of middle

=== Albright–Knox Art Gallery ===
The Albright–Knox Art Gallery was designed in 1890 architect Edward Brodhead Green and funded by Buffalo entrepreneur and philanthropist, John J. Albright, a wealthy Buffalo industrialist. It was originally intended to be used as the Fine Arts Pavilion for the Pan-American Exposition in 1901, but delays in its construction caused it to remain uncompleted until 1905. In 1962, a new addition was made to the gallery through the contributions of Seymour H. Knox II and his family, and many other donors. At this time the museum was renamed the Albright–Knox Art Gallery. The new building was designed by Skidmore, Owings and Merrill architect Gordon Bunshaft, who is noted for the Lever House in New York City. The Albright–Knox Art Gallery is listed in the National Register of Historic Places.

=== Buffalo Central Terminal ===
The Buffalo Central Terminal is a 17-story Art Deco style station designed by architects Fellheimer & Wagner and built in 1929 for the New York Central Railroad. The terminal "was built to handle over 200 trains and 10,000 passengers daily, as well as 1,500 New York Central employees. It included shops, a restaurant, soda fountain, parking garage and all other services required for daily passenger operations." It was added to the National Register of Historic Places on September 7, 1984.

=== Buffalo City Court Building ===
The Buffalo City Court Building is named Frank A. Sedita City Court (for Buffalo mayor Frank A. Sedita), and designed by Pfohl, Roberts and Biggie. It is a 10-story court house built in 1974 and located in Niagara Square and adjacent to Buffalo City Hall. The structure is a classic example of Brutalist architecture; its façade is dominated by large Precast concrete panels with narrow windows. The design was conceived with limited windows in order to keep the courtrooms and judges' chambers free from outside distraction.

=== Buffalo City Hall ===
Buffalo City Hall is a 32-story Art Deco building and was completed in 1931 by Dietel, Wade & Jones. Its walls are faced with Ohio sandstone and gray Minnesota limestone, above a base of gray granite. The exterior and interior are adorned with symbolic figures and decorations representing Buffalo's history, including the Iroquois Indians, the steel industry, law and education, electrical energy, and the waterfront community. In the lobby, there are four statues, "each which represent the characteristic of good citizenship, Virtue, Diligence, Service, and Fidelity." It was added to the National Register of Historic Places on January 15, 1999.

=== Buffalo History Museum ===
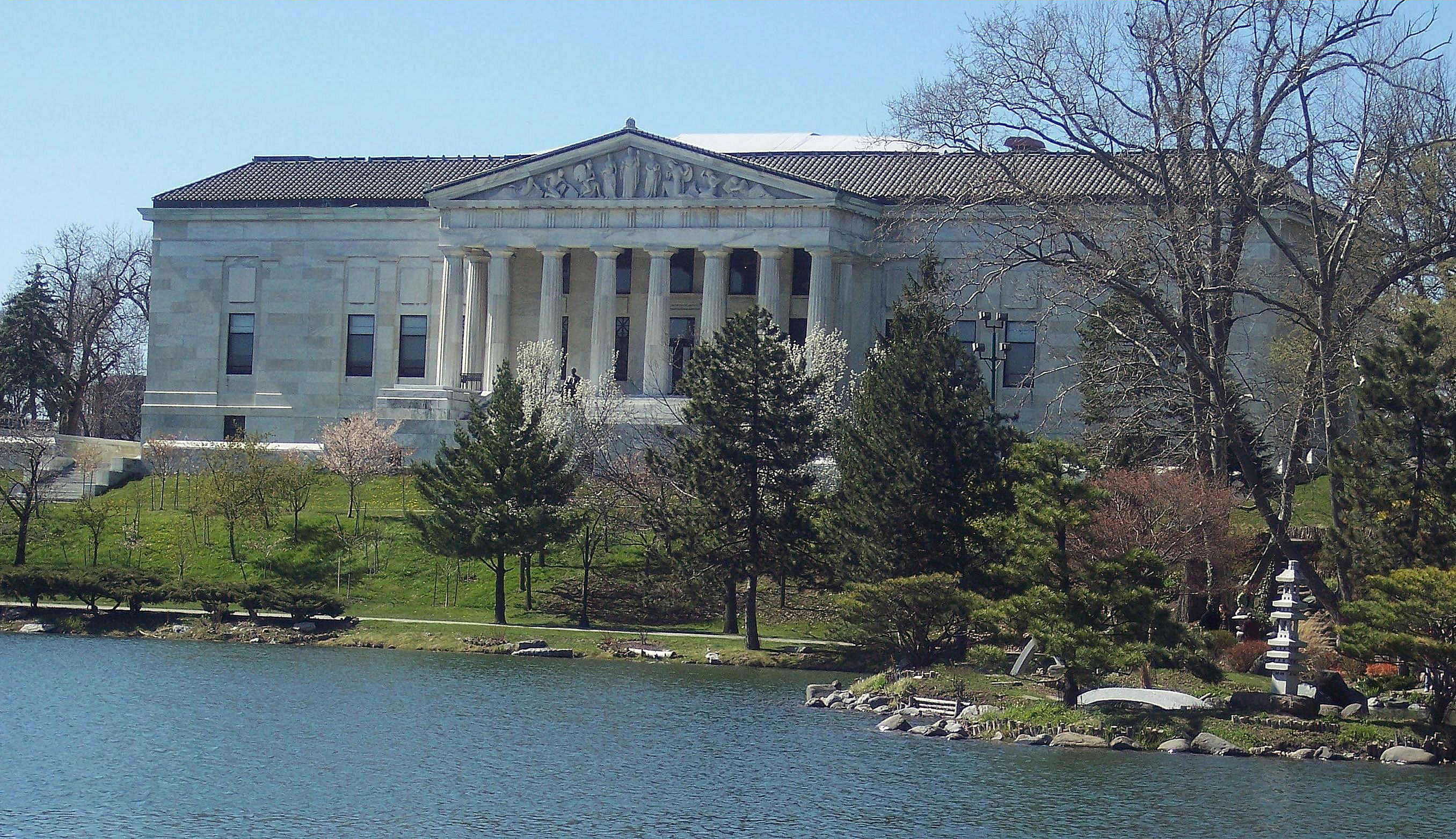
Buffalo History Museum

The Buffalo History Museum was constructed in 1901 as the New York State pavilion for the Pan-American Exposition of 1901 and is the sole surviving permanent structure from the exposition. It was added to the National Register of Historic Places on April 23, 1980, and designated a National Historic Landmark on February 27, 1987.

=== Buffalo Main Light ===
The Buffalo Main Light, also known as The Buffalo Lighthouse, is Buffalo's oldest building. It was built in 1833 and deactivated in 1914. It appears on the city seal at the mouth of the Buffalo River. It is also one of the oldest lighthouses on the Great Lakes. The walls of the tapered, unpainted octagonal limestone tower are four feet thick at the base and rise to 44 feet in height. The foundation material was stone molehead and the lighthouse was constructed out of limestone and cast iron. The shape of the tower was octagonal and was 60 feet (18 m) high. The lens installed in 1857 was a third order Fresnel lens. It was listed on the National Register of Historic Places in 1984.

=== Delaware Park System ===
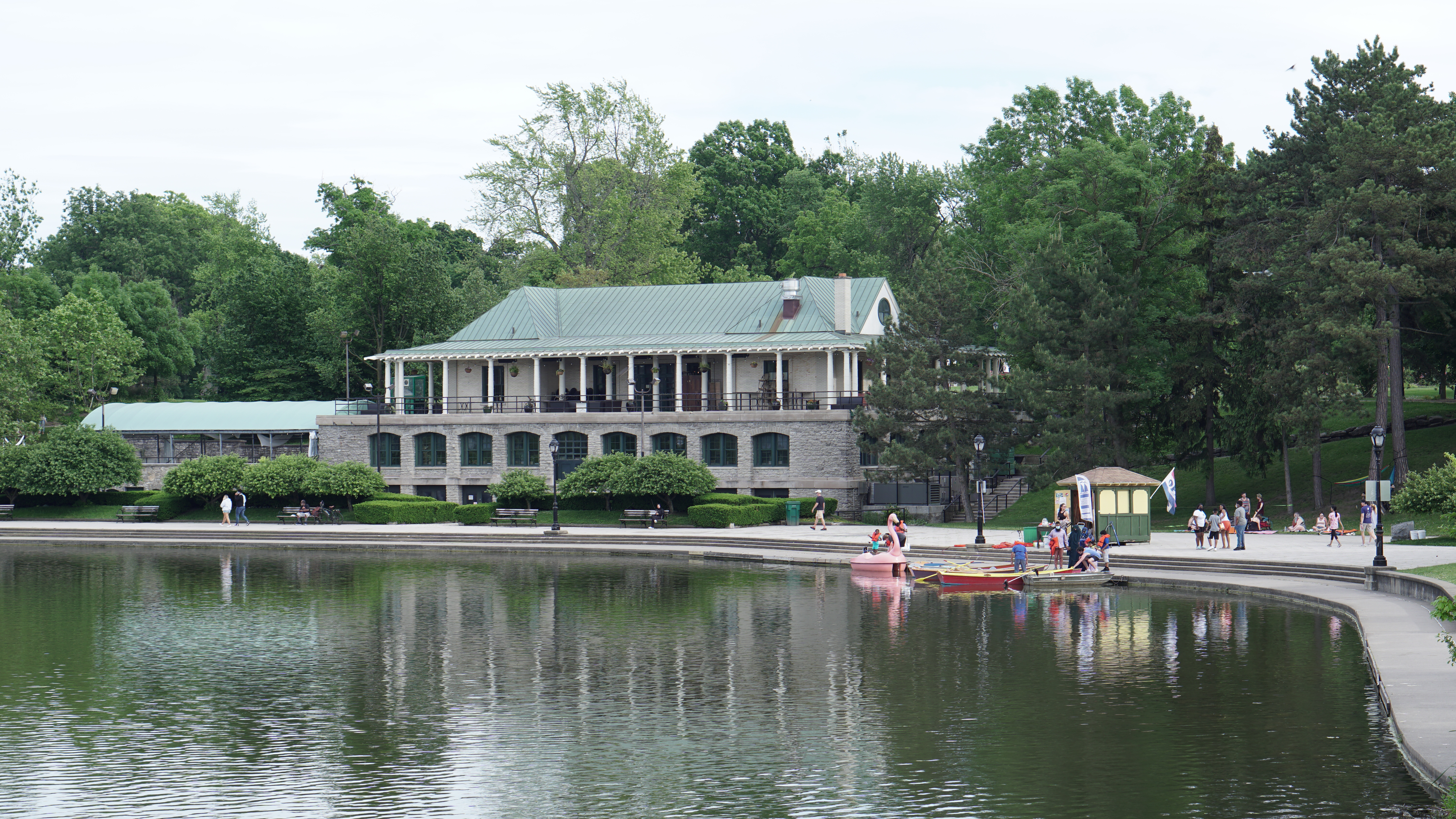
Delaware Park Casino

The Delaware Park System is a historic park system and national historic district located in the northern and western sections of Buffalo. The park system was designed by Frederick Law Olmsted and Calvert Vaux and developed between 1868 and 1876. The Park System comprises many parks, Delaware Park being the largest (encompassing 376 acres). There are also Gates Circle, Chapin Parkway, Soldier's Place, Lincoln Parkway, Bidwell Parkway, and Front Park, among others. The park system was listed on the National Register of Historic Places in 1982.

=== Larkin Administration Building ===
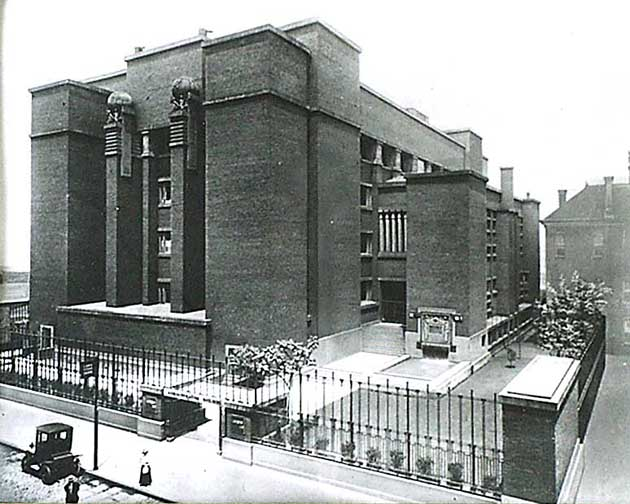
Larkin Administration Building, 1906

The Larkin Administration Building was Frank Lloyd Wright's first commission in Buffalo. Larkin executive Darwin D. Martin hired Wright to design a building that would house the large number of clerks needed to operate the mail-order business for the Larkin Soap Company. Because the building would be located in an industrial part of town, it was necessary to make the building as attractive as possible to women, who made up the bulk of the white collar work force.

The Larkin Building was Wright's first commercial commission and he designed not just the building, but also the furniture, light fixtures and the china for the workers' cafeteria. Where possible, files and furniture were built into the structure, and he created desks with attached chairs that could swivel to save room. Wright included a pipe organ for lunchtime entertainment, a lending library and a conservatory to allow employees to rest and commune with nature. The Larkin Building is significant for its comprehensive design, where every element performed a specific task, as well as being the first modern office building that separated blue-collar and white-collar workers.

The Larkin Company went out of business in 1937, and the building was sold. Eventually, the City of Buffalo took it over for back taxes planning to demolish it for a trucking plaza. Despite community outcry, the building was torn down in 1950.

=== Old Post Office ===
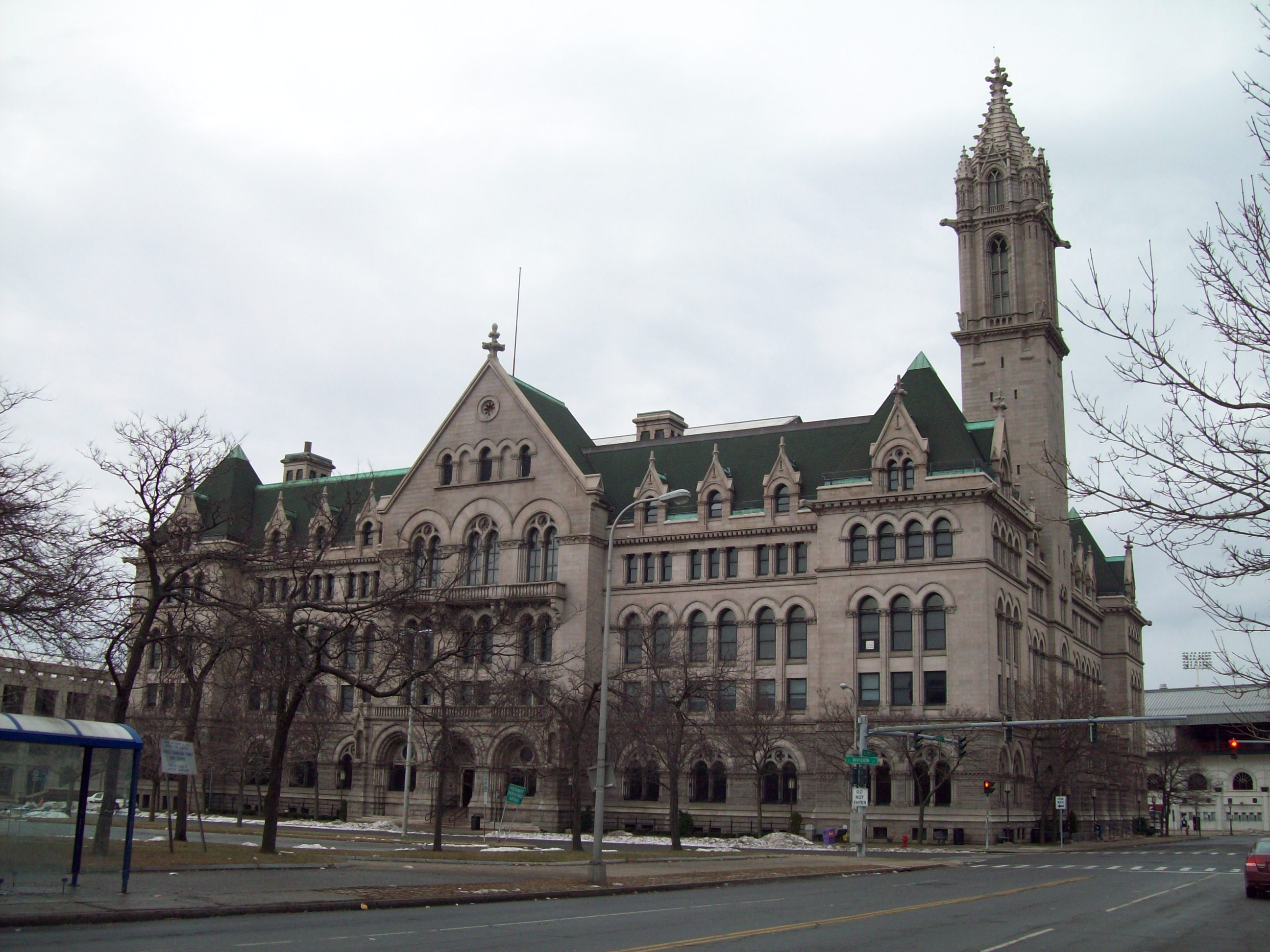
Old Post Office, 2009

The Old Post Office is a historic post office building located at 121 Ellicott Street in Buffalo in Erie County, New York. It was designed by the then Office of the Supervising Architect, Jeremiah O'Rourke, when construction started in 1897. The $1.5 million (equivalent to $58,050,000 in 2025) building opened in 1901 during the tenure of James Knox Taylor and operated as Buffalo's central post office until 1963 and was the tallest building in the city from 1901 to 1912. The highly ornamented Gothic Revival style four-story building features a 244-foot tower over the central entrance and a roofed courtyard. It was subsequently occupied by federal offices. Since 1981, it has been home to the city campus of Erie Community College. Its tower is 74.4 meters tall.

=== Prudential (Guaranty) Building ===
The Guaranty Building (Buffalo, New York) was completed in 1896 and was designed by Chicago architects Louis Sullivan and Dankmar Adler. It remains one of the first skyscrapers ever built with a steel structure and is embellished with terra cotta blocks. It was added to the National Register of Historic Places on March 20, 1973, and designated a National Historic Landmark on May 15, 1975.

=== Richardson Olmsted Complex ===
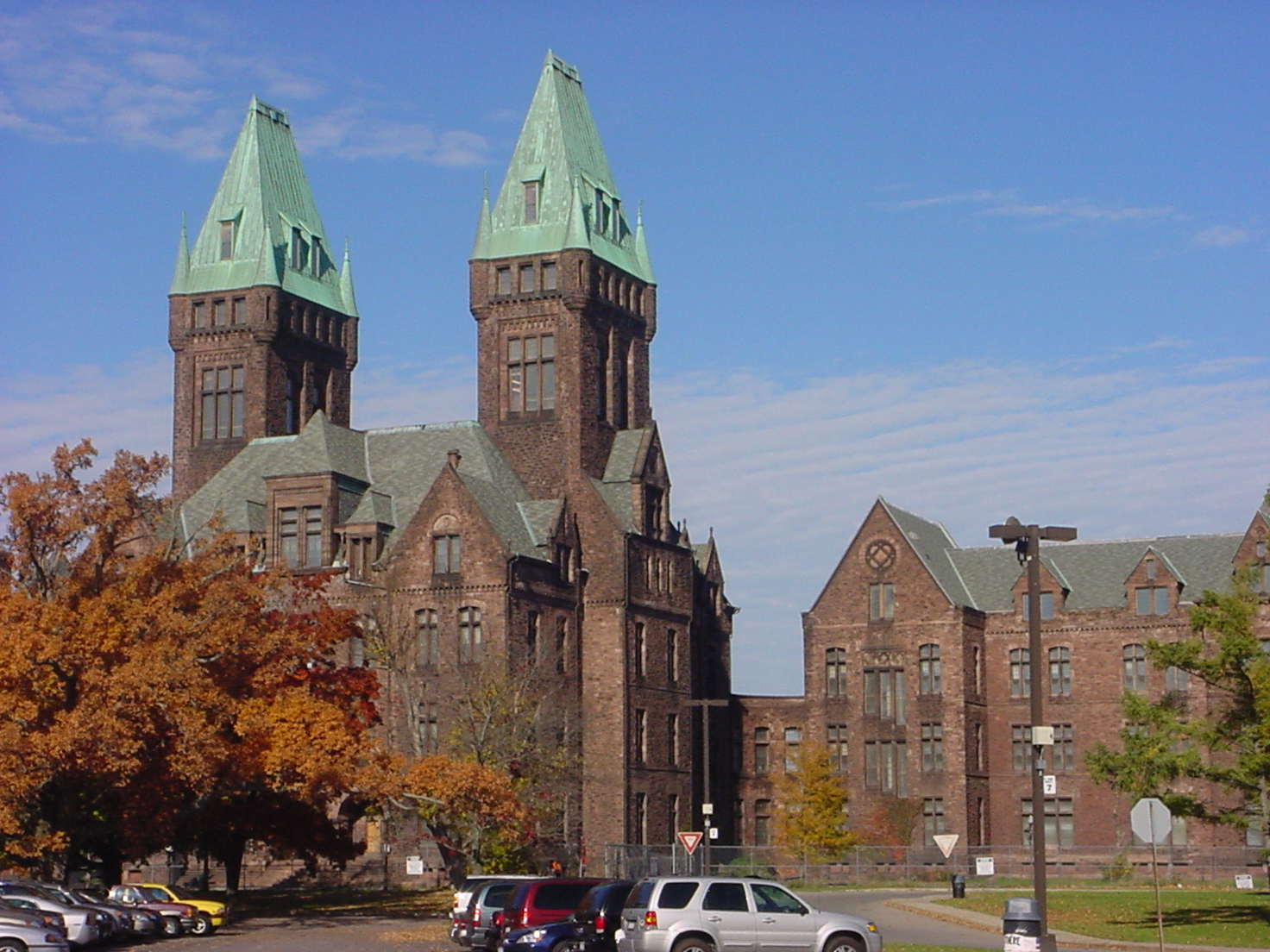
Richardson Olmsted Complex, 2009

The Richardson Olmsted Complex is a grouping of Medina red sandstone and brick hospital buildings designed in 1870 in the Kirkbride Plan by architect Henry Hobson Richardson with grounds by landscape architect Frederick Law Olmsted. The complex was the largest commission of Richardson's career and marks the beginning of his characteristic "Romanesque Revival" style known as "Richardsonian Romanesque." It was added to the National Register of Historic Places on January 12, 1973, and designated a National Historic Landmark on June 24, 1986.

=== Sculptures and monuments ===
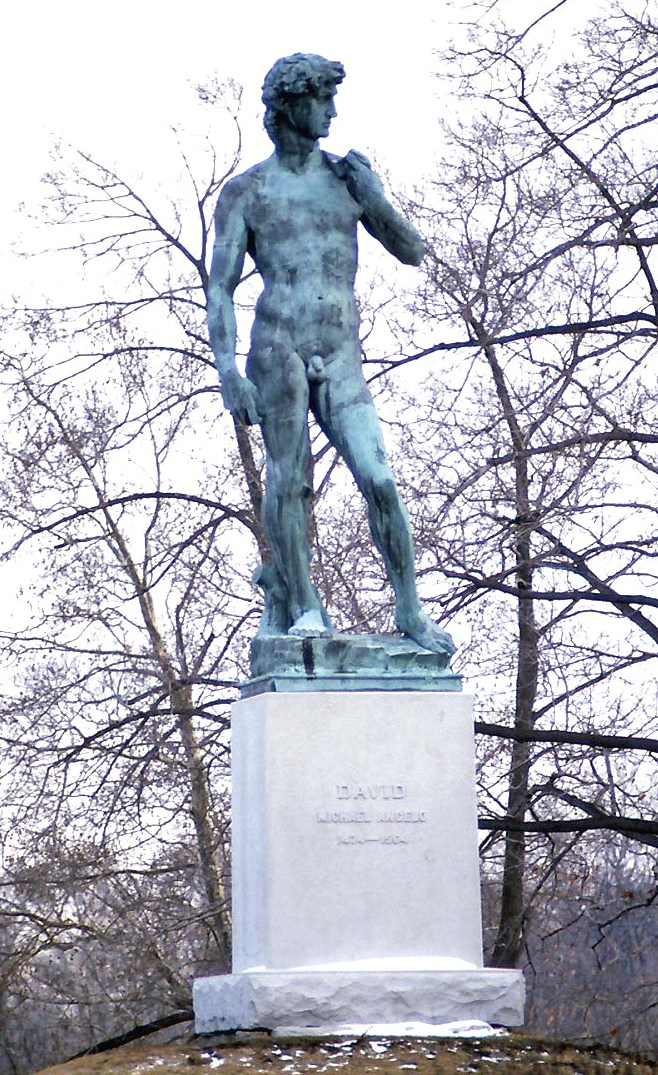
Michelangelo's David, 2009

There are several sculptures and monuments located throughout the city, including:

- Michelangelo's David by Angelus and Sons (founder)
- Soldiers and Sailors Monument (Civil War Monument) by Caspar Bubert (Sculptor), George W. Keller (Architect), M. J. Powers (Founder)
- McKinley Monument by Alexander Phimister Proctor (Sculptor), Newman & Evans (Sculptor), Carrère and Hastings (Architect)
- Wolfgang A. Mozart by Olin H. Warner (Sculptor), Bureau Brothers Foundry (Founder)
- Alexander Petofi (Sandor Petofi) by Geza Kende (Sculptor; Original Bust), Gabriella F. Koszorus-Varsa (Sculptor; New Bust), Frank A. Spangenberg (Sculptor; Base)
- John F. Kennedy bust by Bryant Baker
- Giuseppe Verdi by Antonio Ugo (Sculptor), A. Decianno (Sculptor)
- Frederic Chopin by Jozef Mazur
- Frank X. Schwab by C. Sorgi
- Indian Hunter by John Quincy Adams Ward
- General Daniel Davidson Bidwell by Sahl Swarz
- Commodore Oliver Hazard Perry by Charles Henry Niehaus

== Residential ==
=== Birge-Horton House ===
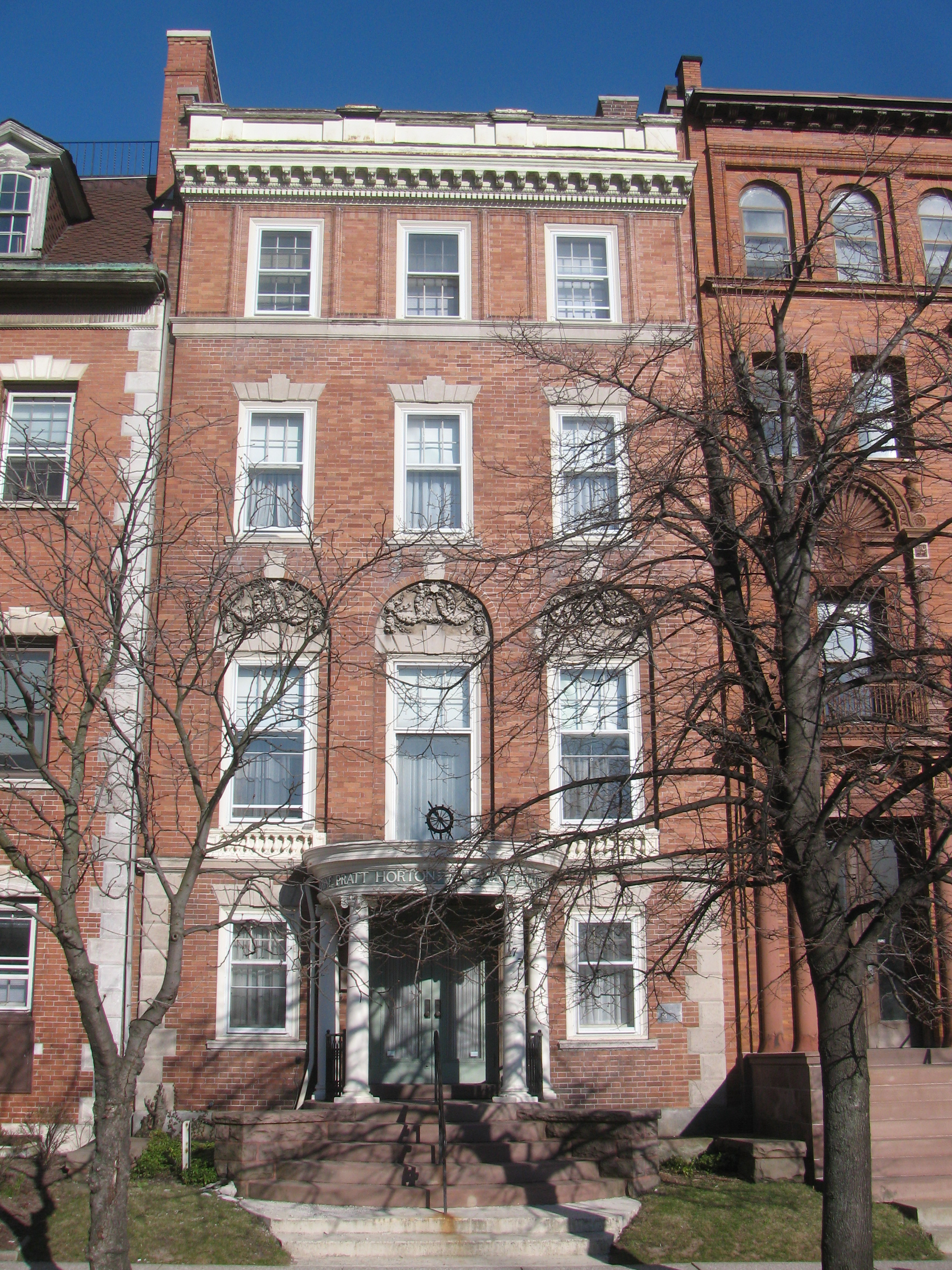
Birge-Horton House, 2009

The Birge-Horton House was designed in 1895 by the Buffalo architectural firm of Green and Wicks and is a Georgian Revival style row house in "The Midway" section of Delaware Avenue. It is a four-story brick house with stone trim. The house is situated within the boundaries of the Allentown Historic District. The Birge-Horton House was the last of the thirteen luxury row houses built from 1893–1895. All were four-story houses, and each house is the work of varying architects and of different designs; however, they give an overall appearance of unified composition because of similarities in height, width, and construction materials.

=== Charles W. Goodyear House ===
The Charles W. Goodyear House was designed by Buffalo architect Edward Green, of the Buffalo architecture firm Green & Wicks, and was completed in 1903 at a cost of $500,000 (equivalent to $17,917,000 in 2025). The home was built for Charles and Ella Goodyear. The house is located in the Delaware Avenue Historic District, a federally designated historic district listed on the National Register of Historic Places since 1974. The exterior of the 2 1/2-story house is brick trimmed with stone. The mansard roof includes a row of dormers with pedimented tops with a festooned motif that runs along the roofline above a dentilled cornice. The principal entrance is on the north (right) side of the house denoted by a large arched doorway, bordered on each side by stone urns. The east façade facing Delaware Avenue has a one-story porch with columns, that was later bricked in.

=== Darwin D. Martin House ===
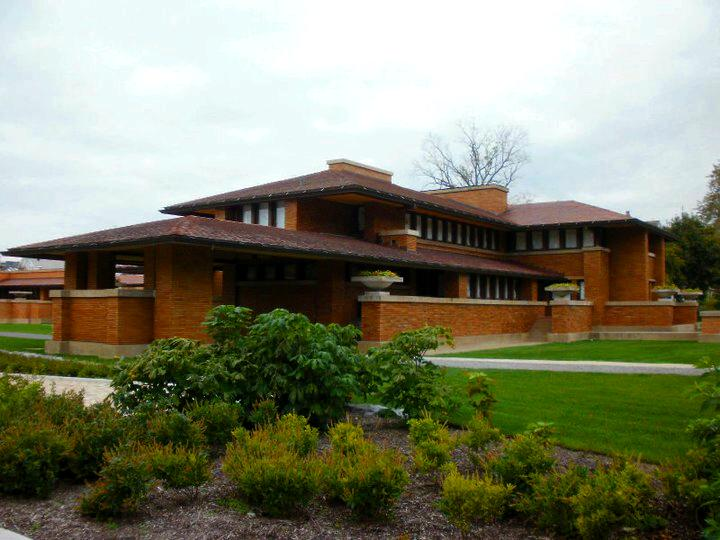
Darwin D. Martin House, 2012

The Darwin D. Martin House was designed by Frank Lloyd Wright and built between 1903 and 1905 for Darwin D. Martin, an executive of the Larkin Soap Company. Martin chose Wright to design his own house because he was so impressed with Wright and his design for the Larkin Administration Building. The Martin House is considered to be one of the most important projects from Wright's Prairie School era. Compared to other Prairie Houses, the Martin House is unusually large and has an open plan containing 15 distinctive patterns of nearly 400 art glass windows, designed by Wright, some of which contain over 750 individual pieces of iridescent glass, that act as light screens to connect exterior views to the spaces within. More patterns of art glass were designed for the house than for any other of Wright's Prairie Houses. It was added to the National Register of Historic Places on February 24, 1986, and designated a National Historic Landmark, also on February 24, 1986.

=== Theodore Roosevelt Inaugural National Historic Site ===
The Theodore Roosevelt Inaugural National Historic Site, also known as the Ansley Wilcox House, at 641 Delaware Avenue was built in 1840 by George Cary (U.S. Army) originally intended as the Barrack's officer's quarters. After the post was disbanded in 1845, the home reverted to a private residence. Subsequent owners continued to modify the structure adding and demolishing out structures and additions. In the late 19th century, Dexter Rumsey gave the property to his son-in-law Ansley Wilcox and his wife Mary Grace Rumsey. The newest inhabitants made extensive renovations to the structure.

In 1901, while attending the Pan-American Exposition, anarchist Leon Czolgosz shot President William McKinley. Vice-President Theodore Roosevelt rushed back to Buffalo, but arrived only after McKinley had died. Due to the tragic and politically charged circumstances of the President's death, the inauguration was held immediately, and the most appropriate site was determined to be the Wilcox home. Approximately 50 dignitaries, family members and cabinet officials gathered in the front library for the inauguration and Federal Judge John R. Hazel administered the oath. The Wilcoxes continued to live in the home until their deaths in the 1930s. The National Historic Site was authorized on November 2, 1966. As a historic area administered by the National Park Service, it was automatically listed on the National Register of Historic Places the same day.

=== William Dorsheimer House ===
The William Dorsheimer House was designed and built in 1868 by Henry Hobson Richardson (1838–1886) for William Dorsheimer (1832–1888), a prominent local lawyer and Lieutenant Governor of New York. It is located on Delaware Avenue in Buffalo and is a 2 1/2-story brick dwelling. It represents the profound influence of French ideas on the arts in the post Civil War period. It was listed on the National Register of Historic Places in 1980.

=== William R. Heath House ===
The William R. Heath House was designed by Frank Lloyd Wright, built in 1904–1905, and is located at 76 Soldiers Place in Buffalo, New York. It is built in the Prairie School architectural style. William Heath was a lawyer who served as office manager, and eventually vice-president, of the Larkin Company in Buffalo. Heath's wife Mary was a sister of Elbert Hubbard, a former Larkin executive. The property was a deep and narrow corner lot, facing a large traffic circle. This presented Wright with the problem of situating a substantial Prairie house, with its characteristically open structure, in a confined space with twice the street exposure. The house was placed with its long axis right up against the Bird Ave. sidewalk with sections of the traffic circle acting as the grounds that a house of this standing would normally possess.

== Gallery ==
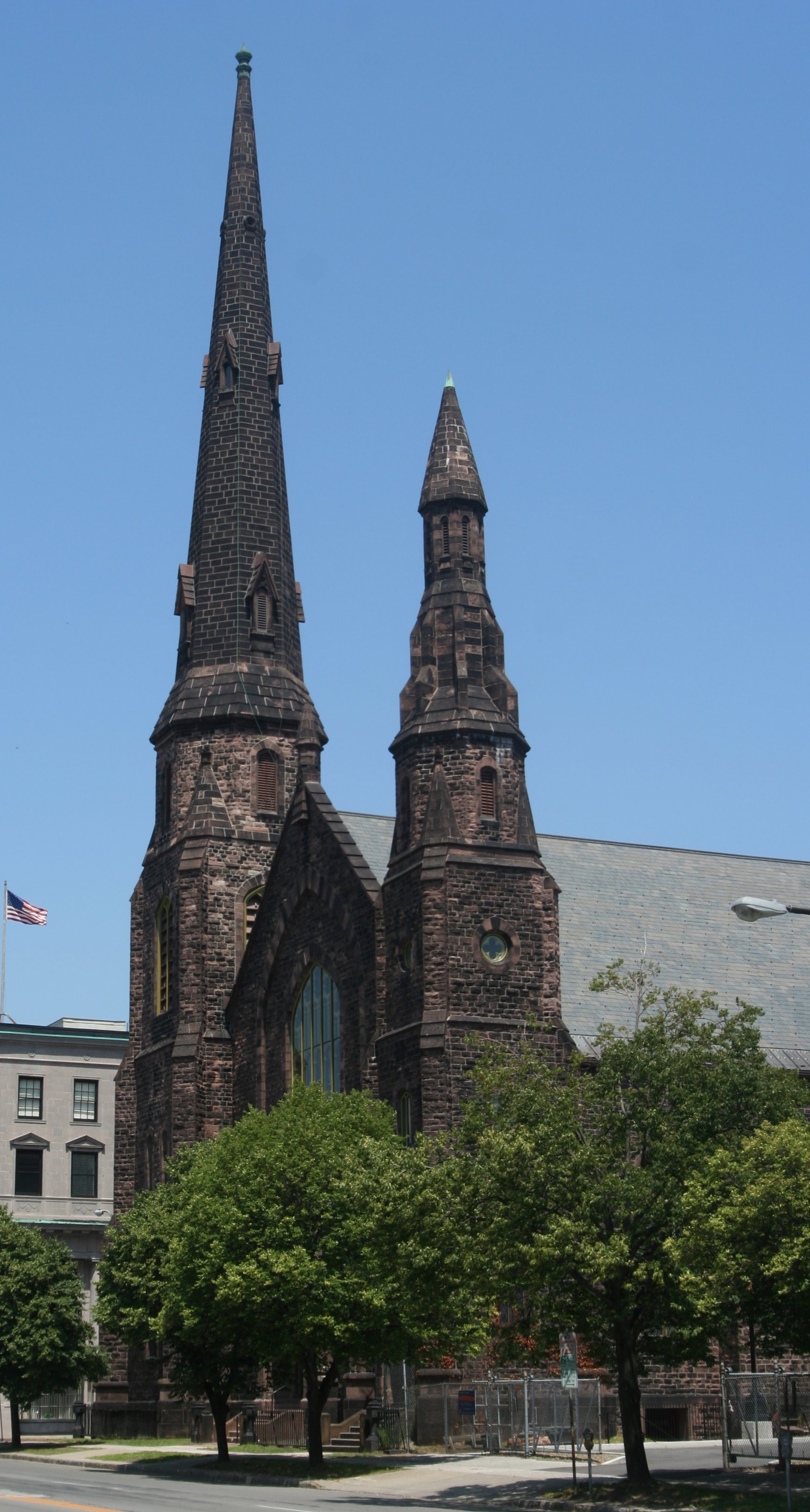
Asbury Delaware Church

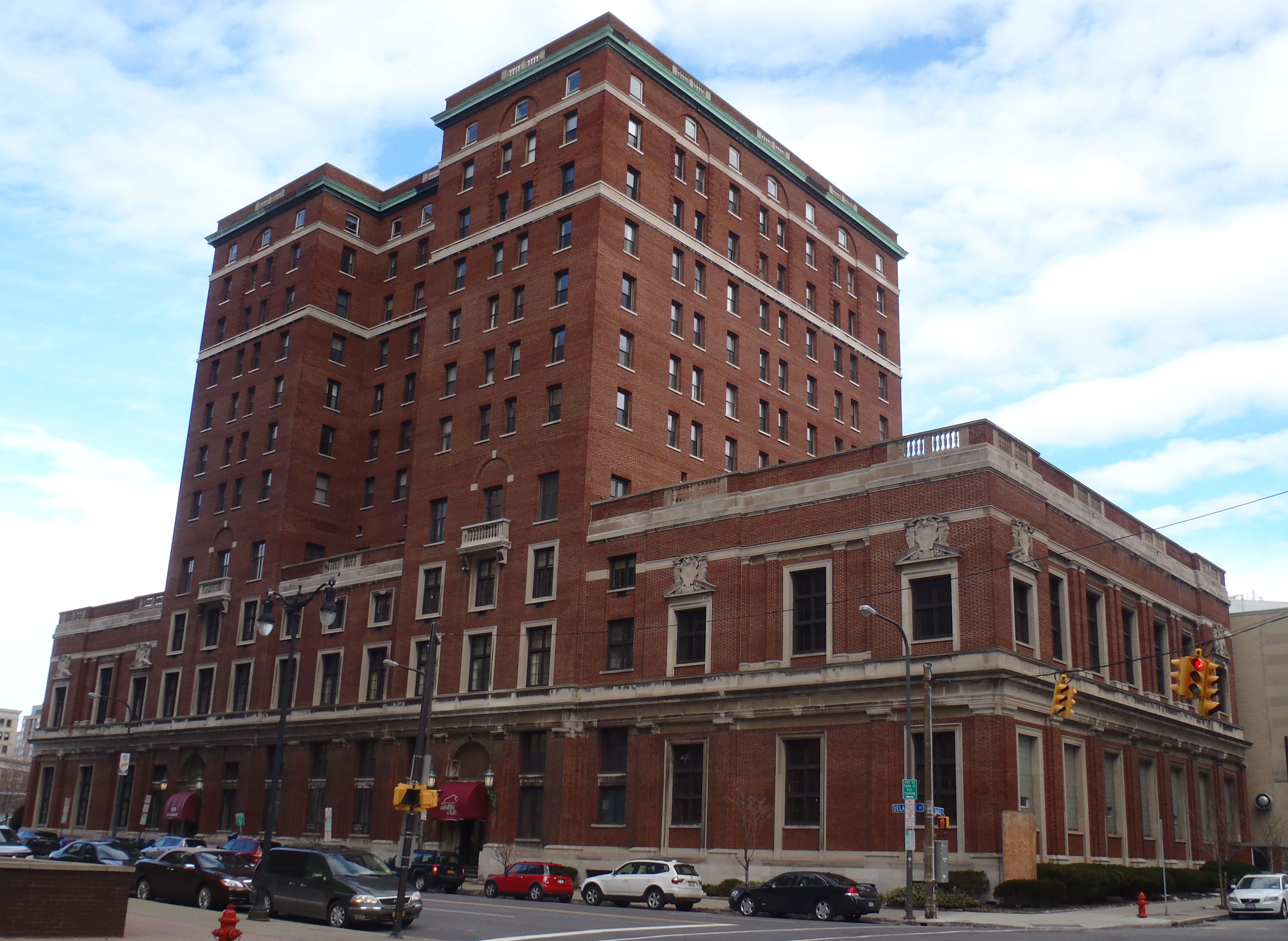
Buffalo Athletic Club

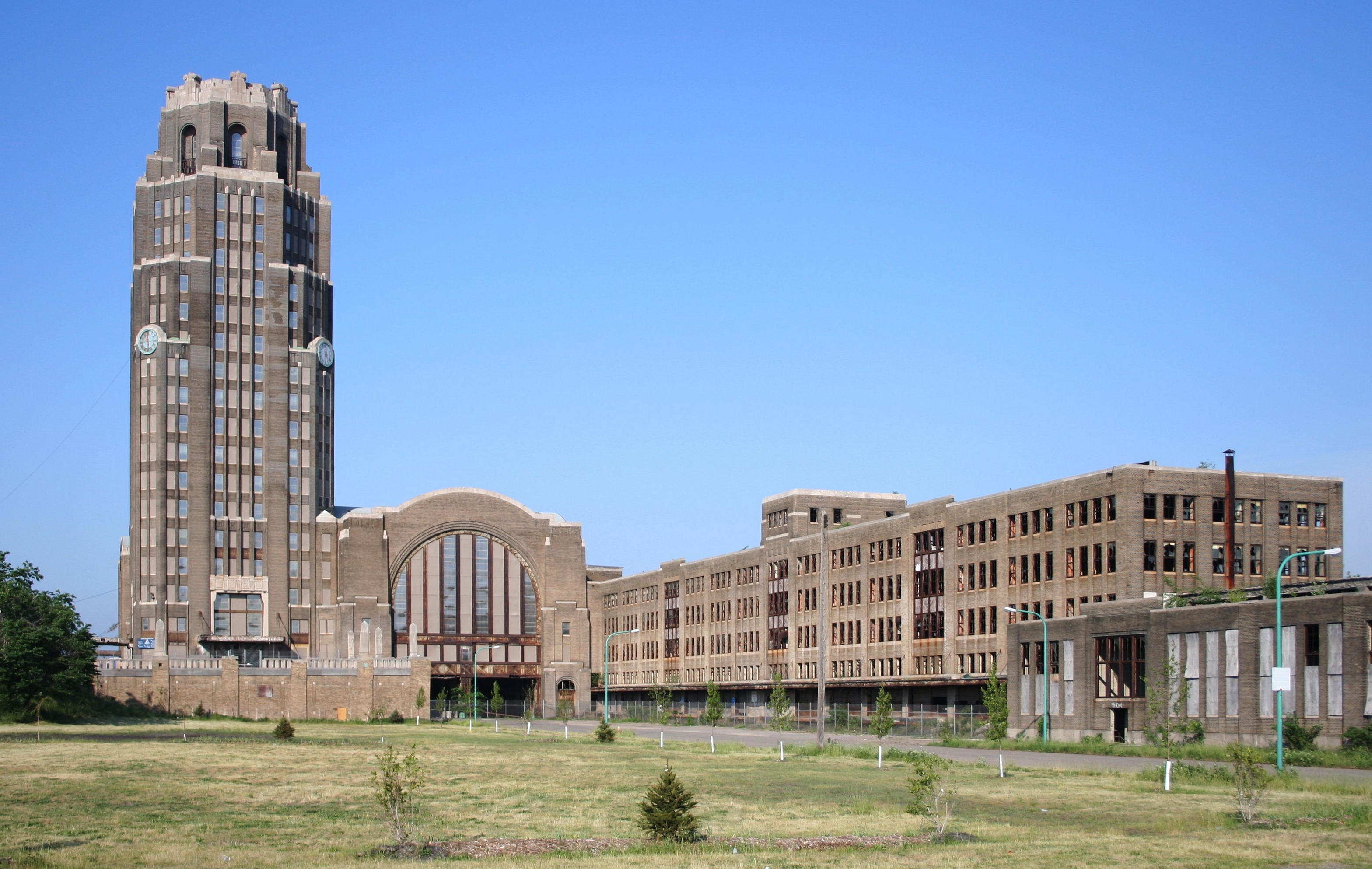
Buffalo Central Terminal

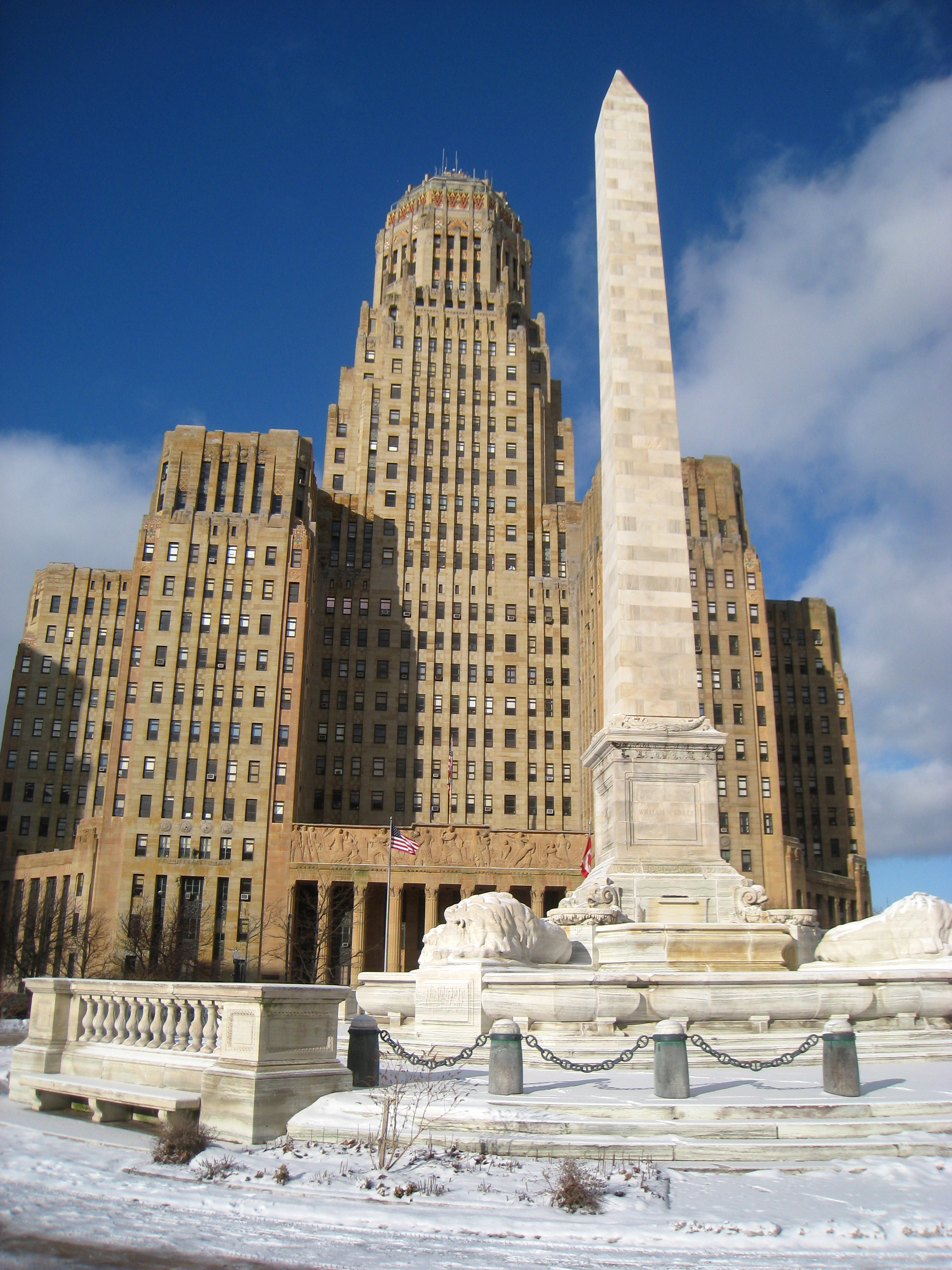
Buffalo City Hall

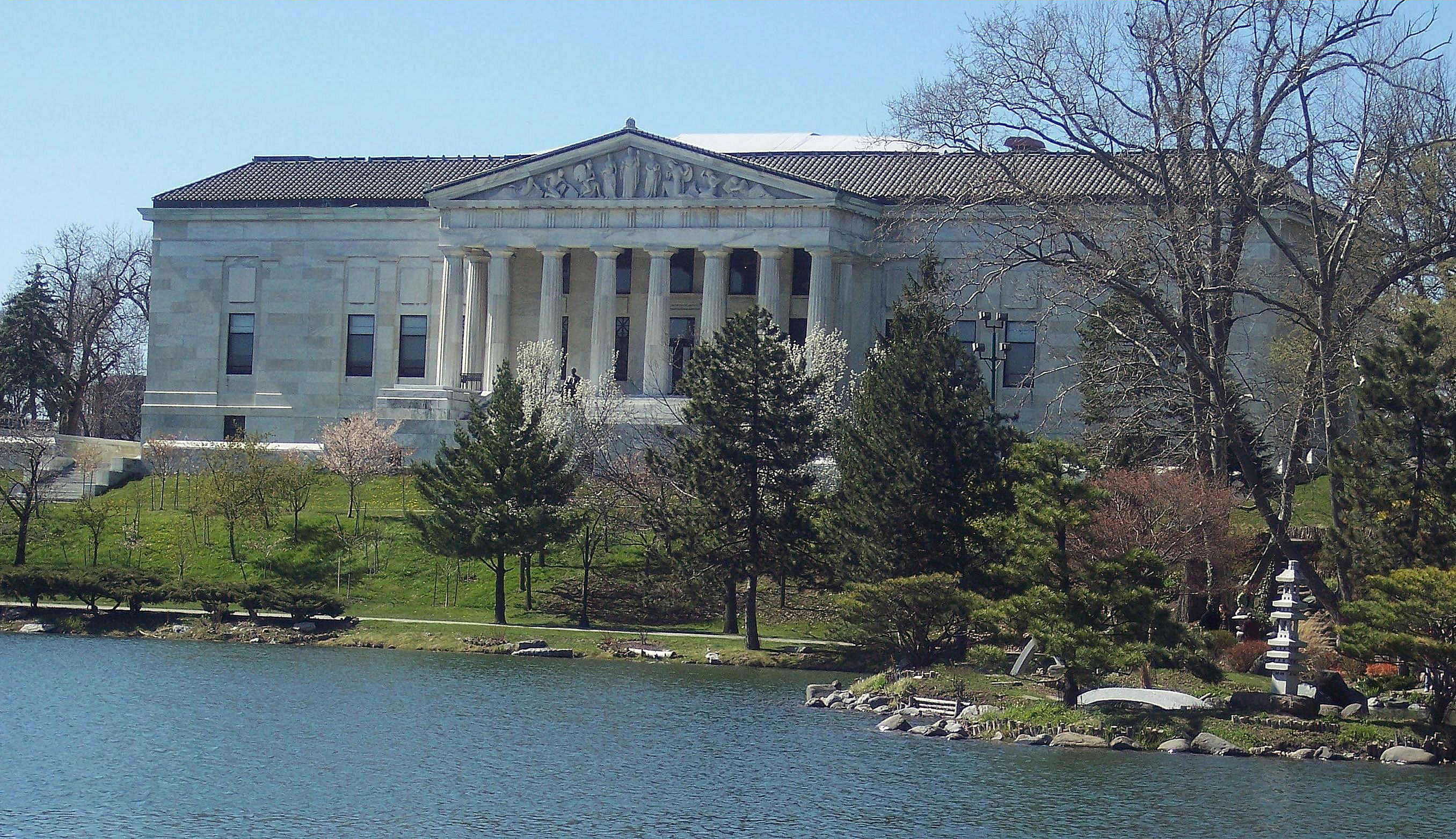
Buffalo History Museum

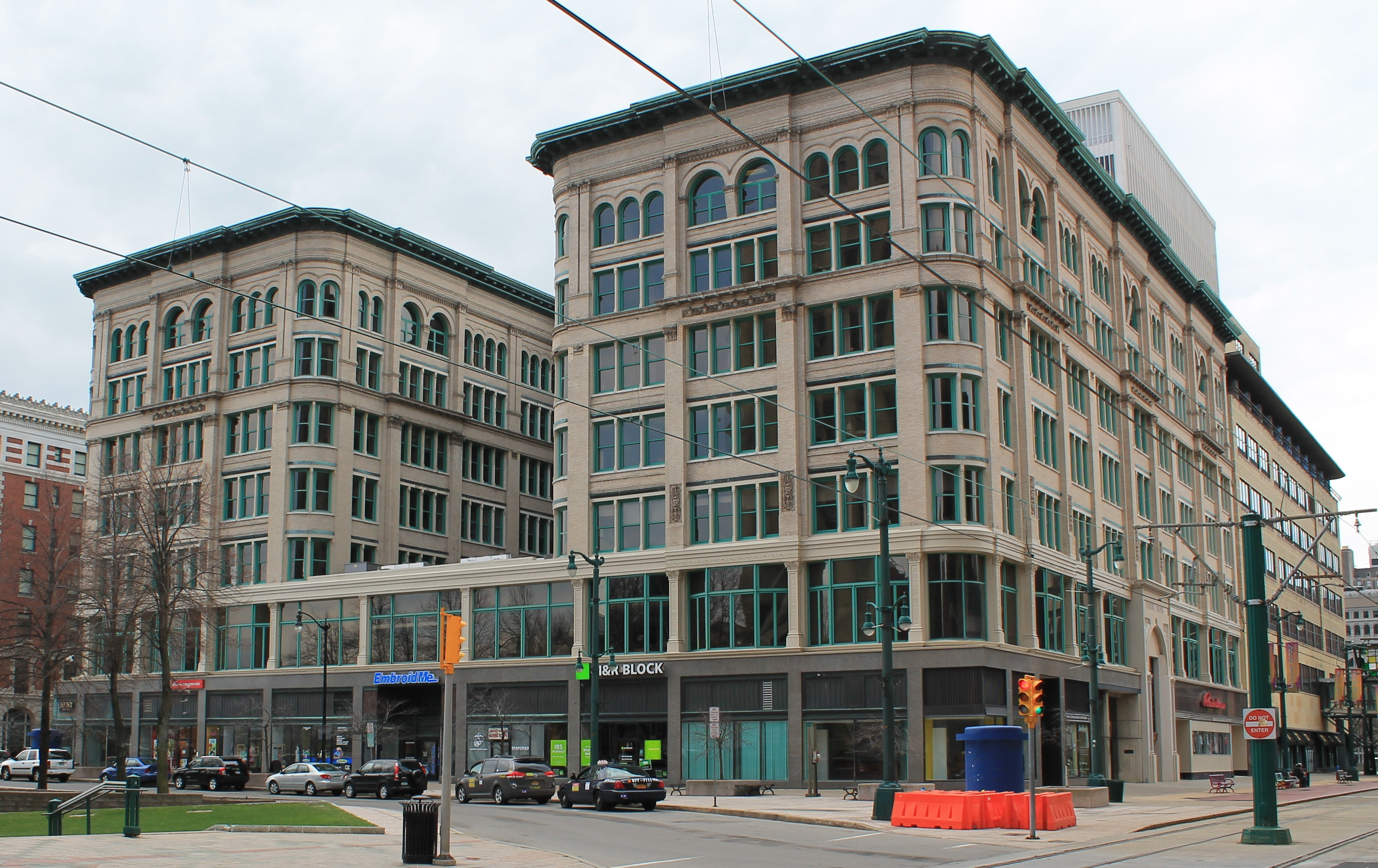
Brisbane Building

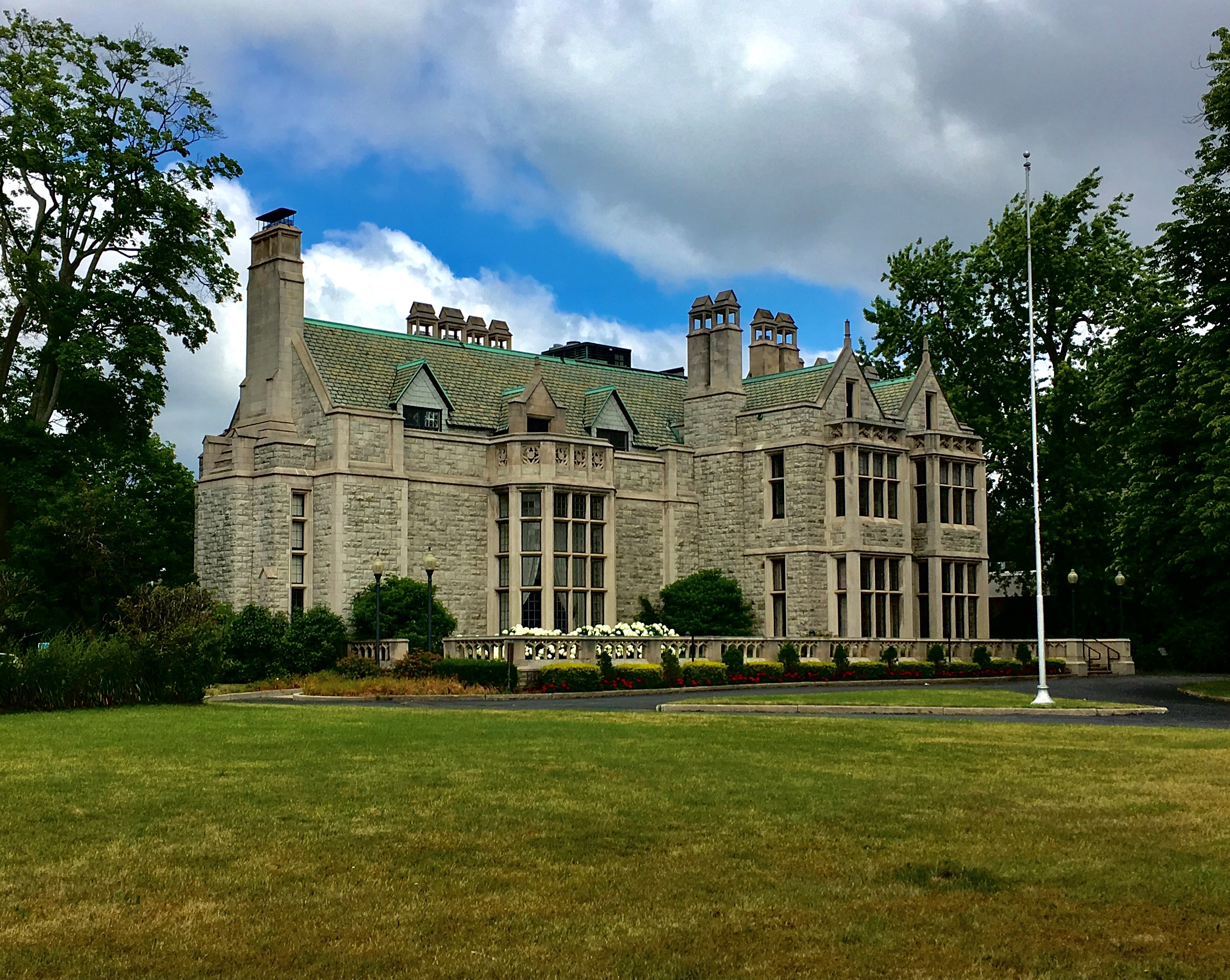
The Clement House by Edward Brodhead Green

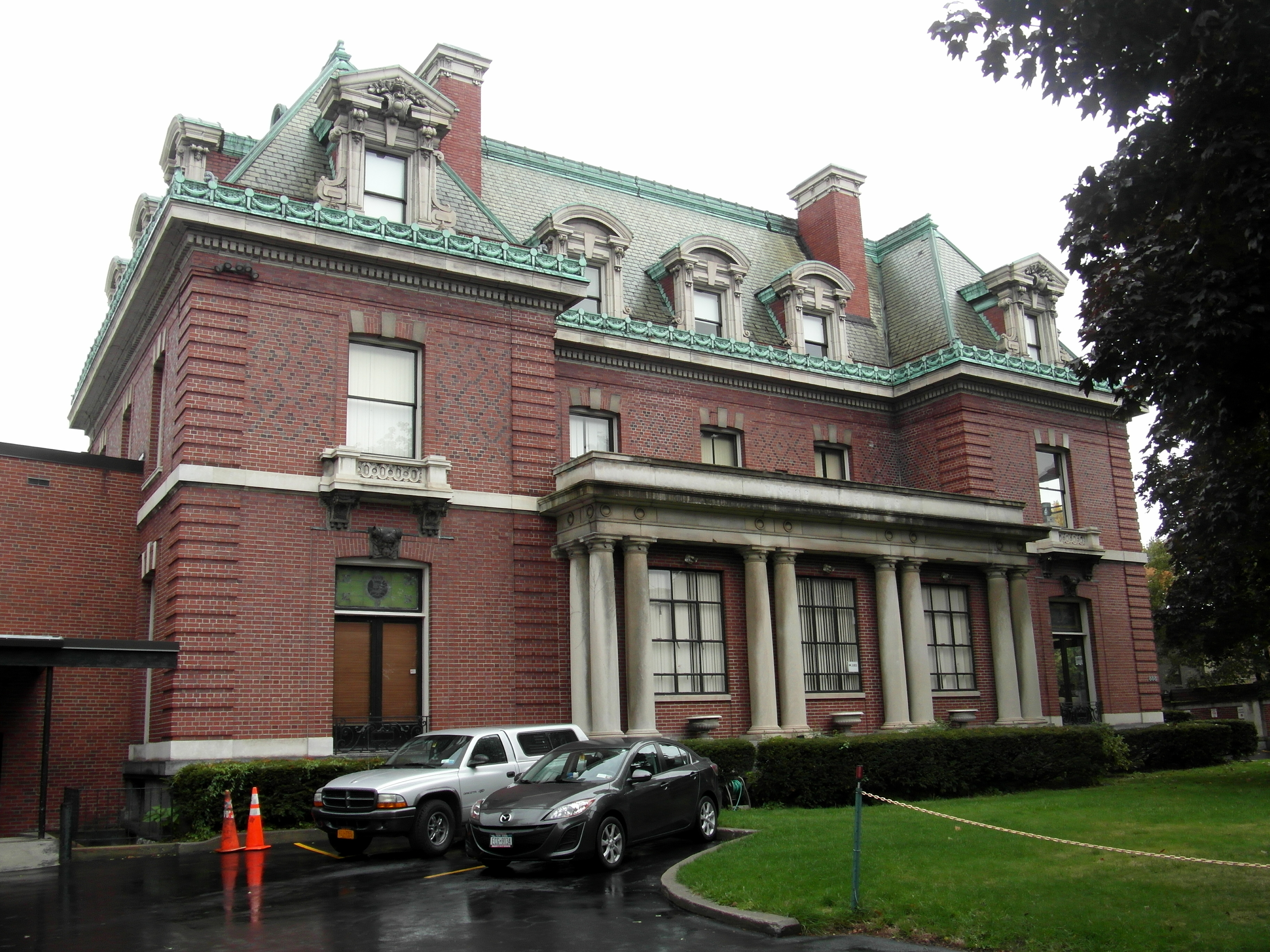
Charles W. Goodyear House by Edward Brodhead Green

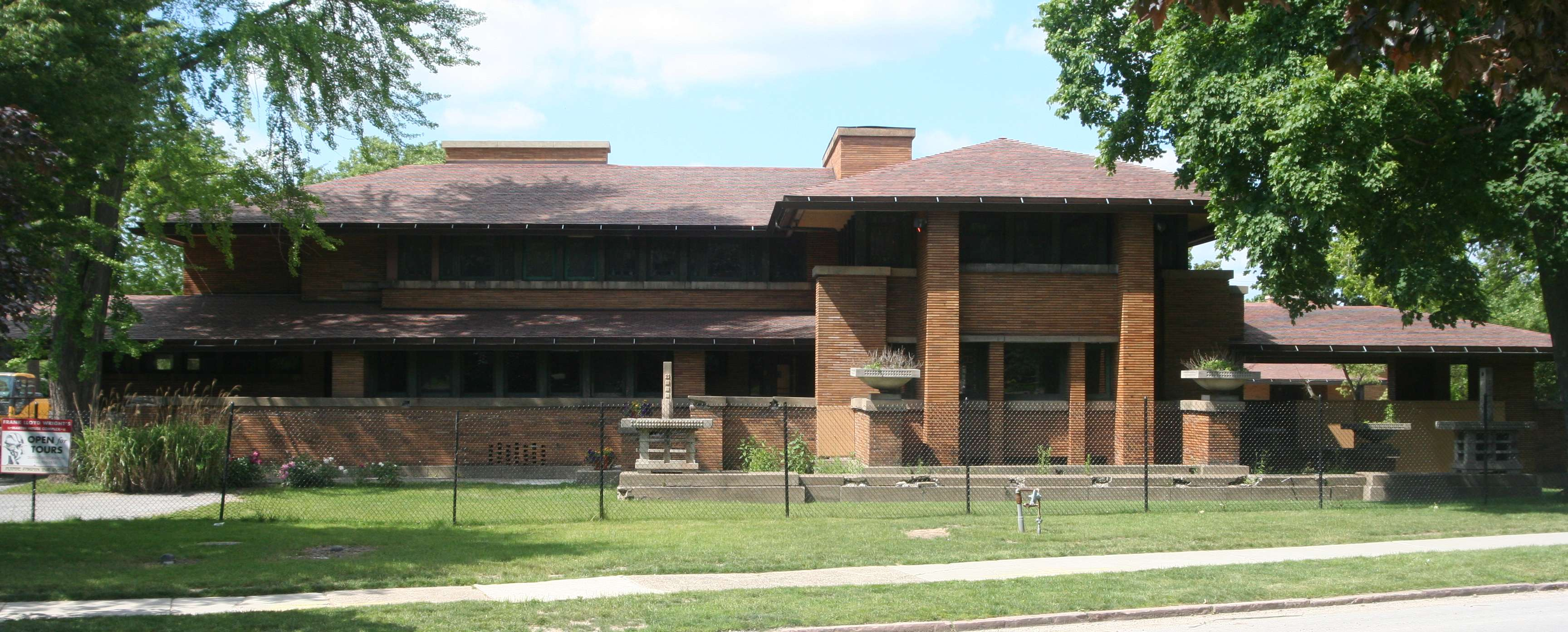
Darwin D. Martin House (by Frank Lloyd Wright)

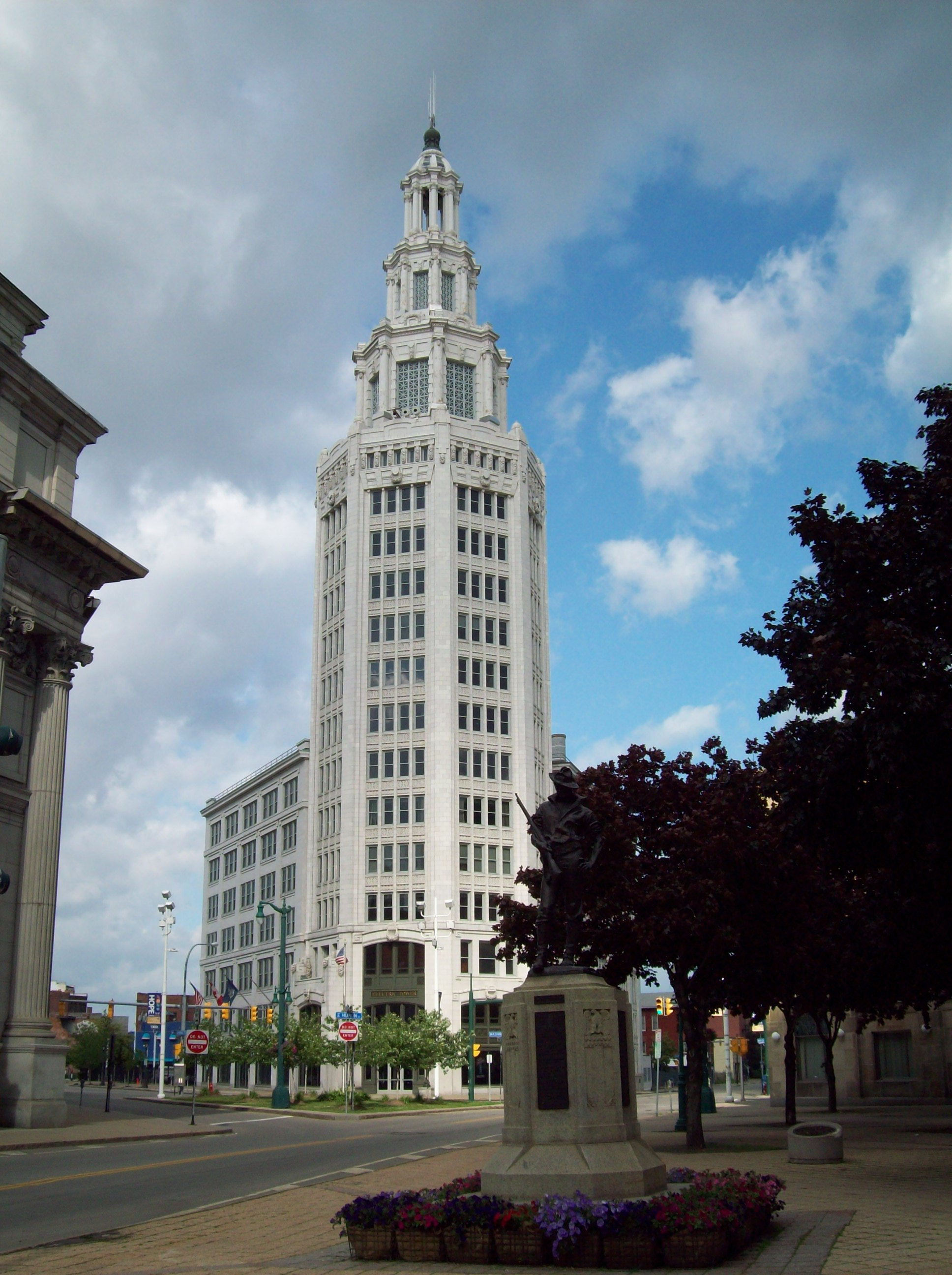
Electric Tower

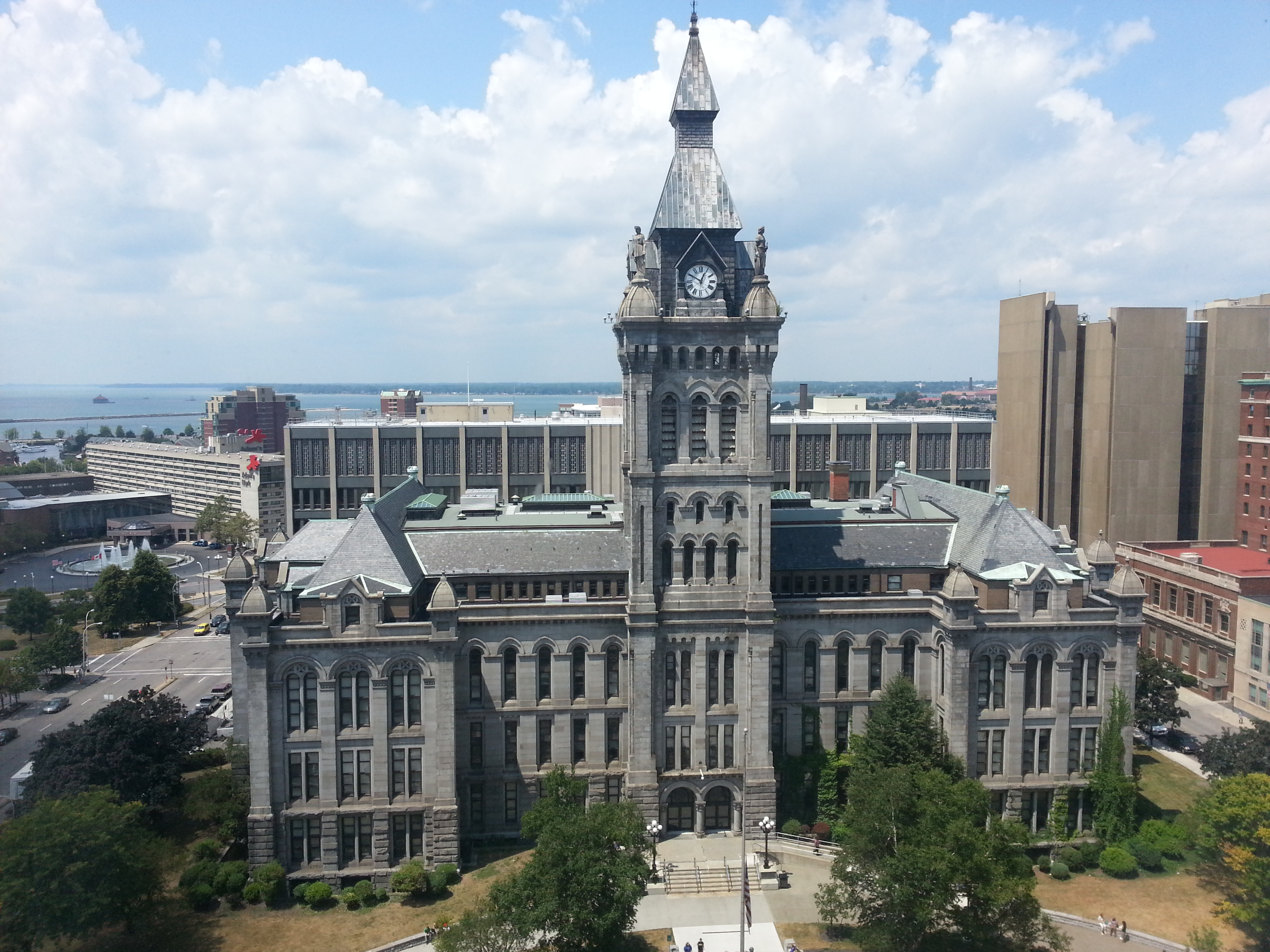
Erie County Hall

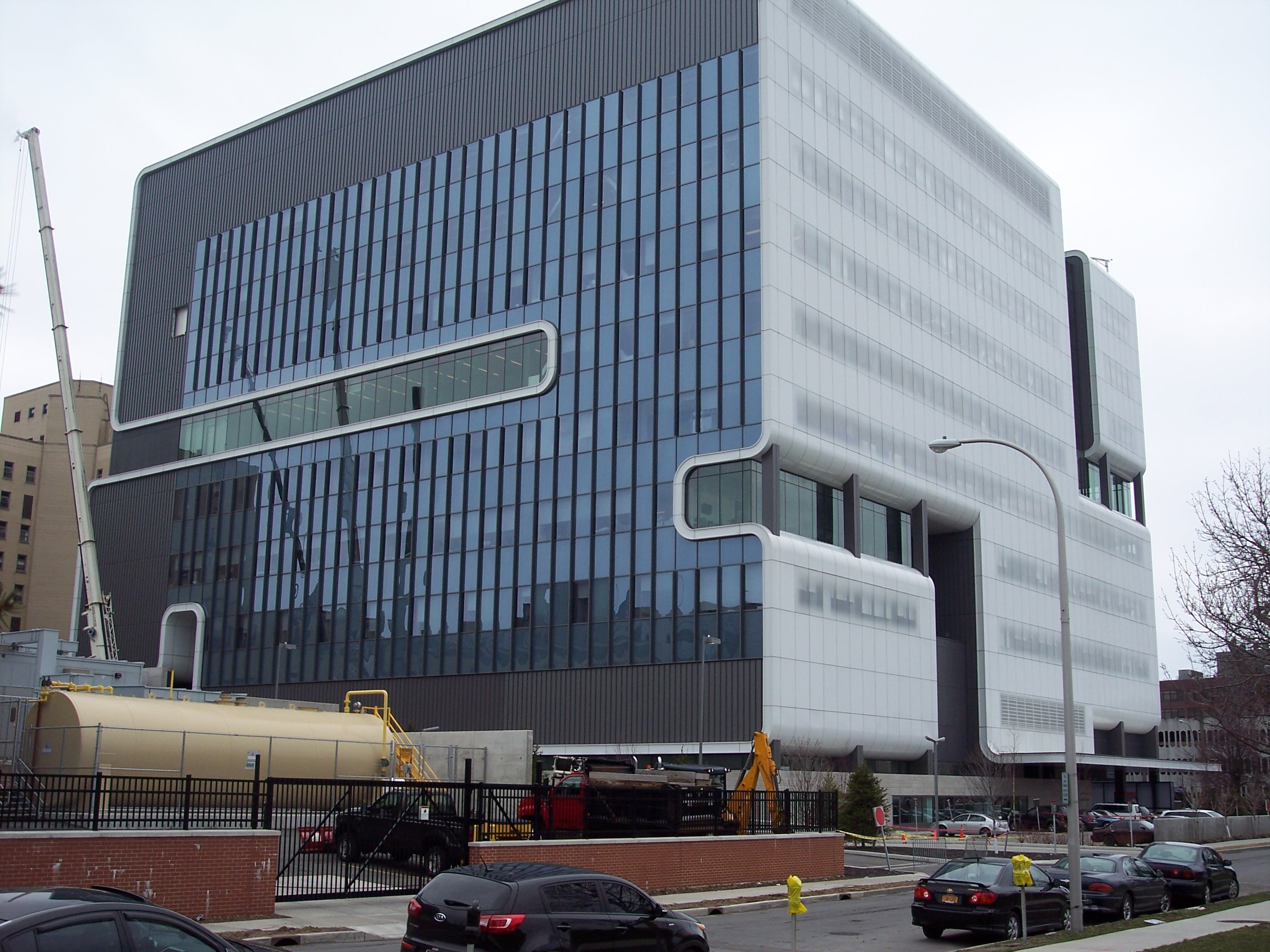
Gates Vascular Institute - Kaleida Health

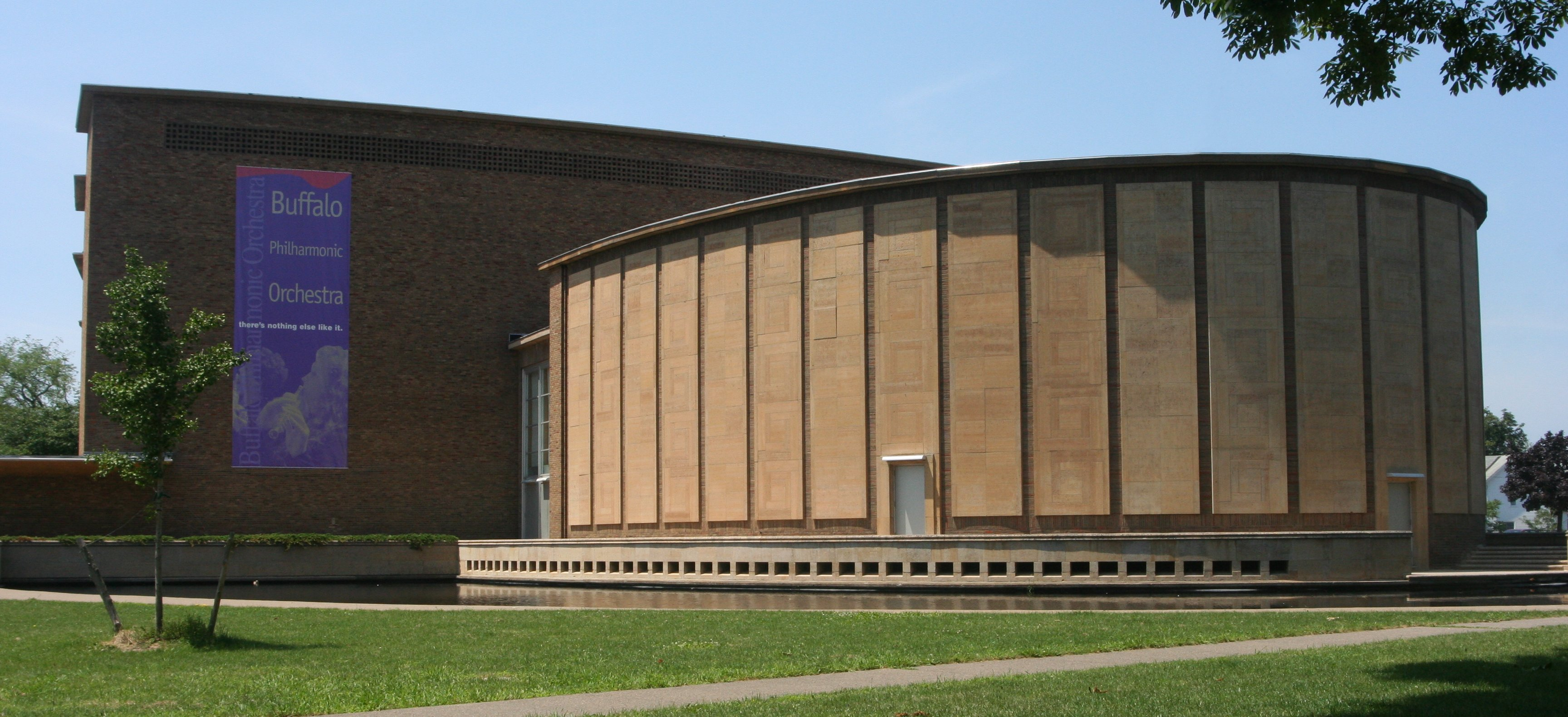
Kleinhans Music Hall (by Eliel Saarinen and Eero Saarinen)

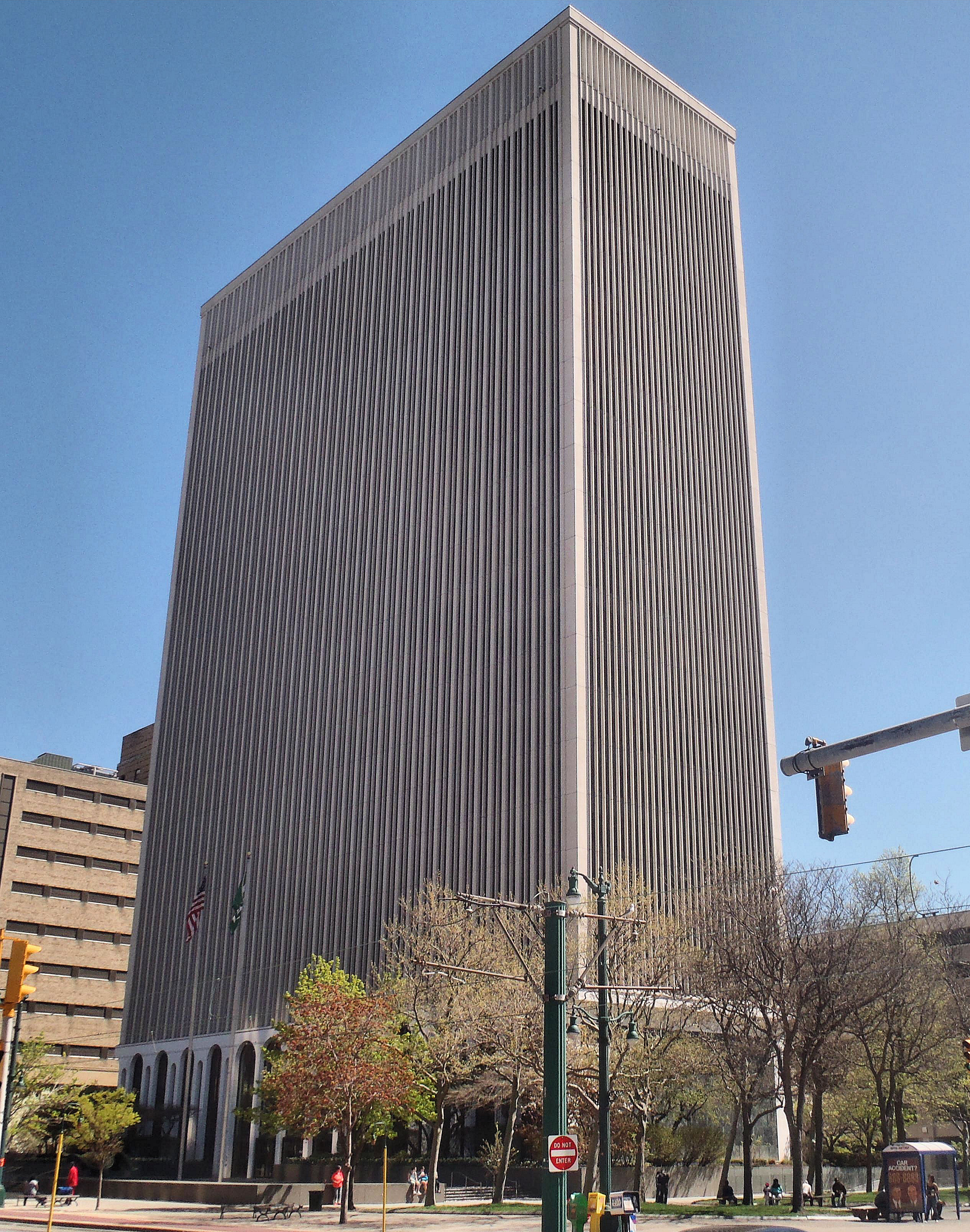
One M&T Plaza (by Minoru Yamasaki)

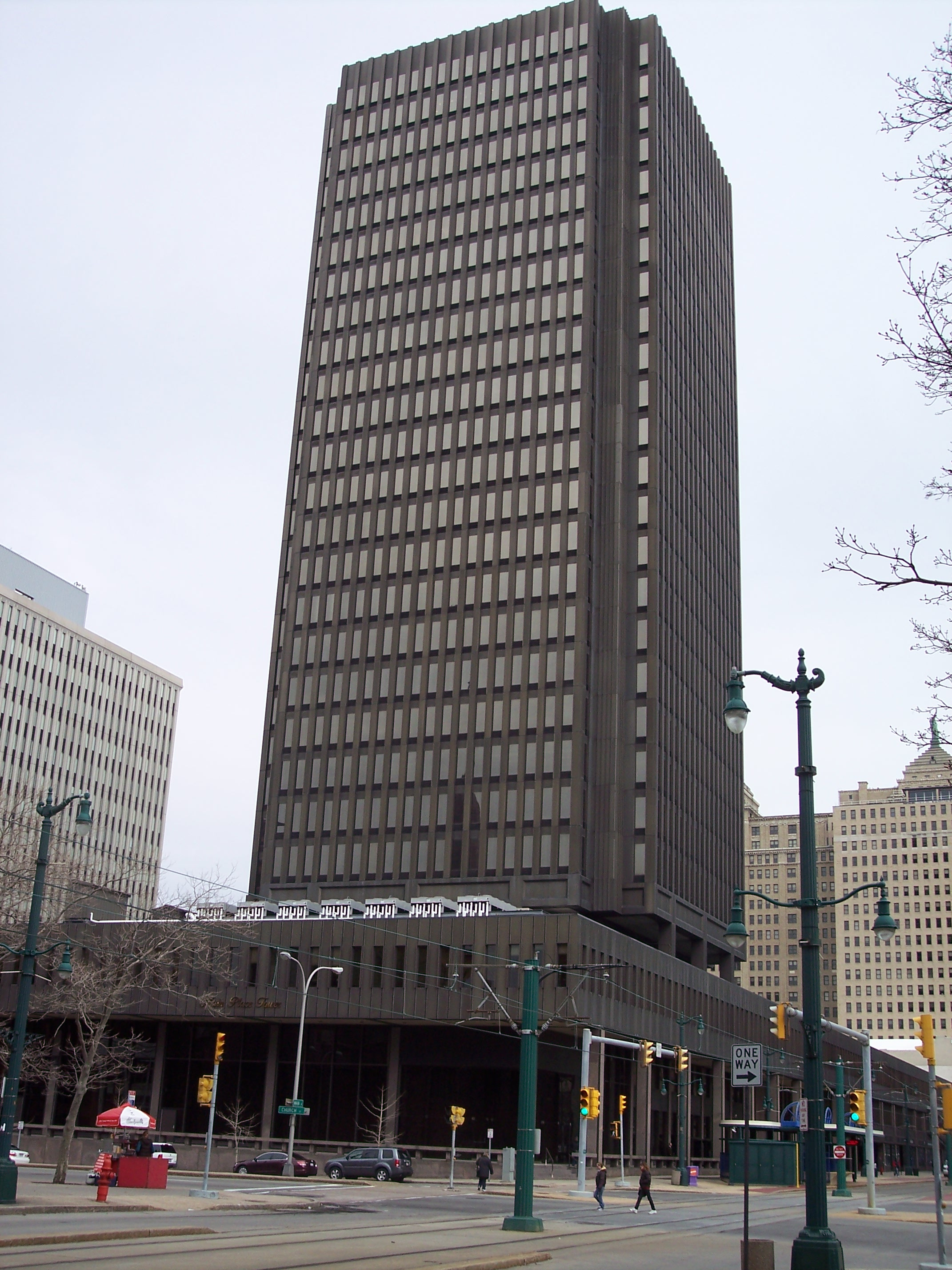
Main Place Tower by Harrison & Abramovitz

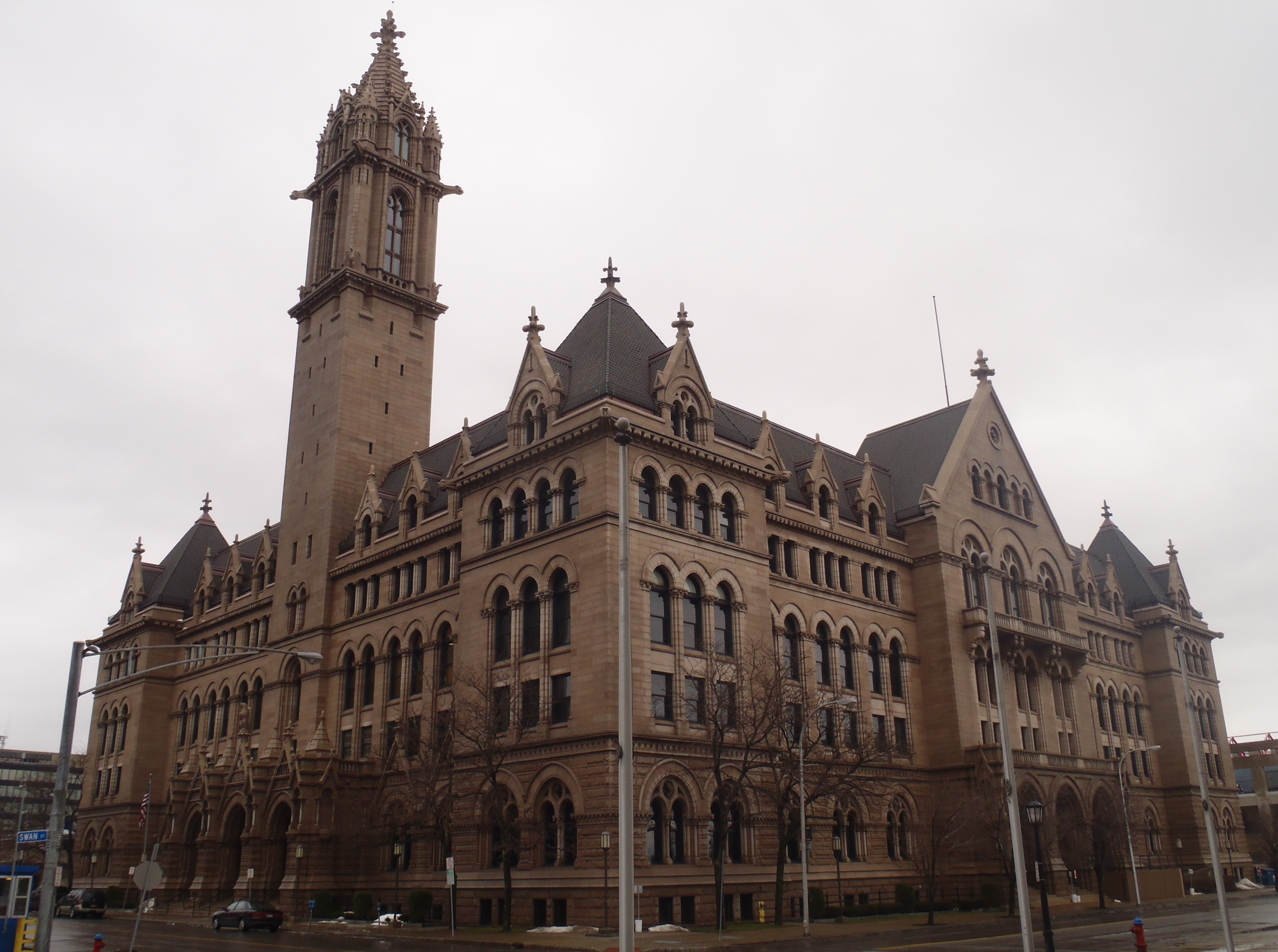
Old Post Office or "U.S. Post Office"

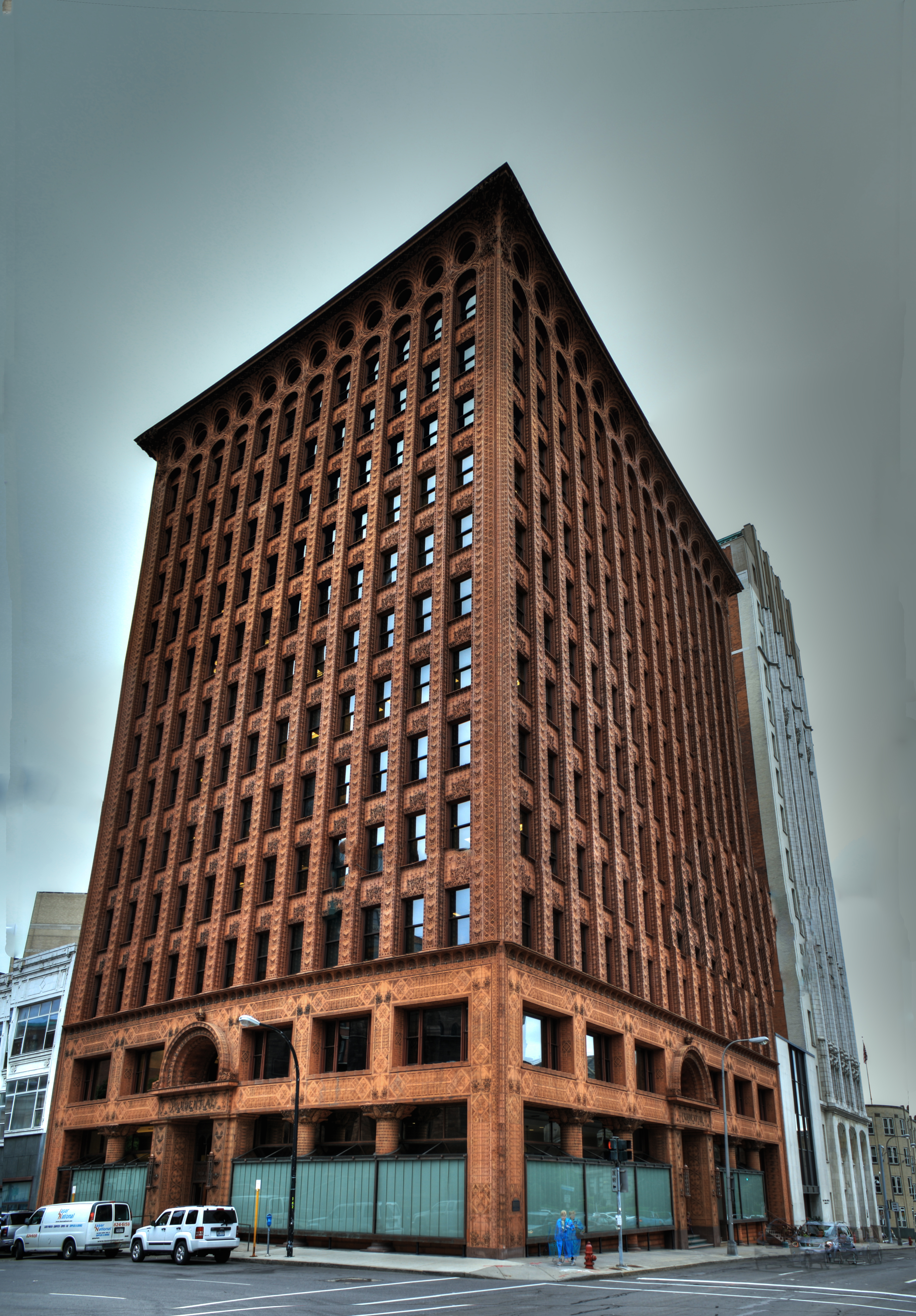
Guaranty Building (Buffalo, New York)

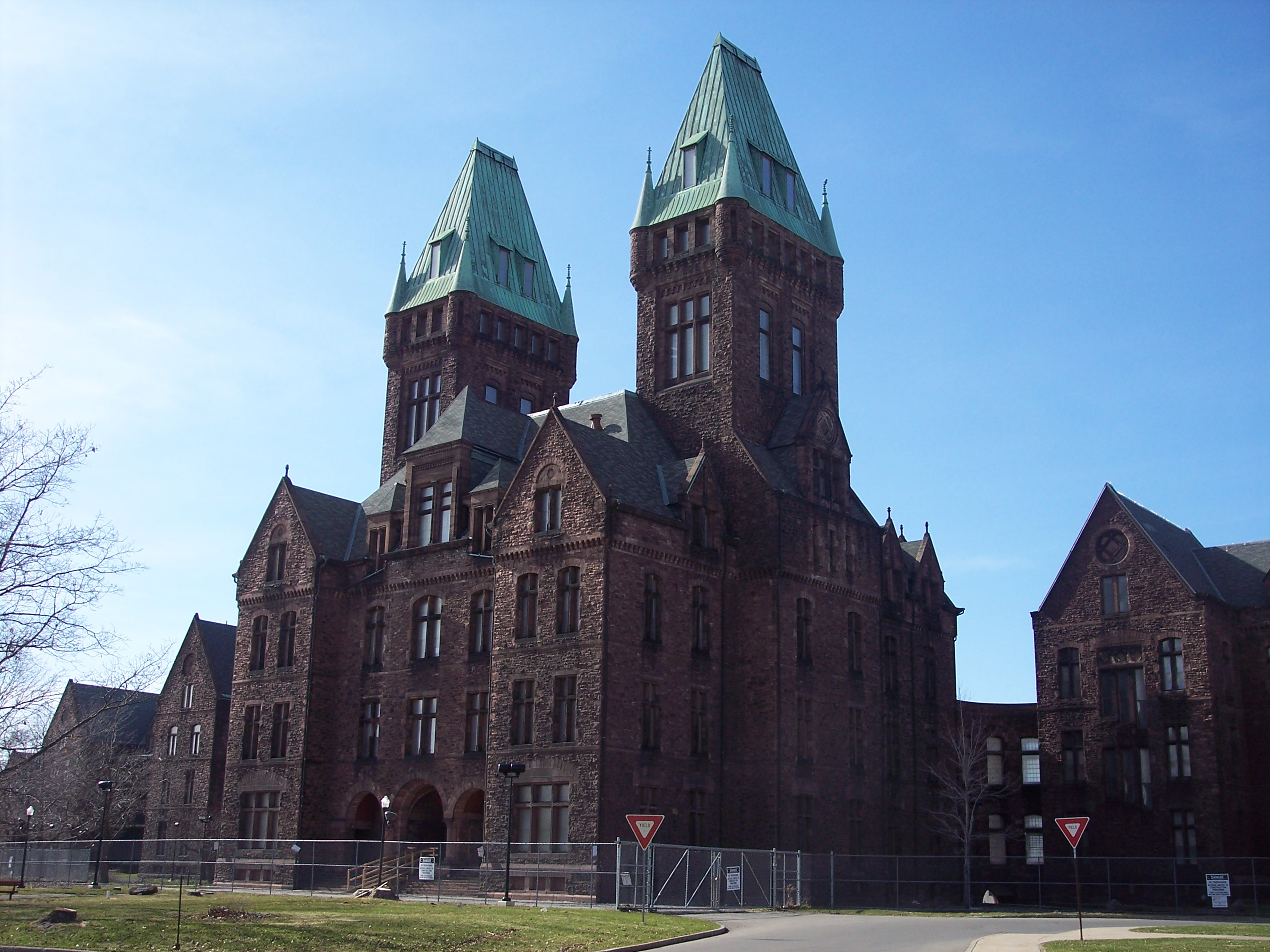
Richardson Olmsted Complex

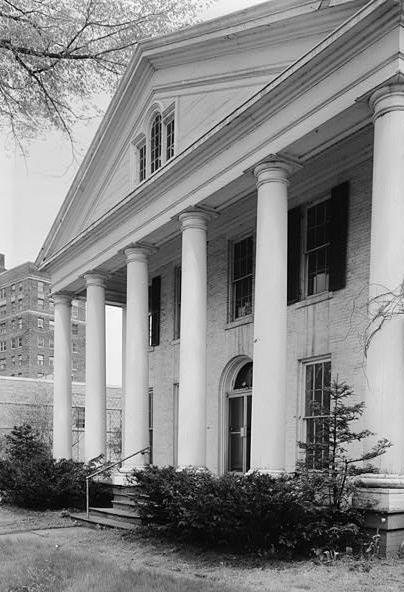
Ansley Wilcox House

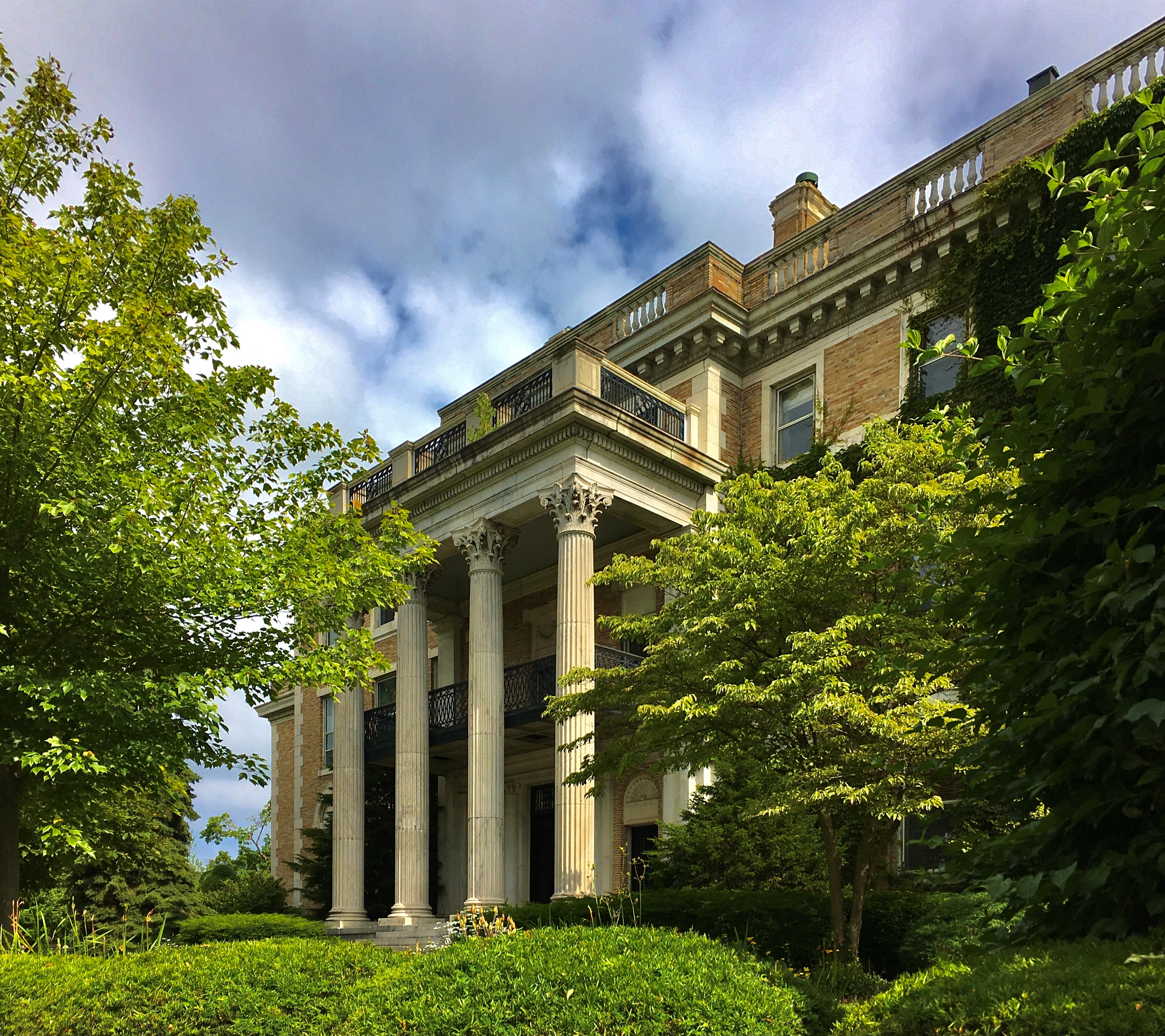
Williams-Butler House by McKim, Mead & White

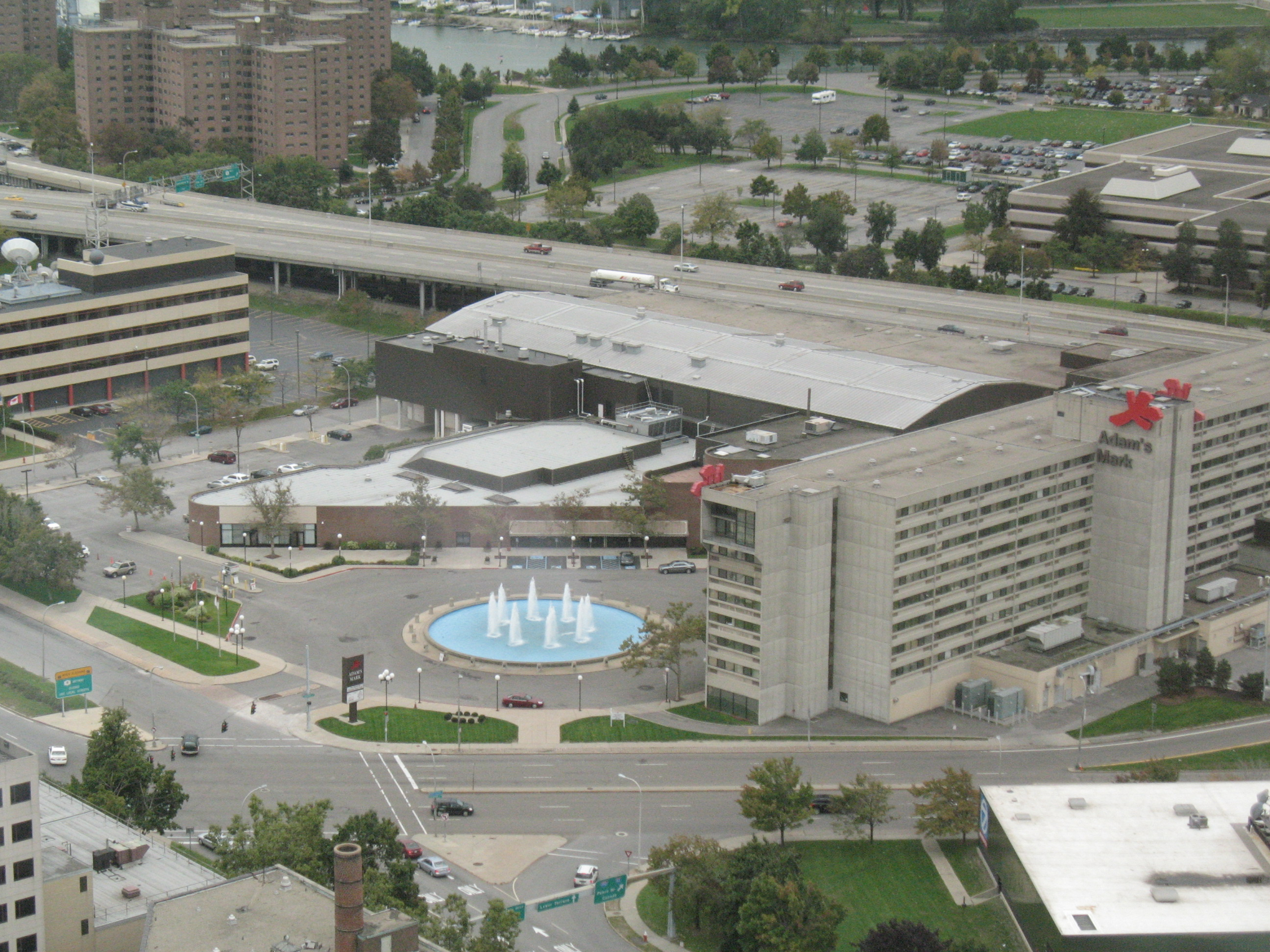
The old Adam's Mark Hotel, reopened in 2018 as the Buffalo Grand Hotel

== Timeline of notable buildings ==
Before 1900:

- 1833 Buffalo Main Light
- 1840 Ansley Wilcox House, George Cary
- 1849–1851 St. Paul's Cathedral, Richard Upjohn
- 1868 William Dorsheimer House, Henry Hobson Richardson
- 1870 Richardson Olmsted Complex, Henry Hobson Richardson and Frederick Law Olmsted
- 1871 Delaware Avenue Methodist Episcopal Church, John Selkirk; 2000–2006, renovation to Babeville Flynn Battaglia
- 1871 County and City Hall, Andrew Warner
- 1882 Metcalfe House, McKim, Mead & White (Demolished, 1980)
- 1889 St. Louis Roman Catholic Church, Schikel and Ditmar
- 1890–1893 Erie County Savings Bank, George B. Post (Demolished, 1968)
- 1890–1905 Albright–Knox Art Gallery, Edward Brodhead Green; 1962 Skidmore, Owings and Merrill architect Gordon Bunshaft
- 1894 Twentieth Century Club, Green & Wicks
- 1894 Robert Root House, Stanford White of McKim, Mead & White (Demolished, 1935)
- 1895 Birge-Horton House, Green and Wicks
- 1895–1896 Williams-Pratt House, Stanford White of McKim, Mead & White
- 1896 Guaranty Building (Buffalo, New York), Louis Sullivan and Dankmar Adler
- 1896 Ellicott Square Building, Daniel Burnham
- 1896–1898 Williams-Butler House/Jacobs Executive Development Center, Stanford White of McKim, Mead & White
- 1897 Old Post Office, Office of the Supervising Architect during the tenure of Jeremiah O'Rourke

1900–1920:

- 1900 Buffalo and Erie County Botanical Gardens, Lord & Burnham
- 1901 Buffalo Savings Bank, Green & Wicks
- 1901 Buffalo History Museum, George Cary
- 1901 Temple of Music, Esenwein & Johnson (Demolished, 1902)
- 1901–1902 YMCA Central Building or Olympic Towers, Green & Wicks
- 1902–1911 Hotel Lafayette, Bethune, Bethune & Fuchs; 1916–1917 and 1924–1926 additions, Esenwein & Johnson
- 1903 Charles W. Goodyear House, Edward Brodhead Green
- 1903–1904 George Barton House, Frank Lloyd Wright
- 1903–1905 Darwin D. Martin House, Frank Lloyd Wright
- 1903–1906 Larkin Administration Building, Frank Lloyd Wright (Demolished, 1950)
- 1904–1905 William R. Heath House, Frank Lloyd Wright
- 1906 The Calumet, Esenwein & Johnson
- 1908 Walter V. Davidson House, Frank Lloyd Wright
- 1911–1912 Larkin Terminal Warehouse, Lockwood, Greene & Co.
- 1912 City Honors School or Fosdick-Masten Park High School, Esenwein & Johnson
- 1912 Electric Tower, Esenwein & Johnson and E.B. Green and Sons
- 1912 Harlow C. Curtiss Building, Paul F. Mann
- 1913 The Marin, Green & Wicks
- 1914–1915 South Park High School, Edward Brodhead Green
- 1915 Concrete-Central Elevator, H.R. Wait and Monarch Engineering Co.

1920–1939:

- 1922 Saturn Club, Bley & Lyman
- 1923 Hotel Statler or Statler City, George B. Post & Sons
- 1924 M. Wile and Company Factory Building, Esenwein & Johnson
- 1925 Cargill Pool Elevator, C. D. Howe and Monarch Engineering Co.
- 1925 Liberty Building, Alfred C. Bossom; 1961 addition Lyman & Associates
- 1926 Shea's Performing Arts Center, Rapp and Rapp
- 1926 The Huyler Building, Harvey Starin Horton
- 1929 Buffalo Central Terminal, Fellheimer & Wagner
- 1929 Buffalo Museum of Science, Esenwein & Johnson
- 1929 Rand Building, F. J. & W. A. Kidd; James William Kideney & Associates
- 1931 Buffalo City Hall, Dietel, Wade & Jones
- 1934 Edwin M. and Emily S. Johnston House, Bley & Lyman
- 1936 Michael J. Dillon Memorial United States Courthouse, E.B. Green and Sons and Bley & Lyman
- 1938 Erie County Holding Center, Green & James
- 1938–1940 Kleinhans Music Hall, Eliel Saarinen and Eero Saarinen
- 1939–1940 Buffalo Memorial Auditorium, Green & James

1940 to the present:

- 1964–1966 One M&T Plaza, Minoru Yamasaki and Lyman Associates
- 1969 Main Place Tower, Harrison & Abramovitz
- 1969–1972 Seneca One Tower, Skidmore, Owings & Merrill
- 1973 The Avant; 2009 renovation, Stieglitz Snyder Architecture
- 1974 Buffalo City Court Building, Pfohl, Roberts and Biggie
- 1987 Sahlen Field, HOK Sport
- 1990 50 Fountain Plaza, Brisbin Brook Beynon Architects
- 1994–1996 KeyBank Center, Ellerbe Becket
  Bergmann Associates PC
- 2004 Blue Sky Mausoleum, Anthony Puttnam of Taliesin Associated Architects from Frank Lloyd Wright design, 1935
- 2007–2011 Robert H. Jackson United States Courthouse, Kohn Pedersen Fox
- 2009 Eleanor and Wilson Greatbatch Pavilion, Toshiko Mori
- 2012 Gates Vascular Institute, Mehrdad Yazdani of CannonDesign
- 2014–2015 Delaware North Building, Diamond and Schmitt Architects
- 2015 LECOM Harborcenter , Populous Holdings
- 2015 Scott Bieler Clinical Sciences Center
- 2017 Golisano Children's Hospital of Buffalo
- 2019 500 Pearl Street

== Styles and schools ==
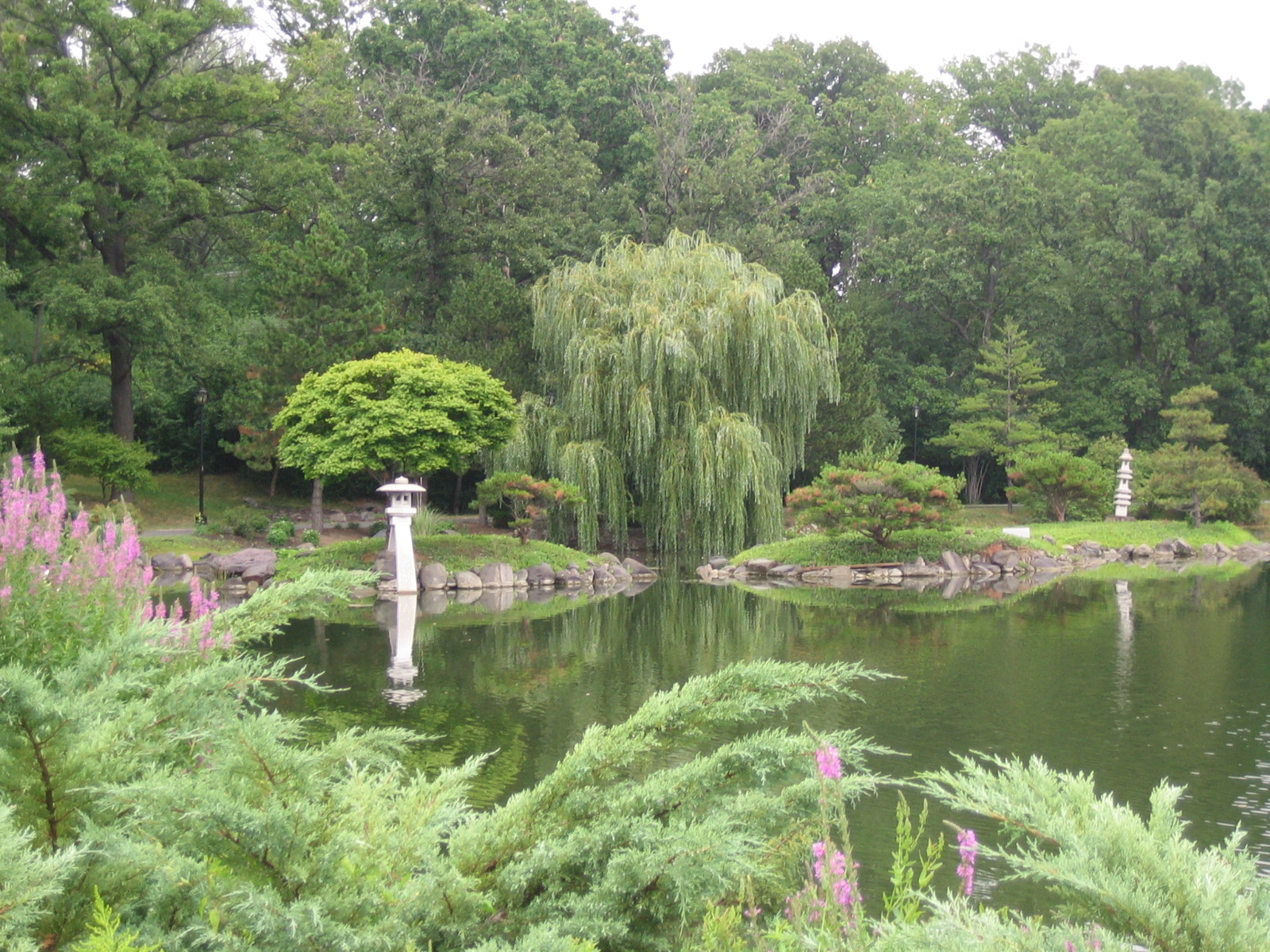
Japanese Garden, Delaware Park

Buffalo architects used many design styles and belonged to a variety of architectural schools. Below is a sample of some of the styles and schools and schools found in Buffalo architecture:

- Art Deco
- Art Nouveau
- Brutalism
- Châteauesque
- Federal Style
- Gothic Revival
- Greek Revival
- Italianate
- Second Empire
- Sullivanesque
- Victorian
- Queen Anne

== See also ==
- Buffalo, New York
- National Register of Historic Places listings in Buffalo, New York
- List of National Historic Landmarks in New York
- List of tallest buildings in Buffalo, New York
