= List of tallest buildings in Buffalo =

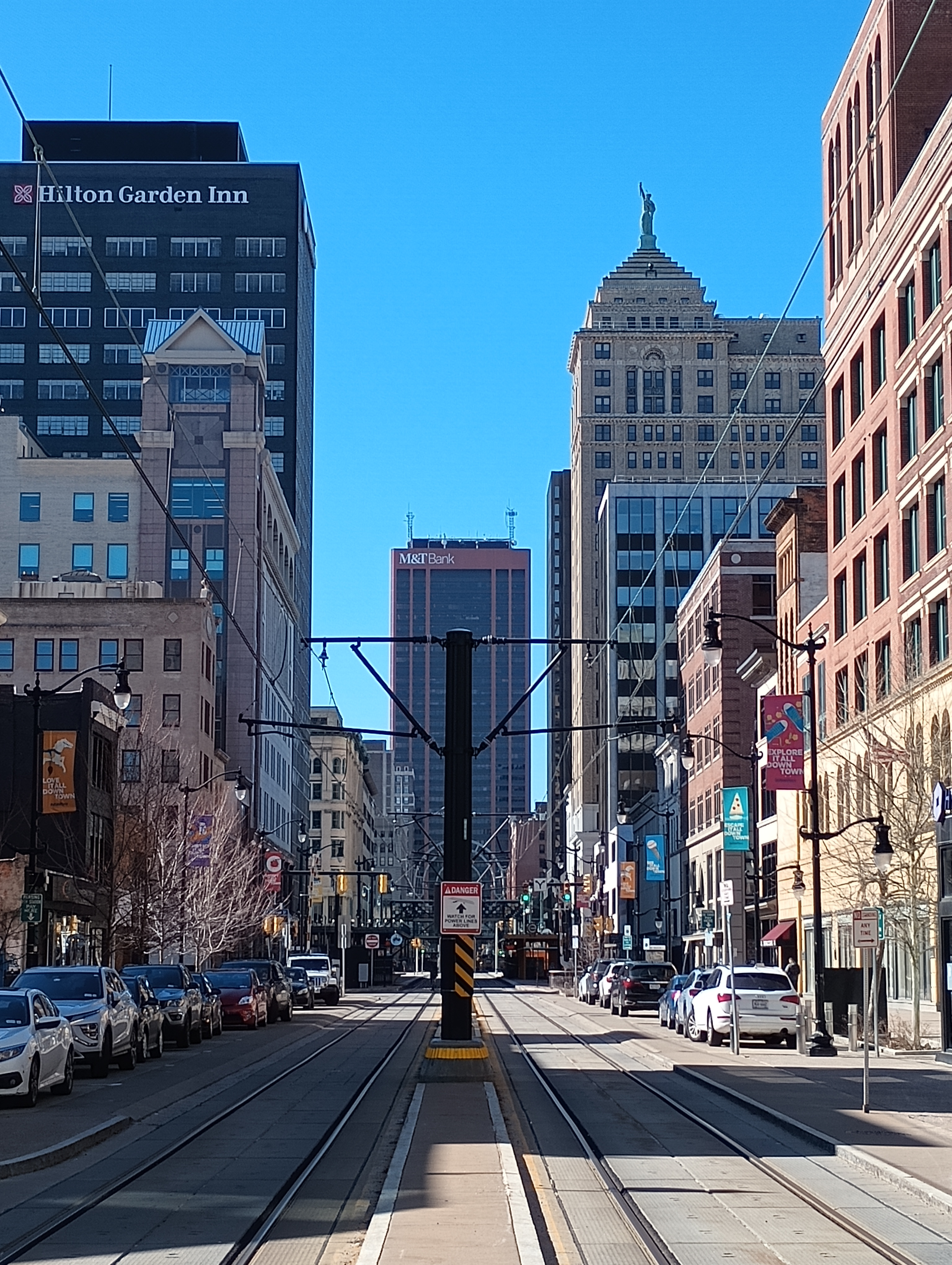
Downtown Buffalo looking down Main Street

The tallest building in Buffalo, the second largest city in New York State, is currently the Seneca One Tower, which stands 529 feet (161 m) tall. As of 2026, Buffalo has 17 structures taller than 250 ft (76 m).

Buffalo has a rich tradition for architecture. Among the first true skyscrapers built in the city were the Guaranty Building (Buffalo, New York) and the Ellicott Square Building, both being built in the 1890s. A number of the tallest municipal buildings in the country were also built in the city, such as Buffalo City Hall, which continues to dominate the skyline. The city is also home to a large collection of large grain elevators, many of which rise above 150 ft (46 m). Construction of high rise buildings has increased in recent years after decades of relative dormancy, in addition to the retro-fitting of many old structures.

== Tallest buildings ==
This lists ranks Buffalo buildings that stand at least 128 feet (39 m) tall, based on standard height measurement. This includes spires and architectural details but does not include antenna masts. Existing structures are included for ranking purposes based on present height.

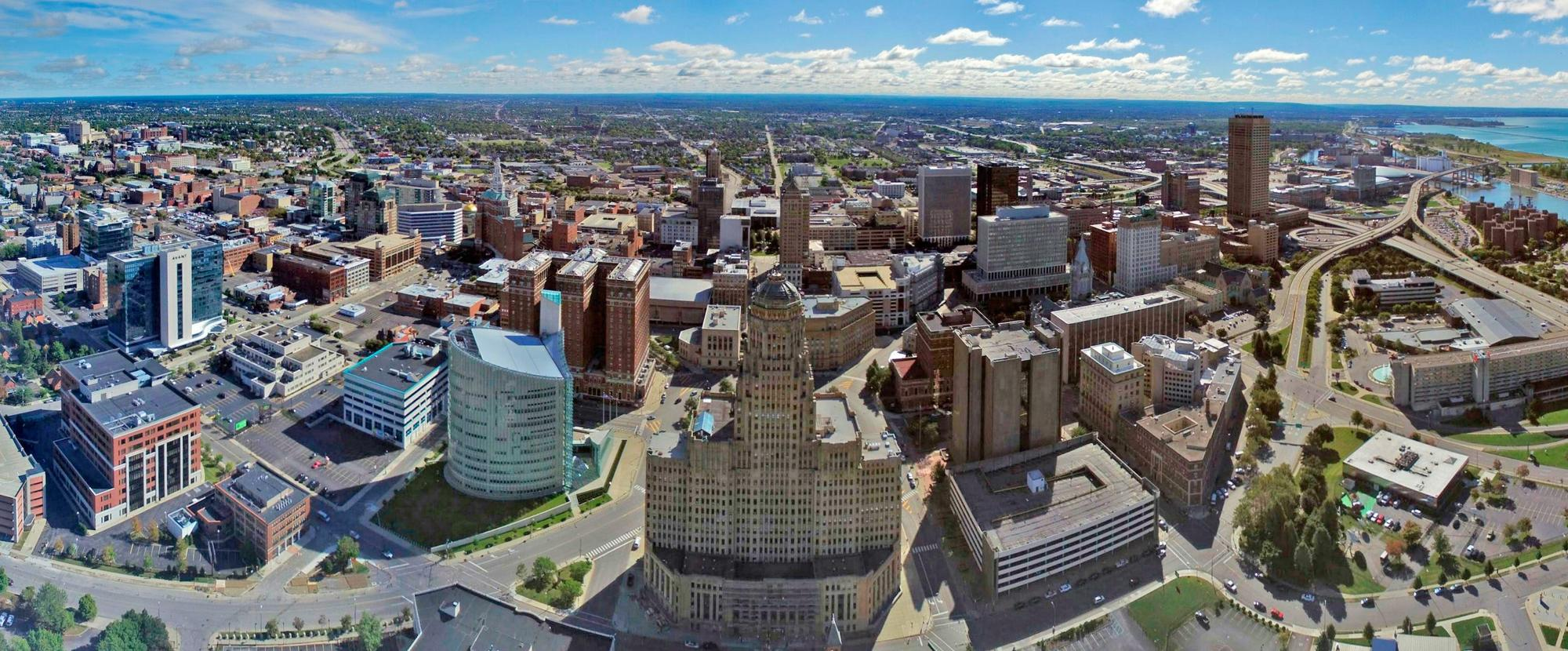
Skyline of Buffalo from the Niagara River, 2015

Rank	Name	Image	Height feet / m	Floors	Year	Notes
1	Seneca One Tower		529 / 161	40	1972	Tallest building in the city. Tallest building constructed in the 1970s. Previously known as One Seneca Tower (2013–2017), One HSBC Center (1999–2013), Marine Midland Center (1972–1999).
2	Rand Building		405 / 123	29	1929	Tallest building constructed in the 1920s.
3	Buffalo City Hall		398 / 121	32	1931	Tallest building constructed in the 1930s.
4	Main Place Tower		350 / 107	26	1969	Tallest building constructed in the 1960s.
5	Liberty Building		345 / 105	23	1925	
6	One M&T Plaza		317 / 97	21	1966	
7	Electric Tower		294 / 90	14	1912	Also known as the Niagara Mohawk Building. Tallest building constructed in the 1910s.
8	Saint Paul's Episcopal Cathedral		275 / 84		1851	Tallest building constructed in the 1850s
9	50 Fountain Plaza		275 / 84	17	1990	Tallest building constructed in the 1990s. Formerly known as Key Center North Tower.
10	Buffalo Central Terminal		271 / 83	20	1929	Also known as the New York Central Terminal Complex.
11	Erie County Hall		270 / 82		1876	Tallest building constructed in the 1870s. Also known as County and City Hall and Old Erie County Hall.
12	Statler Hotel		265 / 81	19	1923	Also known as the Statler Towers.
13	10 Lafayette Square		263 / 80	23	1959	Tallest building constructed in the 1950s. Also known as the Tishman Building.
14	Verizon/AT&T Building		258 / 79	16	1913	Previously known as The Telephone Company Building.
15	Robert H. Jackson United States Courthouse		255 / 78	10	2011	Tallest building constructed in the 2010s.
16	Golisano Children's Hospital of Buffalo		252 / 77 (est)	12	2017	Formerly known as John R. Oishei Children's Hospital
17	The Marin		250 / 76	17	1913	Formerly known as the Marine Midland Trust Company Building; Main Seneca Building.
18	Genesee Building/Hyatt Regency Hotel		249 / 76	16	1923	Formerly known as the Genesee House and The Genesee Hotel.
19	Saint Louis Roman Catholic Church		246 / 75		1889	Tallest building constructed in the 1880s
20	Old Post Office		244 / 74		1901	Now Erie Community College City Campus. Also known as U.S. Post Office
21	LECOM Harborcenter		240 / 73 (est)	20	2015	Connected to KeyBank Center
22	Saint Mary of Sorrows Roman Catholic Church		241 / 72		1891	Now King Urban Life Center
23	The Avant		225 / 69	15	1973 / 2009	Former Thaddeus J. Dulski Federal Building
24	40 Fountain Plaza		225 / 69	13	1990	Formerly known as Key Center South Tower
25	Edward A. Rath County Office Building		223 / 68	16	1969	
26	Church of St. Stanislaus, Bishop and Martyr		217 / 66		1886	
27	Buffalo General Hospital Building A		213 / 65	16	1986	Tallest building constructed in the 1980s.
28	Wheeler Elevator		207 / 63	13		Also known as Buffalo RiverWorks; Agway/GLF East Work House
29	Concrete-Central Elevator		207 / 63	7	1915	
30	Erie County Medical Center		195 / 59	13	1978	
31	Delaware North Building		194 / 59*	12	2015	*Height: 174/53 to roof level, 194/59 to top of mechanicals (Source: Developer)
32	Standard Elevator		194 / 59		1928	Also known as Pillsbury Elevator.
33	Kaleida Health Gates Vascular Institute		190 / 58	10	2011	
34	Marine A Elevator		190 / 58	11	1925	
35	Superior Elevator		189 / 58		1925	Also known as Cargill "S" or Cargill Superior Elevator.
36	Main Court Building		188 / 57	13	1963	
37	Asbury Delaware Avenue United Methodist Church		184 / 56		1876	Also known as Delaware Avenue Methodist Episcopal Church.
38	Westminster Presbyterian Church		184 / 56		1859	
39	Scott Bieler Clinical Sciences Center		182 / 56	11	2015	Part of Roswell Park Comprehensive Cancer Center.
40	Church of the Transfiguration	TransfigurationBuffalo	180 / 55		1896	
41	City Centre Condominiums		180 / 55	14	1993	
42	Buffalo VA Medical Center		177 / 54	14	1950	
43	Kreiner Malting Grain Elevator		177 / 54		1925	Also known as the Buffalo Malting Elevator.
44	Corpus Christi Roman Catholic Church		175 / 53		1907	
45	Connecting Terminal		174 / 53		1915	
46	Cargill Pool Elevator		174 / 53		1925	Also known as the Saskatchewan Cooperative Elevator.
47	The Pasquale		173 / 53 (est.)	13	2009	Tallest building constructed in the 2000s. Luxury condos.
48	10 Hertel Avenue		173 / 53 (est.)	13	1972	Part of the Marina Vista Apartments complex. Formerly known as Watergate II Apartments 1. Public housing.
49	12 Hertel Avenue		173 / 53 (est.)	13	1972	Part of the Marina Vista Apartments complex. Formerly known as Watergate II Apartments 2. Public housing.
50	Assumption Roman Catholic Church		170 / 52		1915	
51	Prudential/Guaranty Building		167 / 51	13	1896	
52	AM&A Building		166 / 51	12	1948	Tallest building constructed in the 1940s.
53	Ellicott Square Building		164 / 50	10	1896	
54	First Presbyterian Church		164 / 50		1891	
55	Olympic Towers		161 / 49	11	1903	Also known as the Young Men's Christian Association Central Building.
56	Richardson Olmsted Complex		161 / 49	4	1871	Formerly known as the Buffalo State Asylum for the Insane, Buffalo State Hospital, and Hotel Henry. Alternatively known as The Richardson Hotel.
57	General Mills Plant		161 / 49	12		Also known as the Frontier Elevator.
58	800 West Ferry Street		161 / 49 (est.)	12	1929	High-rise condominium tower.
59	The Admiral		160 / 49 (est.)	12	1952	Part of the Marine Drive Apartments complex. Public housing.
60	The Bayshore		160 / 49 (est.)	12	1952	Part of the Marine Drive Apartments complex. Public housing.
61	The Coastline		160 / 49 (est.)	12	1952	Part of the Marine Drive Apartments complex. Public housing.
62	The Driftwood		160 / 49 (est.)	12	1952	Part of the Marine Drive Apartments complex. Public housing.
63	The Ebbtide		160 / 49 (est.)	12	1952	Part of the Marine Drive Apartments complex. Public housing.
64	Elmwood Square Apartments		160 / 49 (est.)	12	1973	Section 8 public housing for senior citizens.
65	The Flagstaff		160 / 49 (est.)	12	1952	Part of the Marine Drive Apartments complex. Public housing.
66	The Gulfstream		160 / 49 (est.)	12	1952	Part of the Marine Drive Apartments complex. Public housing.
67	M&T Center (Buffalo Savings Bank extension)		160 / 49 (est.)	12	1985	The building is a north side addition to the Buffalo Savings Bank
68	Marguerite Hall		160 / 49 (est.)	12	1966	D'Youville College dormitory
69	Riverview Manor		160 / 49 (est)	12	1977	Also known as Riverview Apartments. Apartment building for senior citizens.
70	Buffalo City Court Building		154 / 47 (est.)	10	1974	
71	St. Mary's Cement Storage Tanks		154 / 47		1910	Also known as the Spencer Kellogg Elevator
72	American Grain Complex		151 / 46	10	1933	Also known as the Perot Malting Elevator; Genesee Brewing Elevator; The American, and Russell-Miller Milling Co. Elevator, and Peavey Co. Elevator.
73	500 Pearl Street		151 / 46	12	2019	
74	Lake & Rail Grain Elevator		151 / 46	9	1927	
75	Saint Adalbert's Basilica		151 / 46		1886	
76	Swan Tower		148 / 45	10	1902	Also known as the Fidelity Trust Building.
77	Admiral's Walk Condominiums		147 / 45 (est.)	11	1990	Luxury condos.
78	Churchill Academic Tower		147 / 45 (est.)	11	1971	Houses Canisius University classrooms and lecture halls.
79	PSG Residences		147 / 45 (est.)	11	1978	Also known as Piotr Stadnitski Gardens. Apartment building for senior citizens.
80	Santa Maria Towers		147 / 45 (est.)	11	1984	Apartment building for senior citizens.
81	Women and Children's Hospital of Buffalo		145 / 44 (est.)	11	1956	Closed in 2017 and was replaced with Golisano Children's Hospital of Buffalo located on the Buffalo Niagara Medical Campus.
82	The Delaware Tower		142 / 43 (est.)	17	1962	
83	Buffalo Athletic Club		141 / 43 (est.)	12	1922	
84	Cathedral Place		140 / 43 (est.)	10	1906	Also known as the White Building.
85	St. Francis de Sales Roman Catholic Church		140 / 43 (est.)		1928	
86	42 Delaware Avenue		136 / 41 (est.)	11	1929	
87	12 Fountain Plaza		133 / 41 (est.)	10	1983	Also known as the Norstar Building.
88	Lyndon B. Johnson Apartments		133 / 41 (est.)	10	1973	Apartment building for senior citizens.
89	Mary Agnes Manor		133 / 41 (est.)	10	1965	Apartment building for senior citizens.
90	Roswell Park Comprehensive Cancer Center		133 / 41 (est.)	10	1998	Formerly known as The Pathological Laboratory of the University of Buffalo (1898 - 1899); The Gratwick Research Laboratory (1900 - 1911); New York State Institute for the Study of Malignant Disease (1912-1945); Roswell Park Memorial Institute (1946 - 1991); and Roswell Park Cancer Institute (1992 - 2017).
91	Baptist Manor Apartments		133 / 41 (est.)	16	1976	
92	Clement Hall		133 / 41	11	1964	Residence hall at the University at Buffalo's South Campus.
93	Goodyear Hall		133 / 41	11	1960	Residence hall at the University at Buffalo's South Campus.
94	Kimball Tower		133 / 41	11	1957	Houses the University at Buffalo's School of Public Health and Health Professions.
95	Dun Building		130 / 40	10	1895	
96	Erie County Court Building		130 / 40 (est)	8	1965	
97	Larkin @ Exchange		130 / 40 (est)	8	1912	Also known as the Larkin Building, Graphic Controls Corporation Building, Larkin Terminal Warehouse.
98	One Canalside		129 / 39	8	1962 / 2013	Formerly General William J. Donovan State Office Building.
99	Buffalo General Hospital Building D		128 / 39	8	1901	Also known as Buffalo General Hospital Administration Building; Buffalo General Hospital East Wing.
100	Convention Tower		128 / 39 (est.)	12	1924	Also known as the Walbridge Building.

== Tallest proposed or under construction ==
This lists buildings (greater than 12 floors) that have been proposed in Buffalo.

Name	Height feet / m	Floors	Year Proposed	Status	Notes
Marine Drive Apartments Building A	+160/+49m	12	2023	Under Construction	Planned main building for redeveloped Marine Drive Apartments.

=== Tallest cancelled and stale proposals ===
This section denotes proposals that are now cancelled or the proposal has sat longer than 2 years.

Name	Height feet / m	Floors	Year Proposed	Status	Notes
Unity Tower at Cobblestone Place	+656/+200m	55	2020	Stale proposal	Proposed tongue-in-cheek by owner at the time of Cobblestone buildings. Nothing ever materialized from this plan.
Buffalo City Tower	600 / 183	40	2006	cancelled	This project was cancelled due to the financial woes of the developer, BSC Group
Apartments at Queen City Landing	324 / 99	20	2016	cancelled	Proposed height later reduced from 23 to 20 stories. Project was repeatedly stymied by litigation due to environmental concerns, "suspended indefinitely" in 2020 due to the developer's inability to secure financing from the city, and definitively cancelled in 2021 when the property was put up for sale.
33 Gates Circle	297 / 85	23	2006	cancelled	Project cancelled due to the 2008 financial crisis. In 2018, the developer proposed a series of three-story, 12-unit townhouses for the site.
Seneca Buffalo Creek Casino Hotel Tower	220 / 67	22	2010	cancelled	The Seneca Buffalo Creek Casino was completed in 2013 without the hotel tower
Adelphia Tower	220 / 67	15	2004	cancelled	The project size and scope was altered several times (40 floors, 38 floors, 22 floors and finally 15 floors) before being cancelled
The Carlo	186 / 57 (est)	14	2012	Stale Proposal	

== Tallest destroyed buildings ==
This lists buildings in the city of Buffalo that once existed and rose at least 150 ft (46 m) but have since been destroyed.

Name	Image	Height feet / m	Floors	Year built	Year destroyed	Notes
Electric Tower (Pan-American Exposition)		389 / 119		1901	1902	Intended to be temporary and to be destroyed after conclusion of Pan-American Exposition. Not to be confused with the present-day Electric Tower at Washington and East Huron Streets. Tallest building ever destroyed in Upstate New York.
St. Joseph's New Cathedral		240 / 73		1913	1976	
St. Ann's Roman Catholic Church		225 / 69		1885	1964 (partially)	Spires removed due to structural damage after a windstorm, remainder of the building still extant. St. Ann's parish dissolved in 2011 and the building is now vacant.
D. S. Morgan Building		221 / 67	12	1895	1965	The Edward A. Rath County Office Building now occupies the site.
Great Northern Elevator		188 / 57		1897	2023	
A. Victor & Company Department Store		186 / 57	11	1928	1981	
50 High Street		173 / 53	13	1965	2007	Also known as the General Towers Medical Building or Erie Medical Center. Golisano Children's Hospital of Buffalo now occupies the site.
Iroquois Hotel		166 / 51	11	1890	1940	Also known as the Gerrans building. One M&T Plaza now occupies the site.
St. Stephen's Evangelical Church		164 / 50		1874	1923 (partially)	Spire removed in 1923, remainder of the building still extant. Most recently home to Emmanuel Temple Seventh Day Adventist Church; now vacant.
Chamber of Commerce Building		161 / 49	13	1905	1986	
Millard Fillmore Gates Circle Hospital		160 / 49	12	1941	2015	Canterbury Woods Gates Circle now occupies the site.
Ford Hotel	Upload image	151 / 46	13	1922	2000	Hampton Inn and Suites Hotel now occupies the site.
Hotel Buffalo		150 / 46	12	1908	1967	Sahlen Field now occupies the site.

== Timeline of tallest buildings ==
This section lists buildings that once held the title of tallest building in Buffalo. Saint Paul's Episcopal Cathedral held the title twice, both before the construction and after the demolition of the original Electric Tower, which was designed as a temporary building that would only last the length of the Pan-American Exposition.

Years as tallest	Name	Image	Height feet / m	Floors	Notes
1827–1851	First Presbyterian Church		unknown	N/A	Demolished in 1890. Not to be confused with the current First Presbyterian Church building on Symphony Circle, erected in 1897 to a height of 164 feet (50 m). Main Place Tower occupies the site today.
1851–1901	Saint Paul's Episcopal Cathedral		275 / 84	N/A	Tallest building in Upstate New York during this time.
1901–1902	Electric Tower (Pan-American Exposition)		389 / 119	N/A	Demolished shortly after the close of the Pan-American Exposition. Not to be confused with the present-day Electric Tower at Washington and East Huron Streets, listed below. Tallest building in Upstate New York and also second-tallest building in New York State at the time of its construction, only two feet (61 cm) shorter than the Park Row Building in New York City.
1902–1912	Saint Paul's Episcopal Cathedral		275 / 84	N/A	Tallest building in Upstate New York during this time.
1912–1925	Electric Tower		294 / 90	14	Tallest building in Upstate New York 1912–1914.
1925–1929	Liberty Building		345 / 105	23	Tallest building in Upstate New York 1925–1928.
1929–1972	Rand Building		405 / 123	29	Tallest building in Upstate New York 1929–1972. First building to exceed the height of the original Electric Tower, demolished 27 years earlier.
1972-	Seneca One Tower		529 / 161	40	Tallest building in Upstate New York 1972-1973.

== See also ==
- List of tallest buildings in Upstate New York
