= Buffalo Savings Bank =

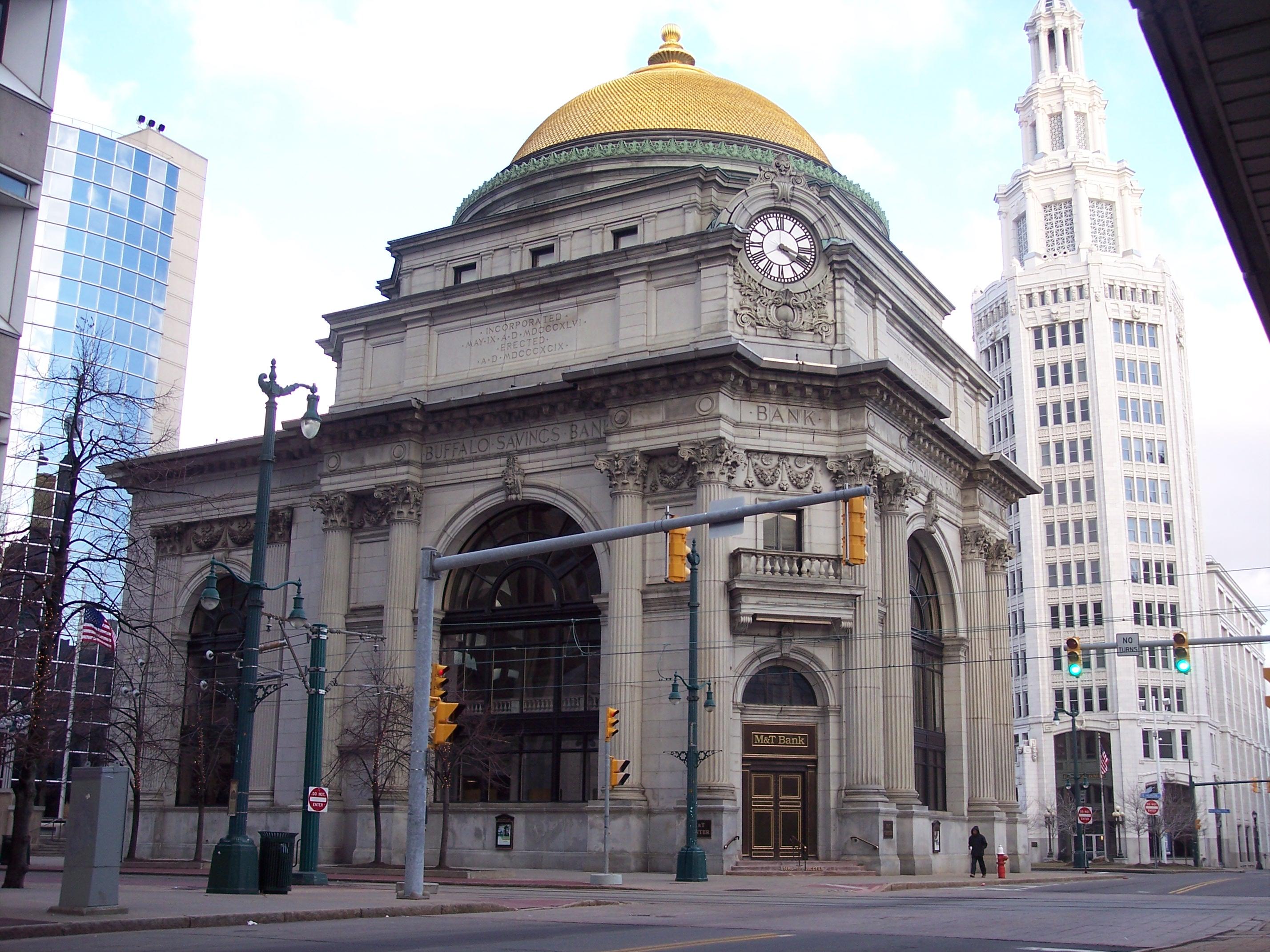
- Buffalo Savings Bank, in Buffalo, NY
- Interactive map of the Buffalo Savings Bank area
- Former names: Goldome

General information
- Status: Completed
- Type: Office
- Architectural style: Beaux-Arts
- Location: 545 Main Street, (1 Fountain Plaza), Buffalo, NY, United States
- Coordinates: 42.888739°N 78.873401°W
- Construction started: 1899
- Completed: 1901
- Opening: May 1901
- Cost: US$ 300 thousand
- Owner: M&T Bank

Technical details
- Floor count: 3

Design and construction
- Architect: Green & Wicks

The Buffalo Savings Bank is a neoclassical, Beaux-Arts style bank branch building located at 1 Fountain Plaza in downtown Buffalo, New York.

== History ==
The Buffalo Savings Bank building opened in May 1901. The building's signature feature is the gold-leafed dome, which measures 23 feet tall and 56 feet in diameter. It is covered with 13,500 terra-cotta tiles. The tiles originally were overlaid with copper, which took on a greenish hue. The tiles have been gilded three times. The last restoration required 140,000 paper-thin sheets of 23.75-carat gold leaf at a cost $500,000 (more than the initial cost of the building). The building contains a 9-foot (2.7 m) clock above the main columned entrance. In 1983, the original bank building received a larger linked addition on the north side called M & T Center (not to be confused with One M&T Plaza). In 1991, the Buffalo Savings Bank company became insolvent and was dissolved. The building currently serves as a branch of M&T Bank and has been designated a City of Buffalo Landmark.

10 and 12 Fountain Plaza, 40 and 50 Fountain Plaza are across Main Street from the building. The Electric Tower is to the southeast.

In 2010, the bank was used in the filming of Henry's Crime, a movie in which the bank is robbed.

== Gallery ==
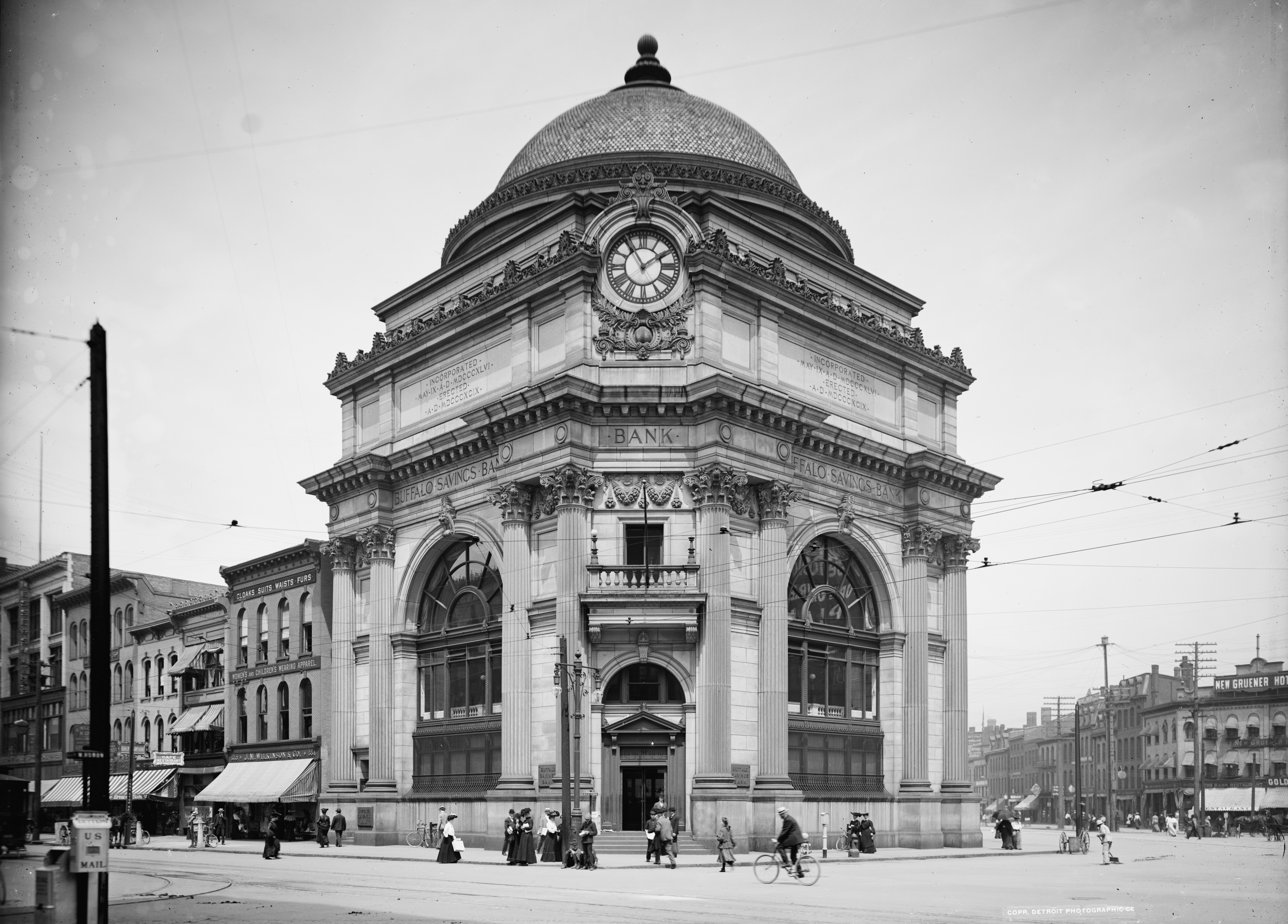
The bank in 1904

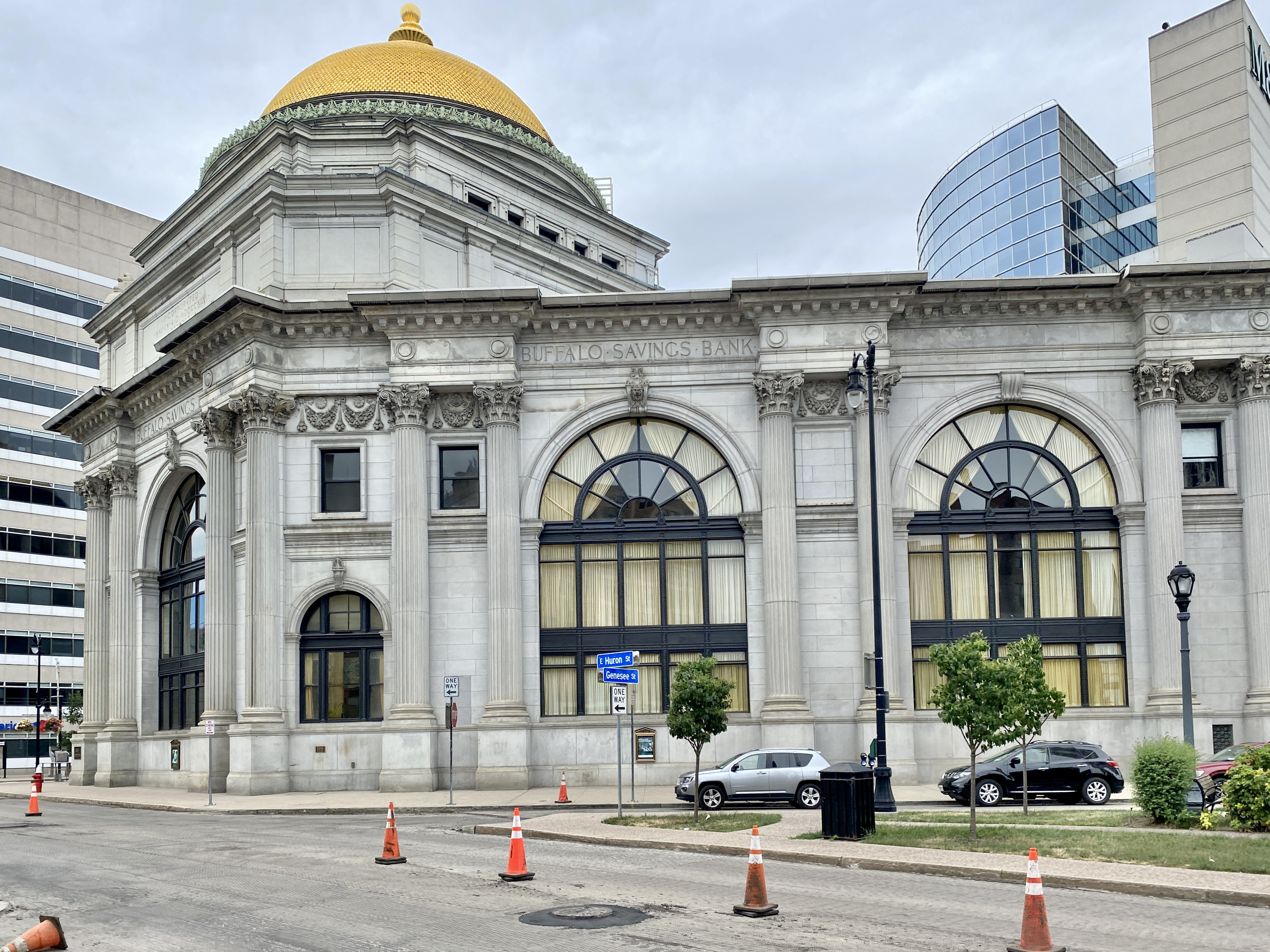
Facade details

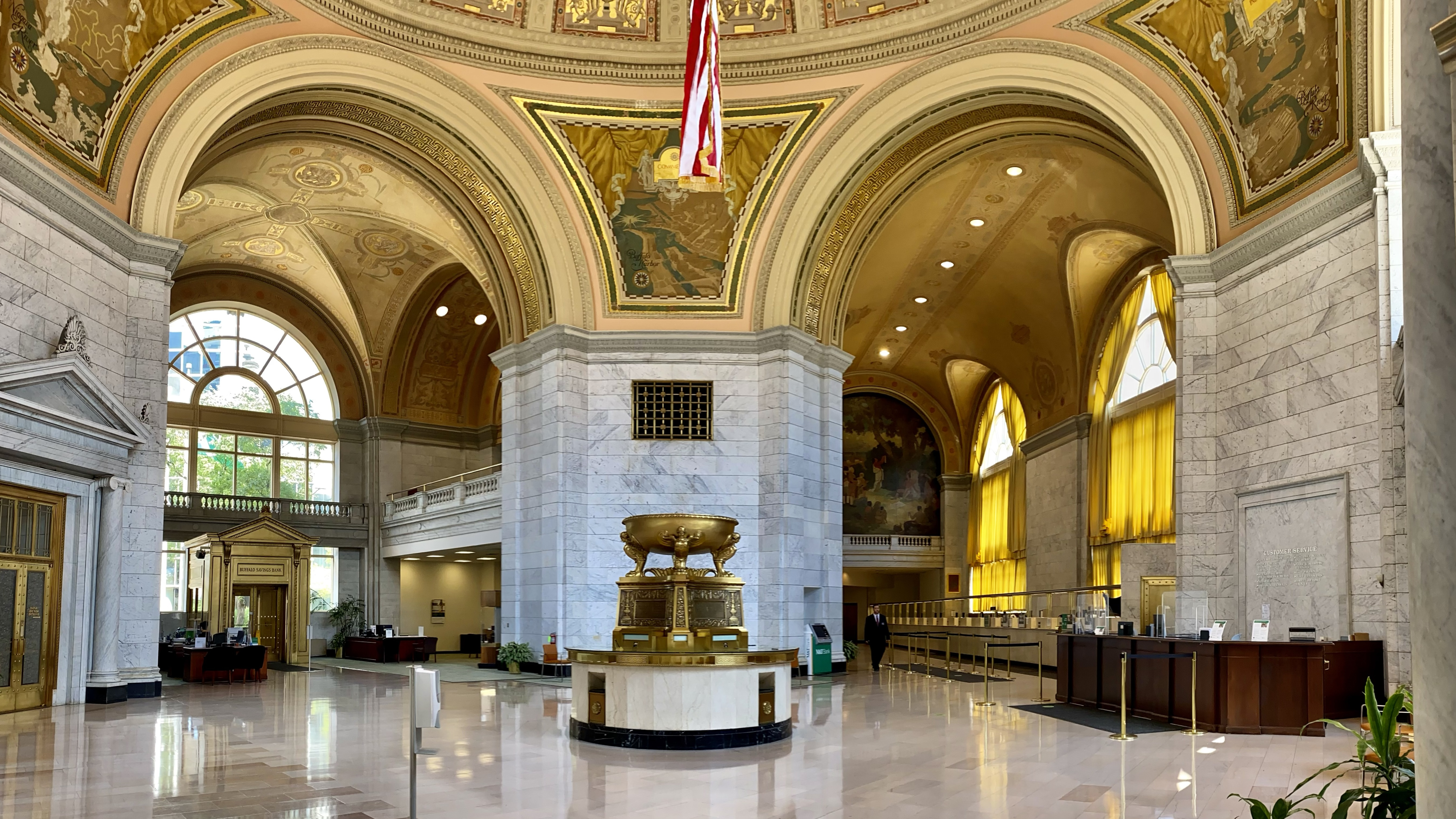
Main banking hall

== See also ==
- Green & Wicks
