= Aaron Li-Hill =

Canadian visual artist and muralist based in Brooklyn

Aaron Li-Hill (born 1986) is a Canadian visual artist and muralist based in Brooklyn. Li-Hill is known for his large-scale murals, kinetic installations and movement-based visual work.

== Career ==
Li-Hill possesses a BFA from the Ontario College of Art and Design University.

Li-Hill’s work has been showcased in cities such as Melbourne, New York, San Francisco, LA Berlin, Hong Kong. and Grenoble He has also had works displayed in major institutions such as the National Gallery of Victoria, The Art Gallery of Ontario, the Portsmouth Museum of Art in New Hampshire and the Honolulu Museum of Art

In 2018 Li-Hill was invited to Delhi by the Canadian Embassy and St+Art India to be a representative Canadian artist for Prime Minister Justin Trudeau’s last diplomatic visit to India.

Li-Hill held a solo show in Brooklyn, New York entitled "Perils of a New World", which focused on the theme of humanity’s relation to the natural world and the global climate crisis.

== Exhibitions ==
2020

- Winter Group Show, Vertical Gallery, Chicago, USA

2019

- ‘Perils of a New World’, The Hall Brooklyn, NYC, USA
- ‘UN-derstand The Power of Art as a Social Architect’, Urban Nation Museum, Berlin, Germany
- The Molskine Project V2, Spoke Art, San Francisco, USA
- ‘Ataraxia’, Mirus Gallery, San Francisco, USA
- 'Meet Me at Delancey' & Essex, Spoke Gallery, NYC, USA
- 'East Meets West', Corey Helford Gallery, LA, USA

2017

- 'Heist', Juddy Roller Gallery, Melbourne, Australia
- Urban Nation Museum Opening, Urban Nation Museum, Berlin, Germany
- 'From The Streets', Arts Westchester, White Plains, USA

2016

- 'The New Vangaurd', Thinkspace Gallery, Lancaster Museum of Art, USA
- 'Out of Line', Subliminal Projects, LA, USA
- 'Exploring the New Contemporary Movement', Thinkspace Gallery, Honolulu Museum of Art, Honolulu, USA
- 'Entry Point', Thinkspace Gallery, Fullerton Museum Center, USA

2015

- 'Brotherhood', Jonathan Levine Gallery, NYC, USA

2014

- Scope Art Fair, C.A.V.E. Gallery, Miami, USA

2013

- AWOL CREW Presents: FABRIC, Melbourne, Australia

== Public Projects ==
2020

- Gillett Square, London, England

2019

- ‘Perilous Journey in a Changing World’ large scale installation on Governor’s Island for Portal Art Fair, NYC, USA
- ‘Process of Acceleration’ large scale mural Grenoble, France

2018

- ‘Ilmatar’, Large-scale mural with Helsinki Urban Art, Helsinki, Finland
- ‘Nature’s Arch and Altered Landscapes’, Large-scale mural with the Canadian Embassy and St+Art India, New Delhi, India
- 'Apparition of the Past', Large-scale mural with St.Art, NYC, USA

2017

- The RAW Project: Denver, Large-scale mural with Fairview Elementary School, Denver, USA
- ‘In Pursuit of Peace’, Large-scale mural with Vapnaagard Tunnel Project, Helsingør, Denmark
- ‘Monuments’, Large-scale installation with MURAL festival, Montreal, Canada
- ‘On the Brink’, Large-scale mural with Pangeaseed/ Seawalls, Churchill, Canada
- Awareness: Mural For The People of Tibet, Collaborative mural with Adnate for Bushwick collective, Brooklyn, USA

2016

- ‘Protective Pack’, Large-scale mural with Weart, Aalborg, Denmark
- ‘Guns, Germs and Steel’, Large-scale installation for 2nd annual Street Art Biennale, Moscow, Russia
- ‘Impact of Discovery’, Large-scale mural with Mural Social Club, Kyiv, Ukraine
- ‘Sword Dance’, Mural with Vaford Gates project, Hong Kong, China
- ‘Hunter and Hunted’, Mural with Artesano Project, Nagua, Dominican Republic
- ‘Radioactive Cascade’, Collaborative Mural with James Bullough, with Urban Nation and Pangeaseed, Miami, USA
- COP21 AD Take Over, Participant in citywide ad takeover with Brandalism project, Paris, France

2015

- ‘Deacon of Dark River’, Large-scale Mural for Wall Poetry festival, Reykjavik, Iceland
- ‘Rise and Fall’, Large-scale mural with Urban Nation Berlin, Berlin, Germany
- ‘Together We Fall’, Large Scale Mural at Wall Therapy Mural Festival, Rochester, USA
- ‘In Pursuit of Prosperity’, Installation at 88 East Broadway, NYC, USA
