= Frank X. Bernhardt =

American businessman and politician

Frank X. Bernhardt (January 23, 1858 – June 13, 1937) was an American businessman and politician from New York.

== Life ==
Bernhardt was born on January 23, 1858, in Buffalo, New York, the son of Aloys Bernhardt and Martina Hoffman. His father died in 1864, while fighting in the American Civil War.

Bernhardt initially attended public school and St. Ann's parochial school, but after his father's death he left school and began working. In 1880, he started working in the saloon business. Eight years later, he opened Hotel Bernhardt. He later entered the wholesale wine and liquor trade and opened the Postoffice Garage, one of the first public garages in Buffalo. After Prohibition began, he retired from business to focus on his political career and the Fraternal Order of Eagles. He was a prominent member of the Eagles, serving as charter and life member of his local aerie, president of the Buffalo and New York aeries, a grand trustee of the grand lodge, head of the state's old age pension committee, and the installation officer.

In the 1906 United States House of Representatives election, Bernhardt was the Republican candidate for New York's 35th congressional district. He lost the election to William H. Ryan. In 1924, he was elected to the New York State Assembly as a Republican, representing the Erie County 3rd District. He served in the Assembly in 1925, 1926, 1927, 1928, 1929, 1930, 1931, 1932, 1933, 1934, and 1936. While in the Assembly, he focused on social welfare legislation. He was known as the father of New York's old age pension system. He wrote a law that abolished the terms "poorhouse" and "almshouse" and ended the practice of permitting births in them. In 1926, he created and headed a special joint legislative welfare committee to investigate conditions in public charitable institutions, and after investigating institutions in each county the committee passed a number of reforms. He also sponsored a number of labor measures, including setting minimum wages for women and children.

Bernhardt was active in several Roman Catholic churches, including St. Michaels which he attended, St. Louis, and St. Mary where he was baptized. He was married three times, marrying his third wife Mary Finnegan in 1912.

Bernhardt died at home from heart disease on June 13, 1937. He was buried in the French and German Roman Catholic Cemetery in Pine Hill.

New York State Assembly
Preceded by Charles D. Stickney	New York State Assembly; Erie County, 3rd District; 1925–1934	Succeeded by Bert Fischer
Preceded by Bert Fischer	New York State Assembly; Erie County, 3rd District; 1936	Succeeded by Fred Hammer
