= Bushwick Collective =

Outdoor art gallery in Bushwick, USA

The Bushwick Collective is an outdoor art gallery and collective in Bushwick, New York. It is located at Troutman Street and St. Nicholas Avenue.

It was established in 2012 after a neighbourhood resident donated his wall, and coordinated with other local building owners to provide empty walls for street artists. Artists that have contributed to the walls include Buff Monster, ND'A, Phlegm, Reka, Blek le Rat, and Olek.

The collective organises an annual concert around its murals, called the 'Bushwick Collective Block Party'. In 2023, the 12th annual block party included Ice-T and Dres. In past years, performers have included Ghostface Killah and KRS-One.

In 2018 the collective hosted a block party in Melbourne, Australia, as part of the MEL&NYC festival.
