= Lyndon B. Johnson Apartments =

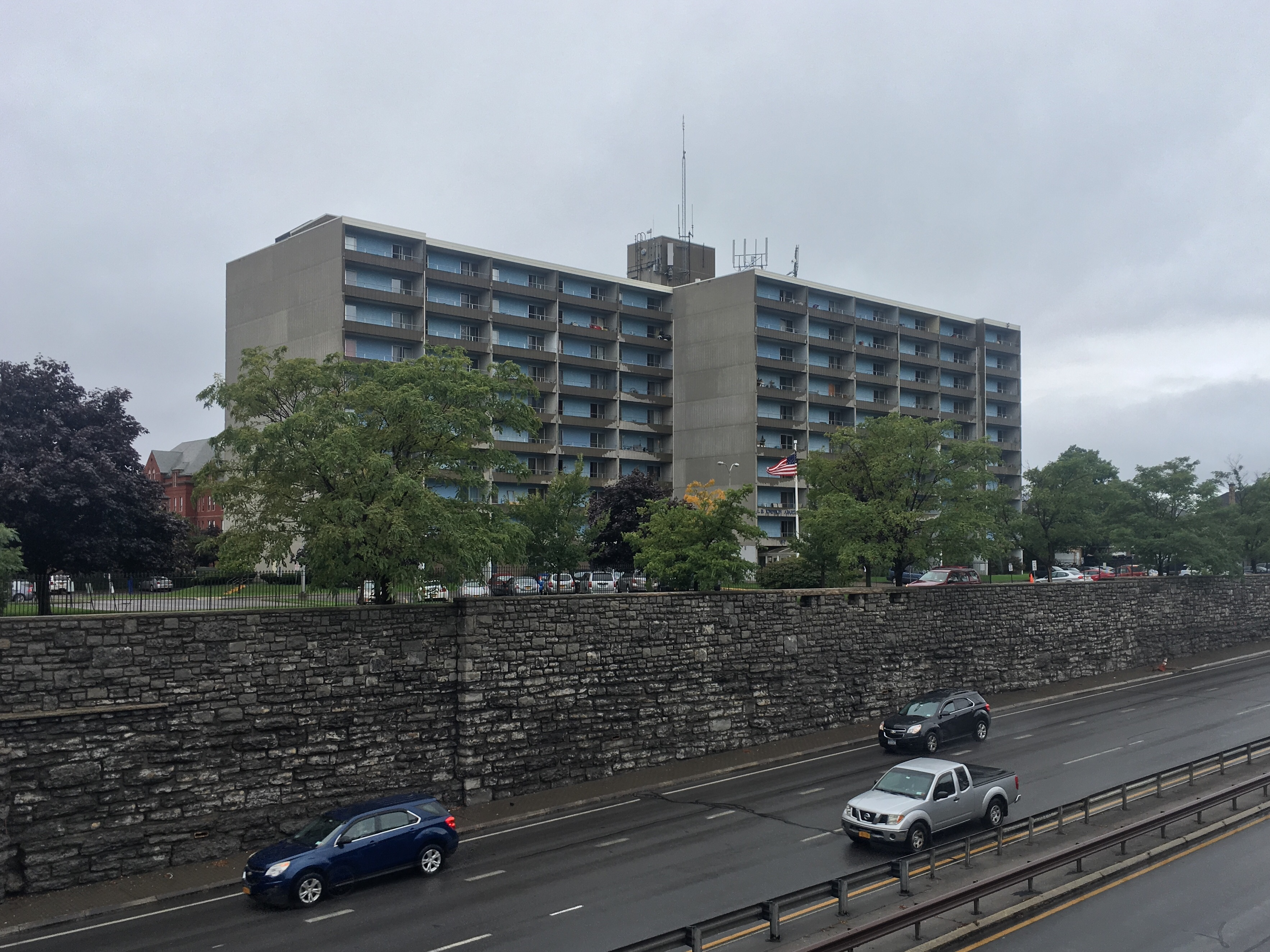
- The apartments in 2019
- Alternative names: LBJ Apartments

General information
- Status: Open
- Address: 167 Humboldt Pkwy
- Town or city: Buffalo, New York
- Country: United States
- Coordinates: 42°55′40.57″N 78°51′9.23″W

Lyndon B. Johnson Apartments also known as LBJ Apartments is a 10-story apartment building that was built in 1973 in Buffalo, New York and is currently a senior apartment center. The building is currently owned by the Buffalo Municipal Housing Authority.

== History ==
The Lyndon B. Johnson Apartments was built in 1973 as a 10-story tall apartment unit with 206 units inside the building in Buffalo.

During the December 2022 North American winter storm the power was shut down in the building due to the storm. Due to the power outage, a 91-year-old woman named Doris Williams froze to death. After the death of Doris Williams, the daughter of her sued the Buffalo Municipal Housing Authority citing wrongful death and other claims of mismanagement of the building.

In August, 2023, a large 10-story tall mural was made on the side of the building. The mural was created by Aaron Li-Hill.
