= Old Post Office (Buffalo, New York) =

Historic post office building in New York, United States

- U.S. Post Office
- U.S. National Register of Historic Places
- New York State Register of Historic Places
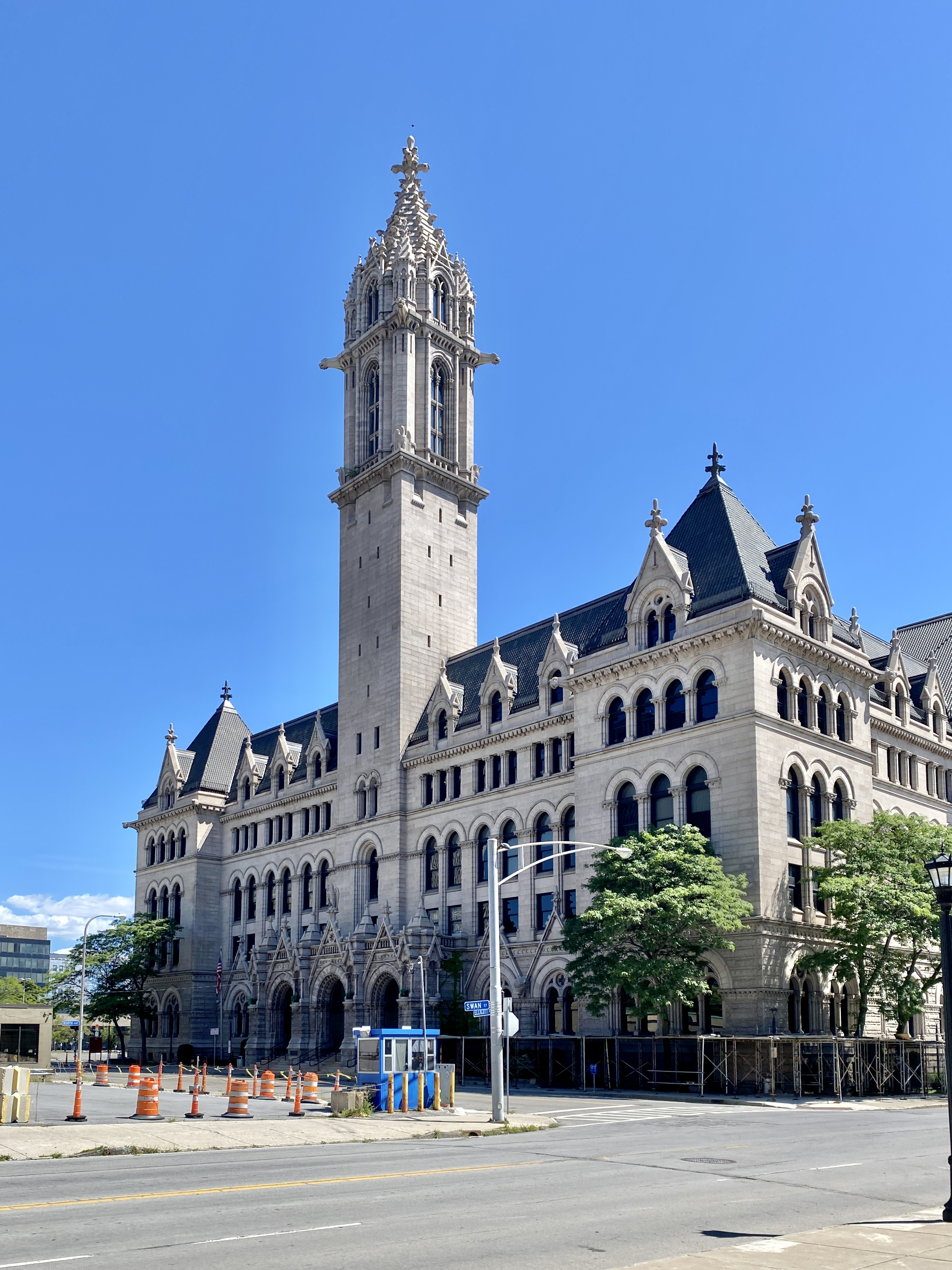
- The building in 2022
- Interactive map showing the location of the Old Post Office in Buffalo
- Location: 121 Ellicott Street, Buffalo, New York
- Coordinates: 42°52′53″N 78°52′22″W
- Built: 1897
- Architects: Taylor, James Knox
- Architectural style: Gothic
- NRHP reference No.: 72000839
- NYSRHP No.: 02940.002990

Significant dates
- Added to NRHP: March 16, 1972
- Designated NYSRHP: June 23, 1980

The Old Post Office, also known as U.S. Post Office, is a historic post office building located at 121 Ellicott Street in Buffalo in Erie County, New York within the Joseph Ellicott Historic District. It is currently home to the City Campus of SUNY Erie.

== History ==
It was designed by the Office of the Supervising Architect of the old U.S. Post Office Department during the tenure of Jeremiah O'Rourke when construction started in 1897. The $1.5 million building opened in 1901 during the tenure of James Knox Taylor and operated as Buffalo's central post office until 1963.

The highly ornamented Gothic Revival style four-story building features a 244 feet (74 m) tall tower over the central entrance. Other key architectural details of the building include recessed arches, projecting gargoyles, and a green Ludowici tile roof.

The main feature of the interior is a roofed courtyard. It was subsequently occupied by various federal offices.

The structure was listed on the National Register of Historic Places maintained by the National Park Service of the U.S. Department of the Interior in 1972 as "U.S. Post Office".

Since 1981, it has been home to the City Campus of SUNY Erie. Burt Flickinger Center is across the street and provides athletic facilities for the college.

== Gallery ==
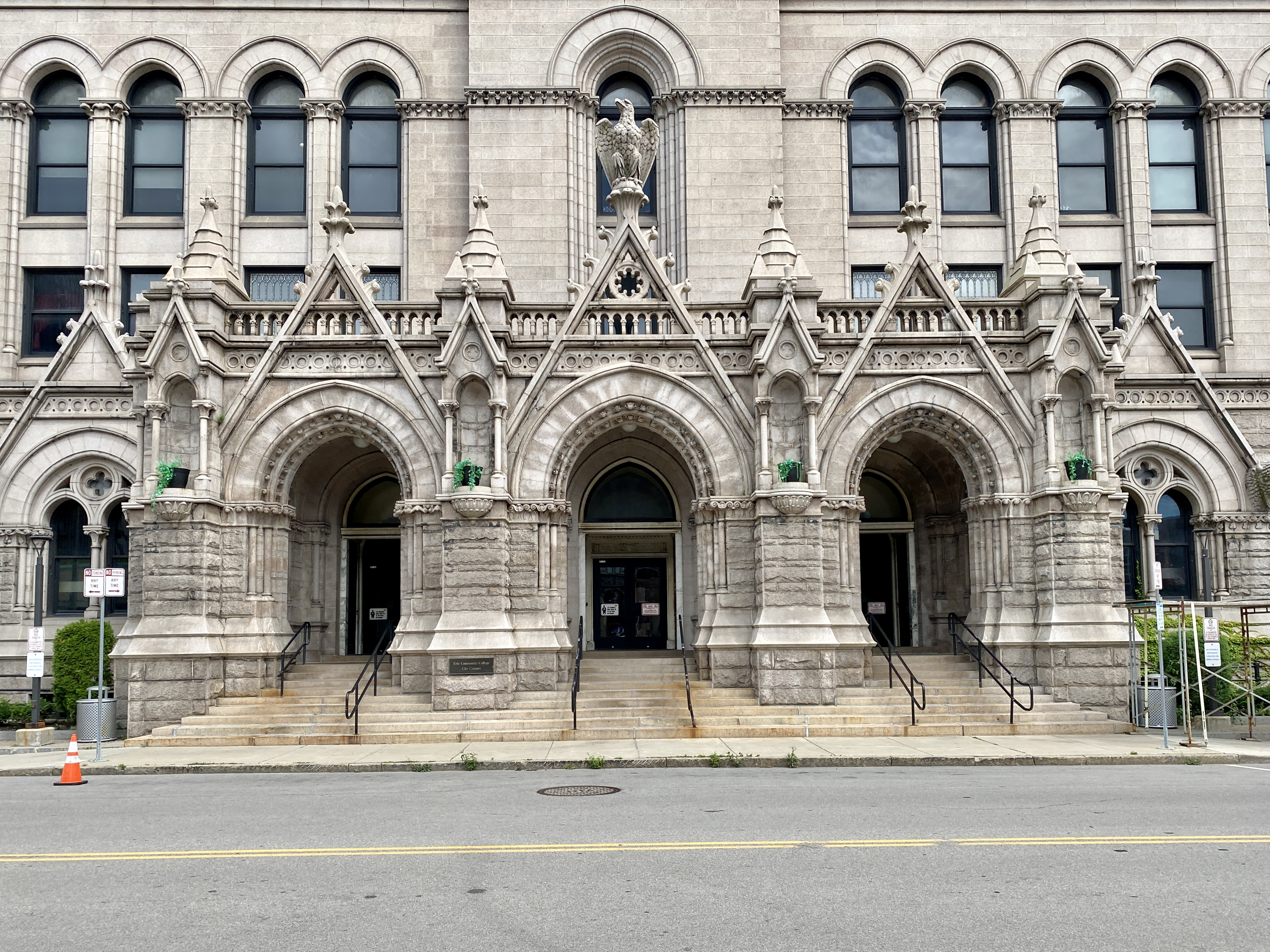
West (main) entrance

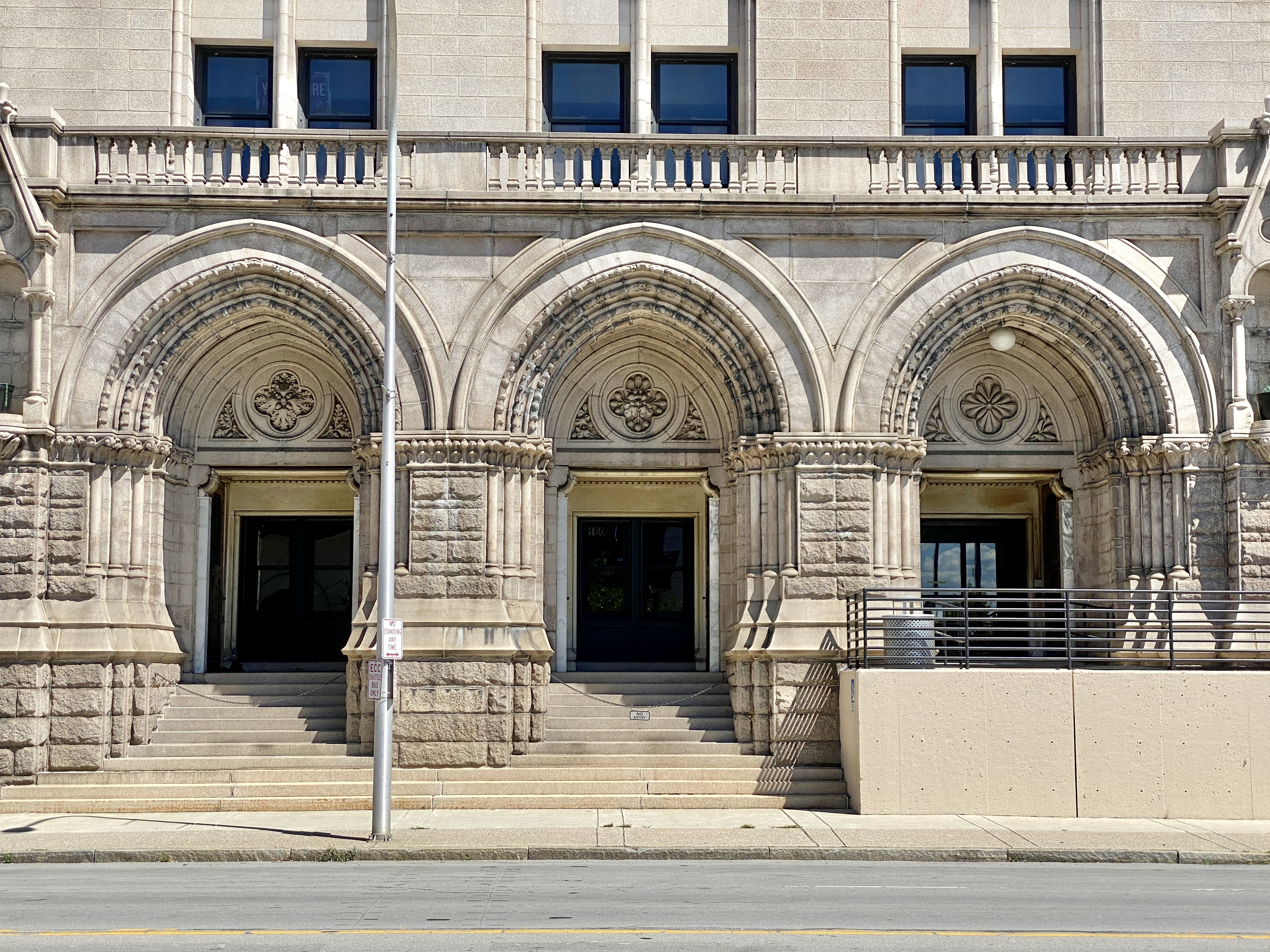
South entrance

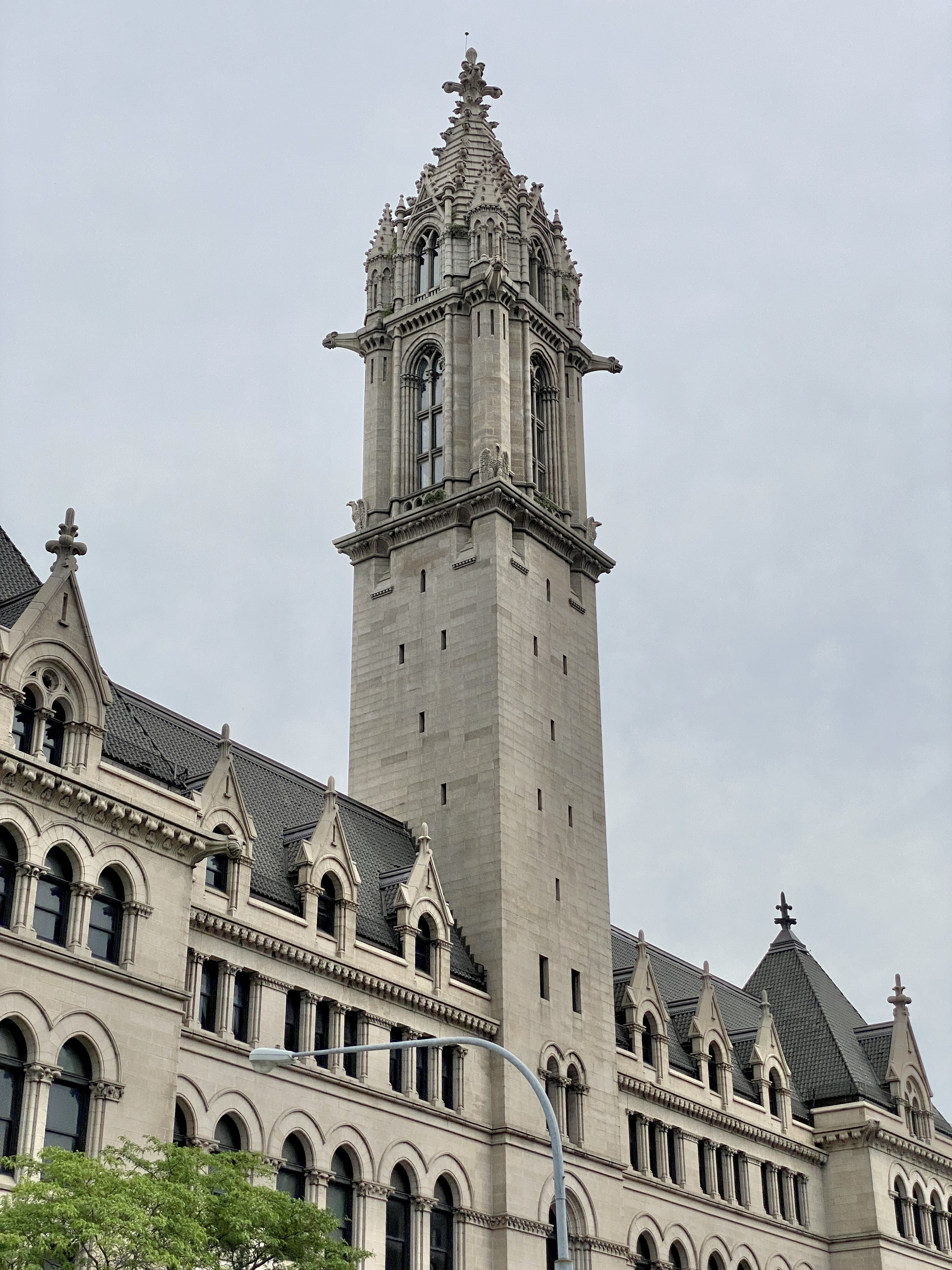
Tower

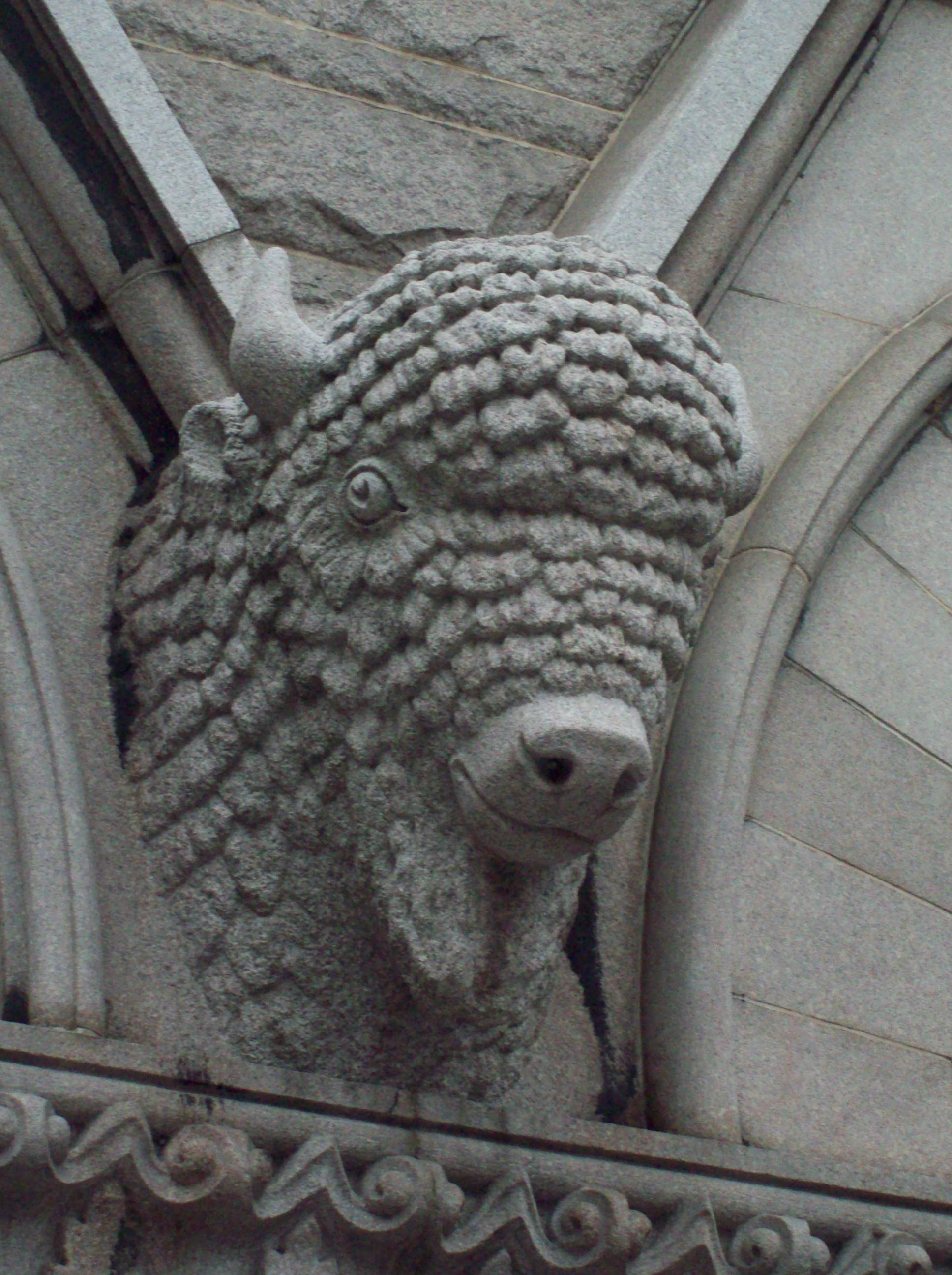
Ornamentation

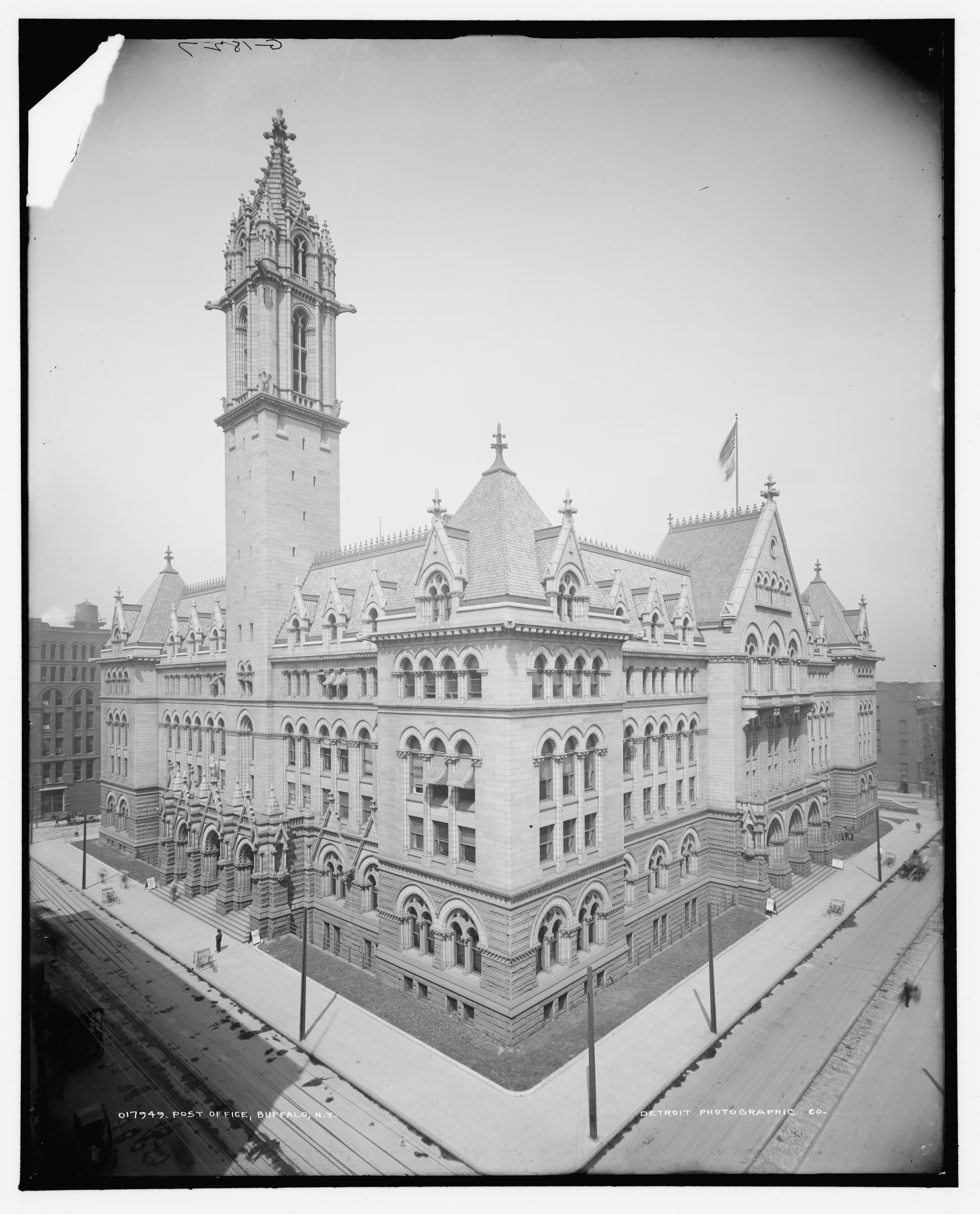
C. 1900-1906

== See also ==
- List of tallest buildings in Buffalo, New York

Preceded by Guaranty Building	Tallest building in Buffalo; 1901–1912; 74m	Succeeded by Electric Tower
