= Verizon/AT&T Building =

Building in Buffalo, New York

- Former names: The Telephone Company Building; New York Telephone Building

General information
- Status: Completed
- Architectural style: Neo-gothic
- Location: 65 Franklin Street, Buffalo, New York, United States
- Coordinates: 42.883063°N 78.877313°W
- Year built: 1913—1916
- Completed: 1916
- Opened: 1916
- Owner: Verizon New York
- Affiliation: Verizon and AT&T

Height
- Height: 78.4 m / 258 ft

Technical details
- Structural system: High rise
- Floor count: 16

Design and construction
- Architecture firm: HLW International

The Verizon/AT&T building previously known as The Telephone Company Building is a 16 story tall skyscraper in Buffalo, New York that was designed by HLW International.

== History ==
The telephone established itself in 1879 in Buffalo, New York, with the installation of the first telephone in Miller's Livery Stable. The building was originally built in 1913 and completed in 1916 by HLW International, originally called Voorhees Walker Smith & Smith at the time. It was originally used by the New York Telephone (Now Verizon New York) after being taken over by The Bell Telephone Company in Buffalo in 1913 with, in 1930, artistic decoration being added to the building on the outside. The project of the building was funded by New York Telephone with them giving out USD$4,000,000 to fund infrastructure in Buffalo, New York which included the 16 story tall building, with the first call coming from the building being from Buffalo Mayor Louis P. Fuhrmann and Chamber of Commerce president H.A. Meldrum. Frontier, then known as Federal Telephone and Telegraph Company was sold to the New York Telephone company on August 1, 1918 which further expanded the telephone monopoly in Buffalo. In the early 20th century, the city of Buffalo saw significant growth in its telephone infrastructure. Initially, the number of telephones installed in Buffalo was approximately 66,000. This figure increased to 100,000 by 1925 and further expanded to 200,000 by 1947. The central hub for the telecommunication machinery was the Telephone Building. As of 1948, it was reported that the facility housed an extensive network of 909 miles of switchboard cable and 1,200 miles of auxiliary wiring, alongside an aggregate of 2,000,000 pounds of various metals, including iron, copper, and lead. Notably, the upper floors of the building were characterized by the constant sound of clicking switches and circuits, which underscored the bustling activity of the telephone exchange. Verizon Communications invested nearly $7 million in the restoration of the building with the project included replacing over 969 windows, some dating to the early 20th century, restoring the copper parapet, installing new roofs, and repairing the terra cotta, brick, limestone, and other masonry materials. This initiative aimed to address issues such as heat loss, cracks, water damage, and corrosion, with the goal of ensuring the building's preservation for another 30 years.

The building stands at 258 feet (78.4 meters) and has a width of 76 feet (23.1648 meters) that is made of mainly steel with a rigid frame with the façade material being brick terracotta and the façade system being applied masonry multi-wythe exterior, the architectural style is neo-gothic.

=== Building expansions and problems ===
In 1930 the building expanded with an Art Deco style, eight-story wing added. The 1930s addition, known as Building B, features a brick masonry façade adorned with decorative limestone panels on the lower levels and intricate limestone relief bands accentuating the window heads. On the south expansion of Building B, inadequate expansion control led to cracking brick which was a concern by Verizon during the project which it funded in 2018. Building B also expanded with masonry shelf angle which had suffered severe corrosion from insufficient flashing and weeps, leading to rust, which caused the supported brick course to lift and allow moisture infiltration. This moisture, combined with seasonal freeze-thaw cycles, exacerbated the dislocation of the brick veneer. To address these issues in the Verizon project, the brick above the shelf angle was removed, the corroded steel angle cleaned and primed, proper flashing installed, and the brick reinstalled with weep holes at regular intervals. Building C, a five-story vertical addition constructed in three phases atop the original lower level of Building A, also showed signs of brick jacking and an open joint at the parapet on the west elevation, mirroring issues found on the south side. The solution involved exposing and cleaning the shelf angle, priming it, and installing proper flashing and weep holes. The building currently has a mix of window types; about 30% of the original masonry openings still house steel frame wire glass windows, while the rest have mid-1980s aluminum replacement windows or aluminum and steel mechanical louvers. The original windows, produced by S.H. Pomeroy, were double-hung, single-glazed units with steel frames, whereas the 1980s replacements from Graham Architectural Products feature double-glazed, offset fixed designs with true divided lites and aluminum frames.

== See also ==
- List of tallest buildings in Buffalo, New York
