= Charles D. Stickney =

American politician

Member of the New York State Assembly for Erie County
- In office 1924–1924
- Preceded by: August Seelbach
- Succeeded by: Frank X. Bernhardt

Personal details
- Born: Charles D. Stickney; 1857 Holland, New York, U.S.
- Died: March 2, 1924 (aged 66–67) Buffalo, New York, U.S.
- Party: Republican
- Spouse: Ida Mary West (m. 1882)
- Children: Pearl Stickney Bartz
- Education: Ten Broeck Academy

Charles D. Stickney (1857 – March 2, 1924) was an American lawyer and Republican politician from New York.

== Early life ==
Stickney was born in Holland, New York and was descended from an old English family that settled in Massachusetts in 1637 and moved to New York State early in the 1800s.

He was educated at the Ten Broeck Academy in Franklinville before studying law with Judges Spring, Cortell and Hatch. He was admitted to the bar in 1882.

== Career ==
He was Clerk of the Board of Supervisors of Erie County in 1888. Later he was an attorney for the New York State Tax Department; and a U.S. Commissioner for Deeds in and for the City of Buffalo. After many years of service, he resigned his federal commissionership in the fall of 1923 to run for the State Assembly.

Stickney was elected and served as a member of the New York State Assembly, representing Erie County's third district, in the 147th New York State Legislature in 1924. After his death, the Assembly paid tribute to him by draping his desk in black and adjourning on motion of the Speaker Machold.

== Personal life ==
In 1882, Stickney was married to Ida Mary West (1858–1928) of West Valley. Together, they were the parents of a daughter, Pearl Stickney, who married Edward J. Bartz.

Stickney died on March 2, 1924, after a major operation. After his funeral at the home of his daughter in Viola Park. "A note he left said that he wished his ashes to be scattered where the sun shines and the flowers bloom." A memorial was placed at Forest Lawn Cemetery, Buffalo.

New York State Assembly
Preceded by August Seelbach	New York State Assembly; Erie County, 3rd District; 1924	Succeeded by Frank X. Bernhardt
