= The RAW Project =

Nonprofit school mural initiative founded in Miami in 2014

- Abbreviation: RAW
- Formation: 2014
- Type: Nonprofit organization
- Purpose: School-based public art and arts engagement
- Headquarters: Miami, Florida, U.S.
- Region served: United States
- Website: www.therawproject.org

The RAW Project (acronym for Re-imagining Arts Worldwide) is a nonprofit arts initiative in the United States that commissions murals on public school campuses and facilitates student workshops with visiting artists. Established in Miami in 2014, its first large campaign covered José de Diego Middle School in Wynwood with dozens of murals during Miami Art Week. Subsequent projects have taken place at additional Miami schools and, beginning in 2017, at schools in Denver.

== History ==
The project began in 2014 in Miami’s Wynwood neighborhood, where artists were invited to paint the walls of José de Diego Middle School, a campus then lacking an arts program. Media coverage described the school’s transformation and later integration of art into the curriculum.

The initiative expanded to Eneida M. Hartner Elementary in 2016 and returned for a repaint in 2019 that included contributions by Shepard Fairey and other artists. A further campaign took place at South Miami K–8 Center in 2019, and in 2022 murals were added at Dr. Henry W. Mack/West Little River K–8 Center.

In 2017 RAW expanded to Denver through a partnership with the city’s Urban Arts Fund. Projects at Eagleton, Cowell and Fairview Elementary schools were followed in 2018 by murals at Garden Place and Cheltenham Elementary.

== Programs and activities ==
RAW commissions exterior and interior murals on school buildings and organizes artist interactions such as assemblies, classroom workshops and campus tours.

== Reception ==
NPR reported in 2016 that José de Diego Middle School’s principal credited the murals with improving enrollment and school climate. Coverage in the Miami Herald, Miami New Times, NBC 6, and Westword documented the project’s development and its visibility during Miami Art Week.

== Organization ==
The project is based in Miami, Florida. Founders Robert de los Rios and Audrey Sykes have been identified in press coverage as initiators of the program.

== See also ==
- Wynwood Art District
- Public art
