= MEL&NYC festival =

2018 cultural festival in Melbourne, AU

MEL&NYC festival was a cultural festival in Melbourne, Australia in 2018.

It was sponsored by the Victorian Government, and involved community programming from various Australian arts organisations.

Noteworthy performers at the festival included Ilana Glazer, Ronan Farrow, and Momofuku.

State tourism Martin Foley was involved in organising the event.
