= 40 Fountain Plaza =

Building in Buffalo, New York, United States

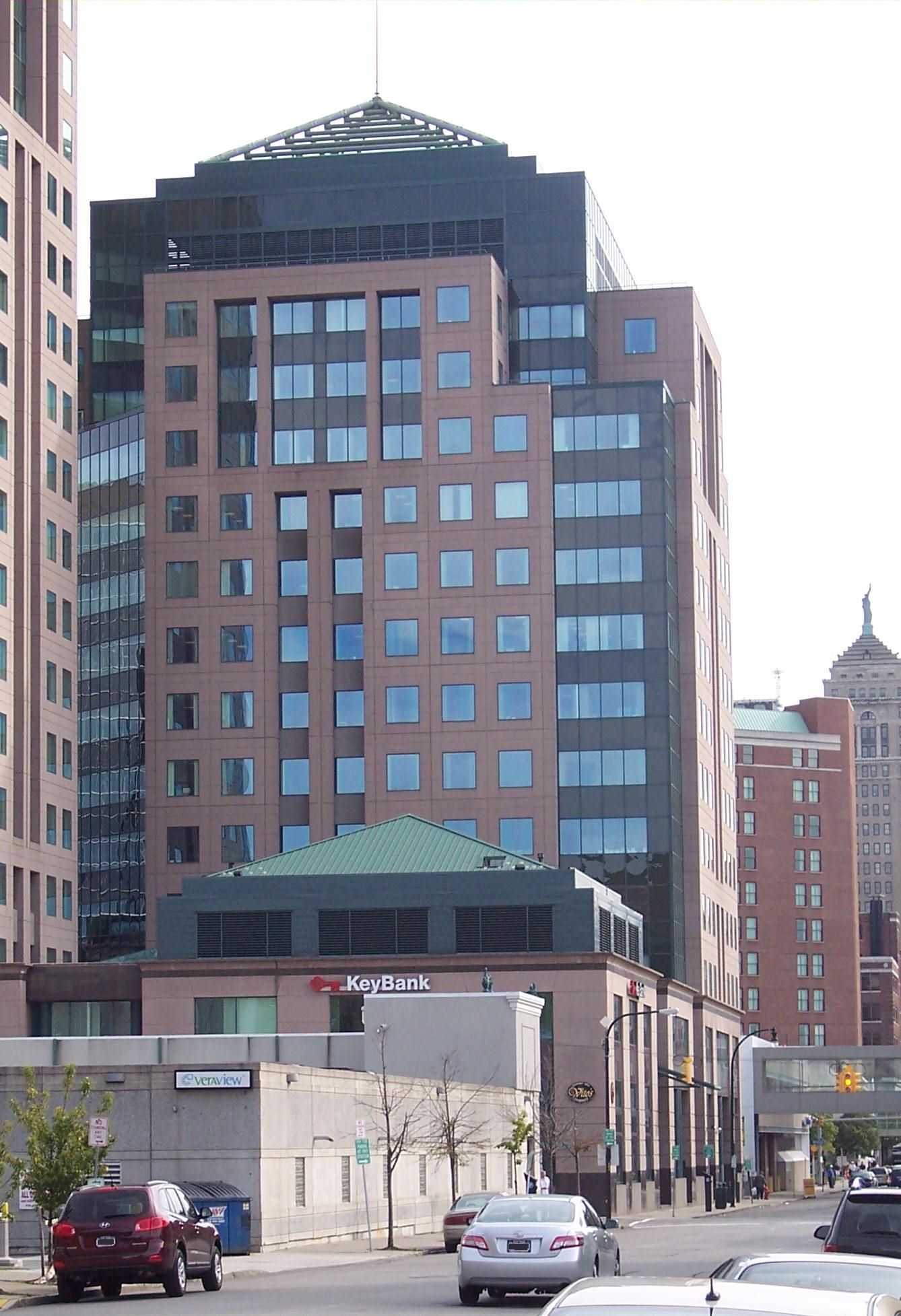
- 40 Fountain Plaza, in Buffalo, NY
- Interactive map of the 40 Fountain Plaza area

General information
- Status: Completed
- Type: Office
- Location: 40 Fountain Plaza, Buffalo, NY, United States
- Coordinates: 42°53′22.5″N 78°52′26″W
- Completed: 1990
- Owner: Anthill US Inc [a subsidiary of Odoo SA]
- Management: Ciminelli Group

Height
- Roof: 225 feet (68.6 m)

Technical details
- Floor count: 13
- Floor area: 157,700 sq ft (14,650.8 m^{2})
- Lifts/elevators: 5

Design and construction
- Architect: Brisbin Brook Beynon Architects
- Developer: CitiPark/CitiComm

40 Fountain Plaza, formerly Key Center South Tower, is a high-rise located in Buffalo, NY. It stands 225 feet (69 m) and 13 stories tall. The building has a twin tower next door, 50 Fountain Plaza (formerly Key Center North Tower), which is four stories taller, and connected by a two-story glass atrium encompassing 18,800 square feet of retail space. The complex was formally known as the Key Center at Fountain Plaza. Both buildings have distinctive pyramid tops that are trimmed with LED lighting strips which are illuminated at night and can change color for specific occasions or holidays. In the front of the two towers is a large fountain and reflecting pool in the summer. In the winter, it serves as an outdoor ice rink that is free to the public.

== Tenants ==
In June 2014, it was announced that IBM's new software research facility will become the primary tenant of the Fountain Plaza South Tower, taking up most of the 100,000-square-feet space Delaware North vacated upon moving to the Delaware North Building.

== Gallery ==
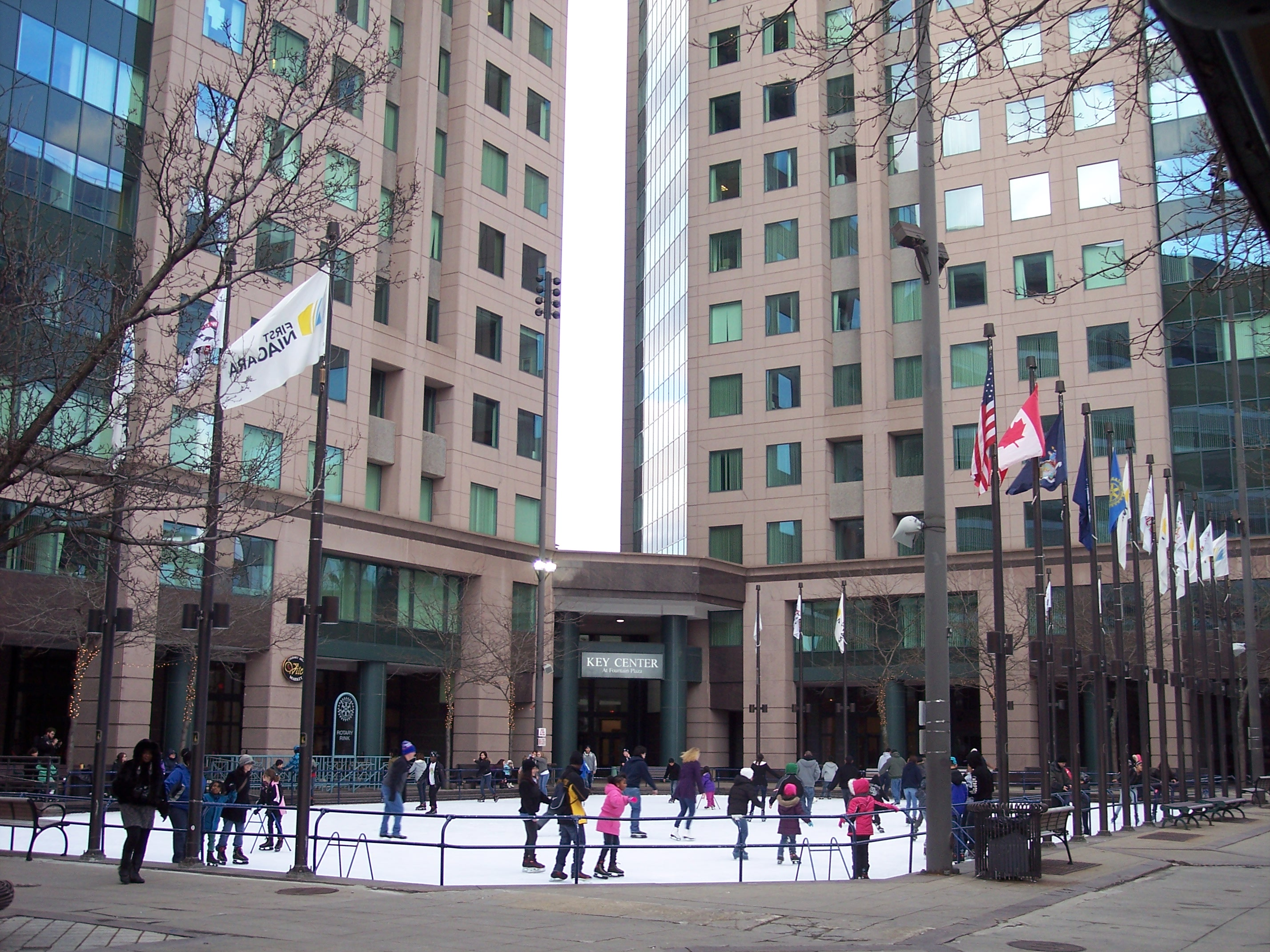
Rotary Rink at Fountain Plaza

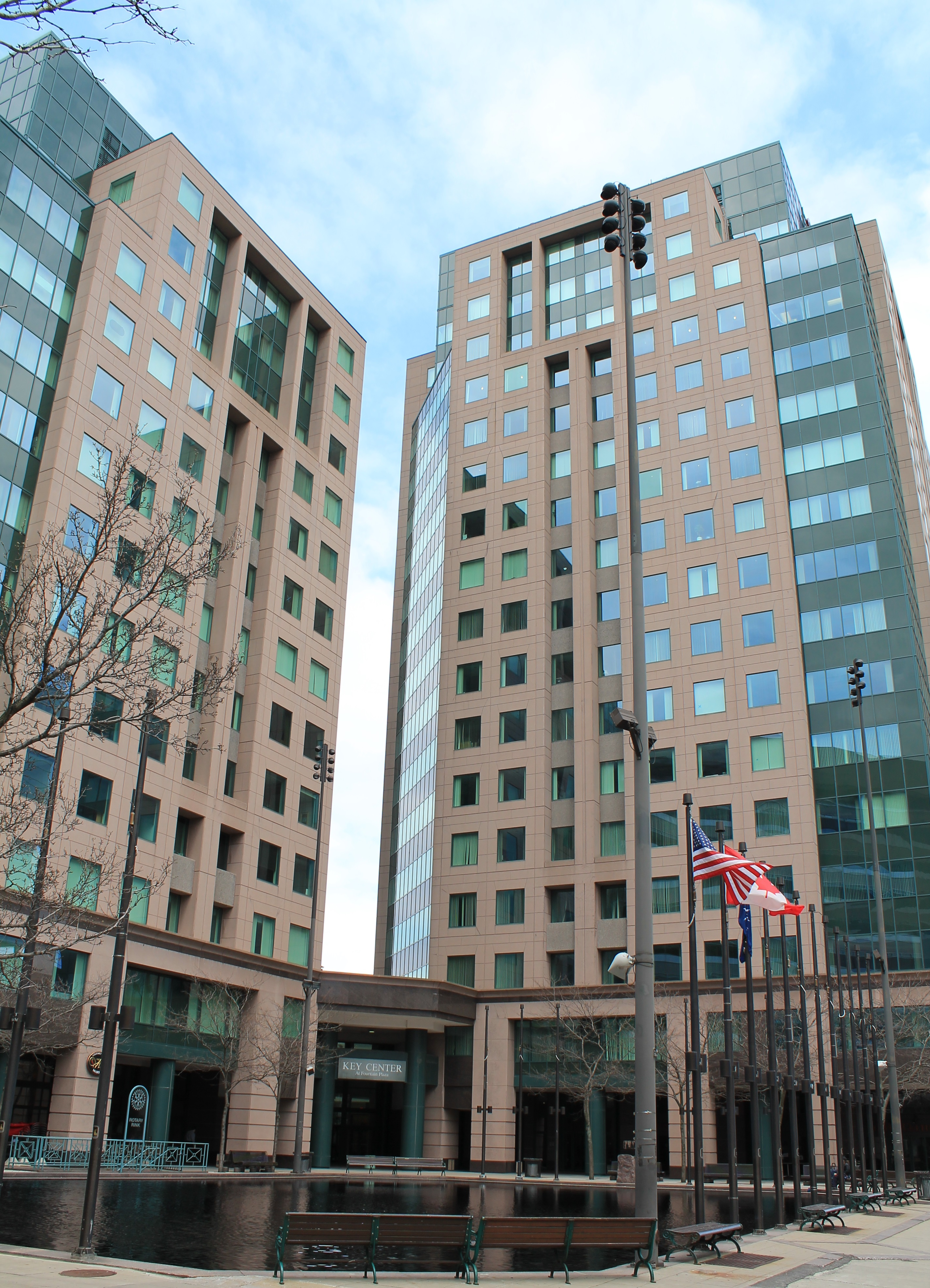
The plaza in spring

== See also ==
- List of tallest buildings in Buffalo, New York
