= 50 Fountain Plaza =

Building in Buffalo, New York, United States

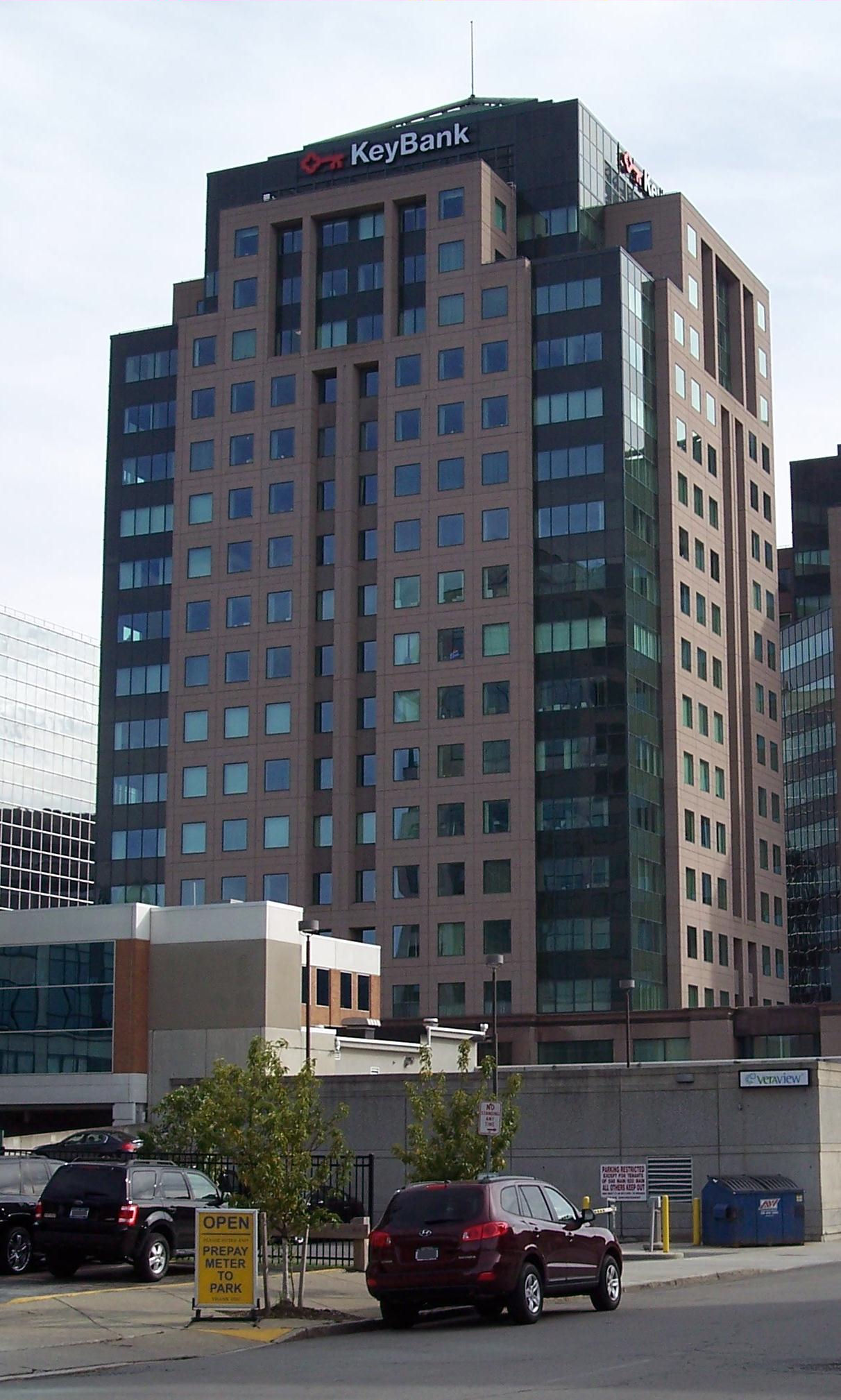
- Key Center North Tower, in Buffalo, NY
- Interactive map of the 50 Fountain Plaza area

General information
- Status: Completed
- Type: Office
- Location: 50 Fountain Plaza, Buffalo, NY, United States
- Coordinates: 42°53′23.5″N 78°52′24″W
- Completed: 1990
- Owner: Key Success LLC
- Operator: Ciminelli Group

Height
- Roof: 275 feet (83.8 m)

Technical details
- Floor count: 17
- Floor area: 273,260 sq ft (25,386.7 m^{2})
- Lifts/elevators: 5

Design and construction
- Architect: Brisbin Brook Beynon Architects
- Developer: CitiPark/CitiComm

50 Fountain Plaza, formerly the Key Center North Tower, is a high-rise located in Buffalo, New York, USA. It is the eighth tallest building in Buffalo at 275 feet (85 m) and 17 stories tall. The building has a twin tower next door, 40 Fountain Plaza (formerly Key Center South Tower) which is four stories shorter and connected by a two-story glass atrium encompassing 18,800 square feet of retail space. Once known as the Key Center, the complex is now simply known as Fountain Plaza after KeyBank moved out. Both buildings have distinctive pyramid tops that are trimmed with LED lighting strips which are illuminated at night and can change color for specific occasions or holidays. In the front of the two towers is a large fountain in the summer. In the winter, it serves as an outdoor ice rink that is free to the public.

== Tenants ==
Formerly home to KeyBank's Buffalo operations, the building is home to operations of Labatt Brewing Company's North American breweries sales and marketing and others.

== Gallery ==
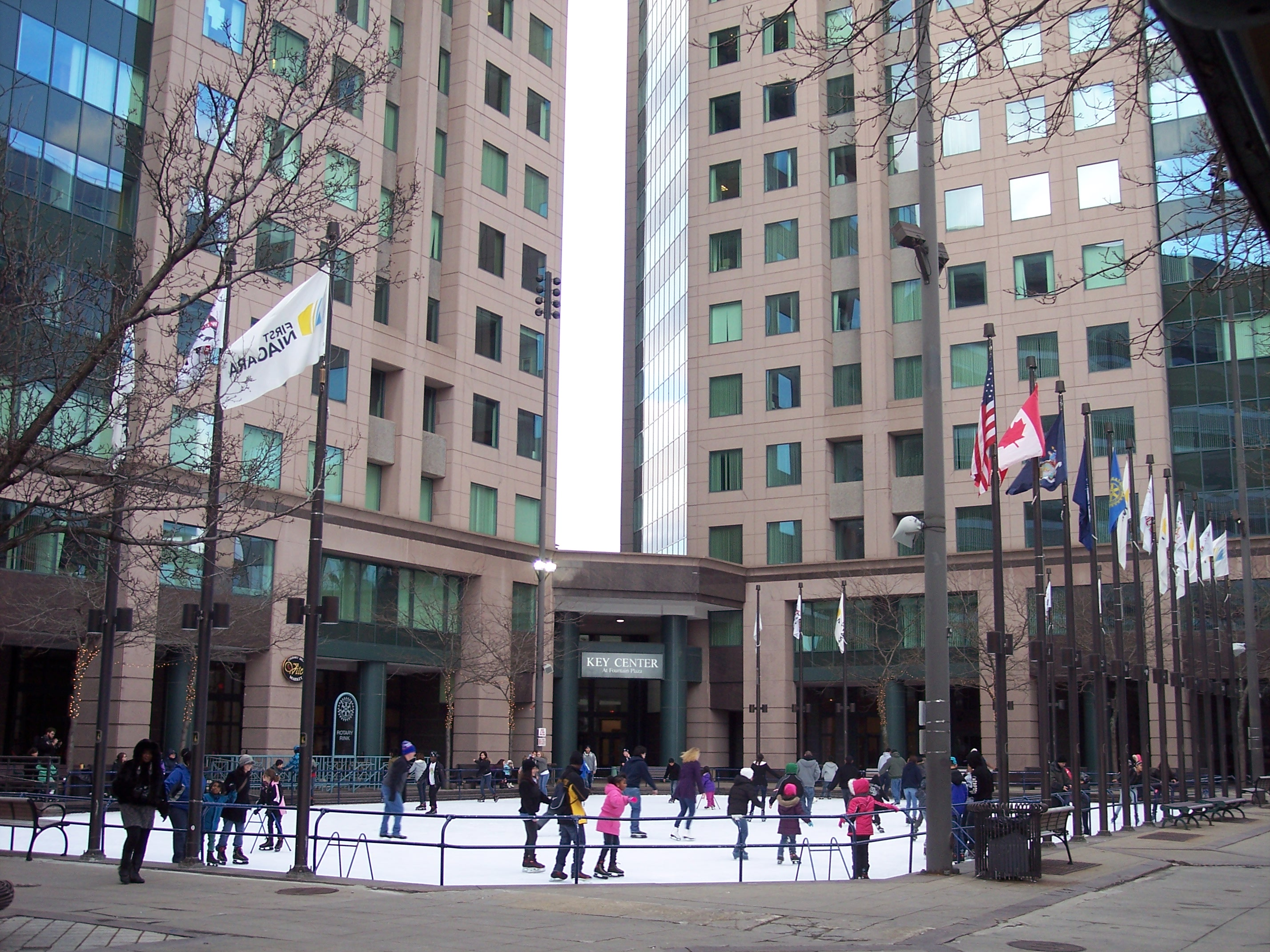
Rotary Rink at Fountain Plaza, February 2012

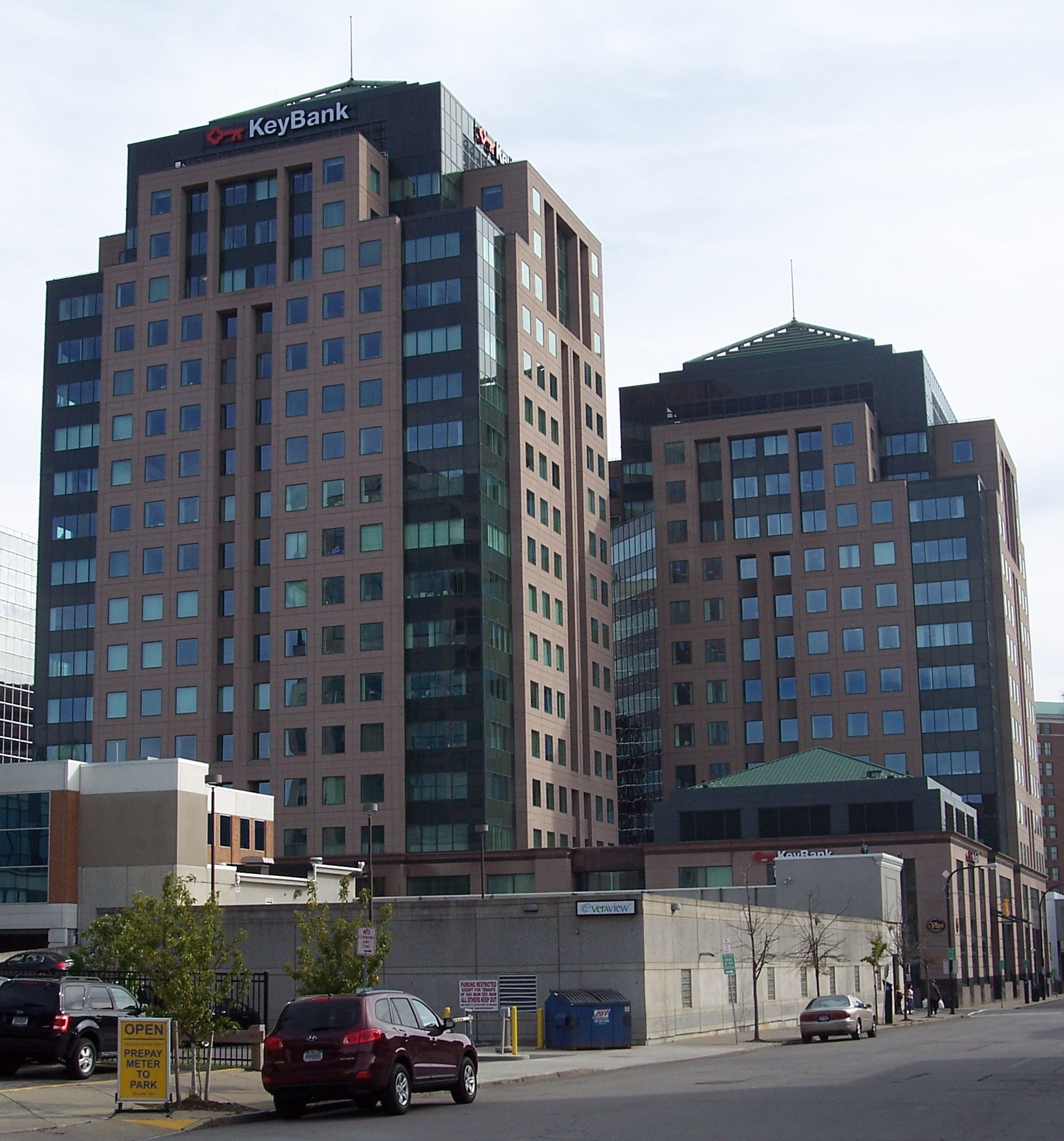
Key Center at Fountain Plaza, September 2010

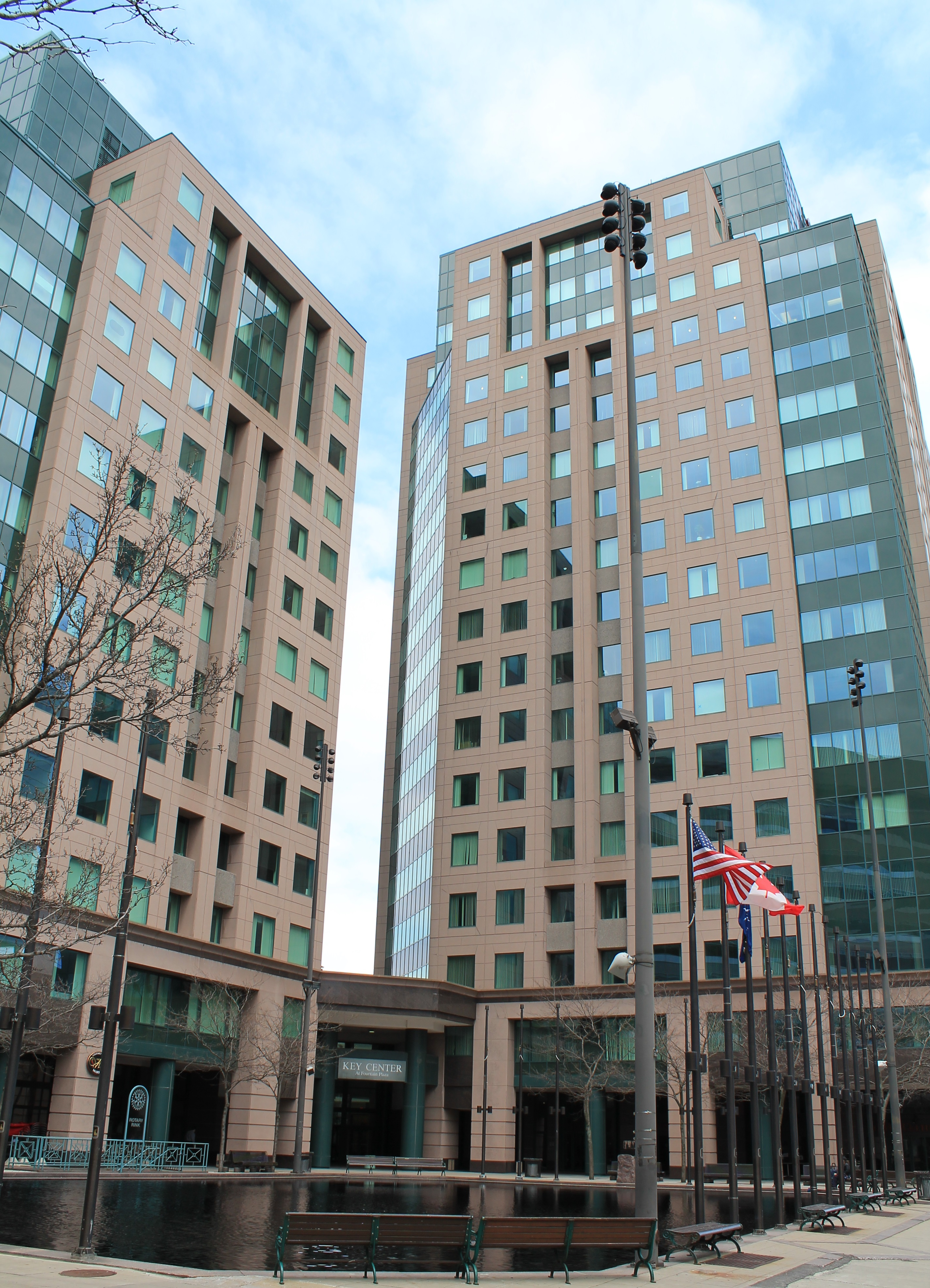
The plaza in spring

== See also ==
- List of tallest buildings in Buffalo, New York
