= Genesee Building/Hyatt Regency Hotel =

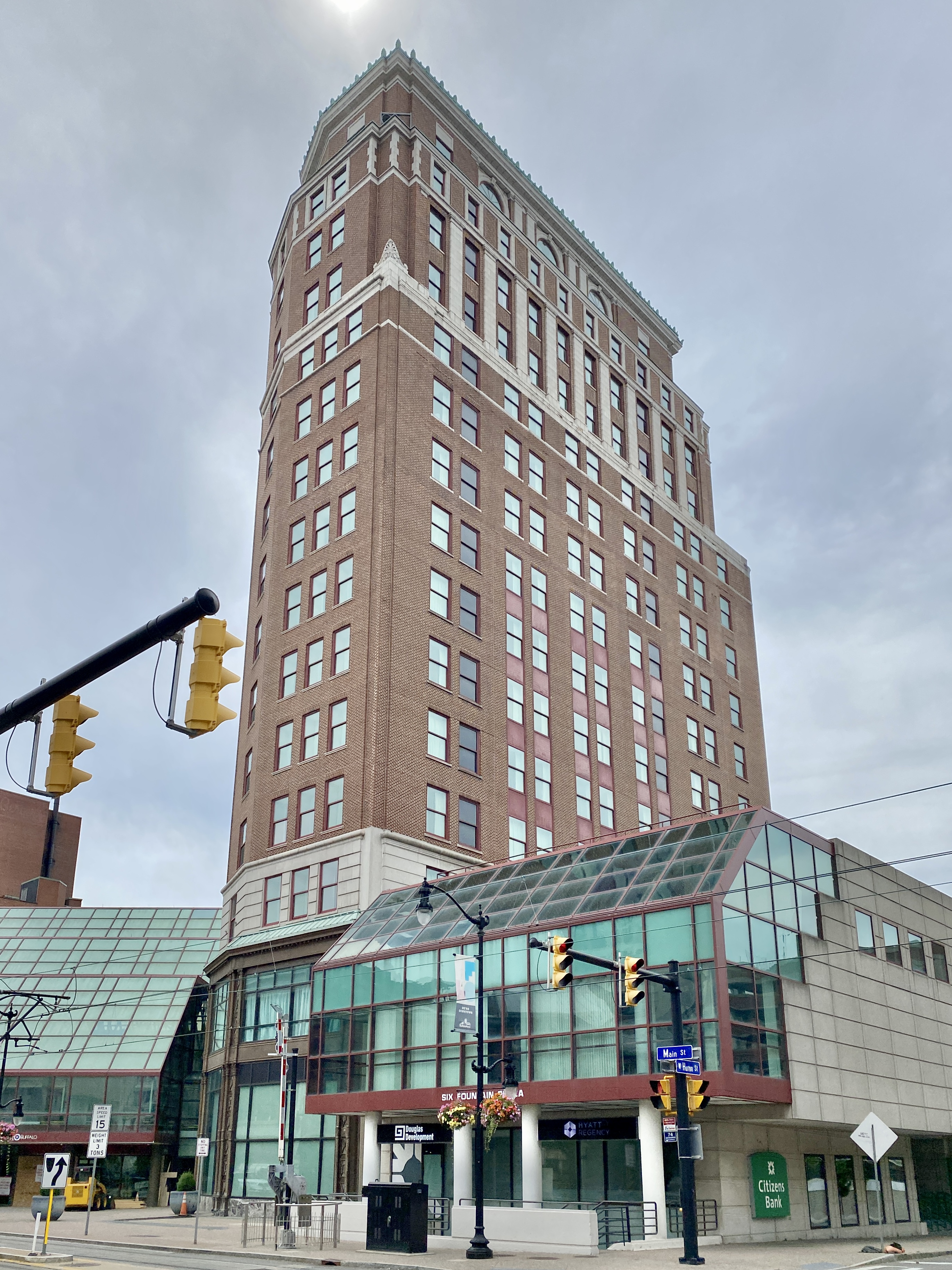
- Hyatt Regency Hotel in 2022
- Former names: Genesee House, The Genesee Hotel

General information
- Address: 2 Fountain Plaza
- Coordinates: 42°53′18.82″N 78°52′26.63″W
- Owner: Jemal’s Genesee LLC

Genesee Building/Hyatt Regency Hotel is a 15-story tall hotel building in Buffalo, New York that was built as the Hyatt Regency Hotel in 1922 by architects E.B. Green and William S. Wicks.

== History ==
The building was originally built as the Genesee Building in 1811 as a quick way-station for people like farmers carrying livestock, it wasn't until 1842 when it would be rebuilt as a 5-story tall brick hotel and then in 1881 it was remodeled into The Genesee Hotel.

In the 1980s the building was under-utilized but a local developer named Paul Snyder decided to incorporate the building into the Hyatt business.

On 1 June 2022, the building closed briefly after its closure in March 2022 after the COVID-19 pandemic which caused the building to lose a lot of revenue. but as of 2024 it is back in operation as Hyatt.
