= Saint Mary of Sorrows Roman Catholic Church =

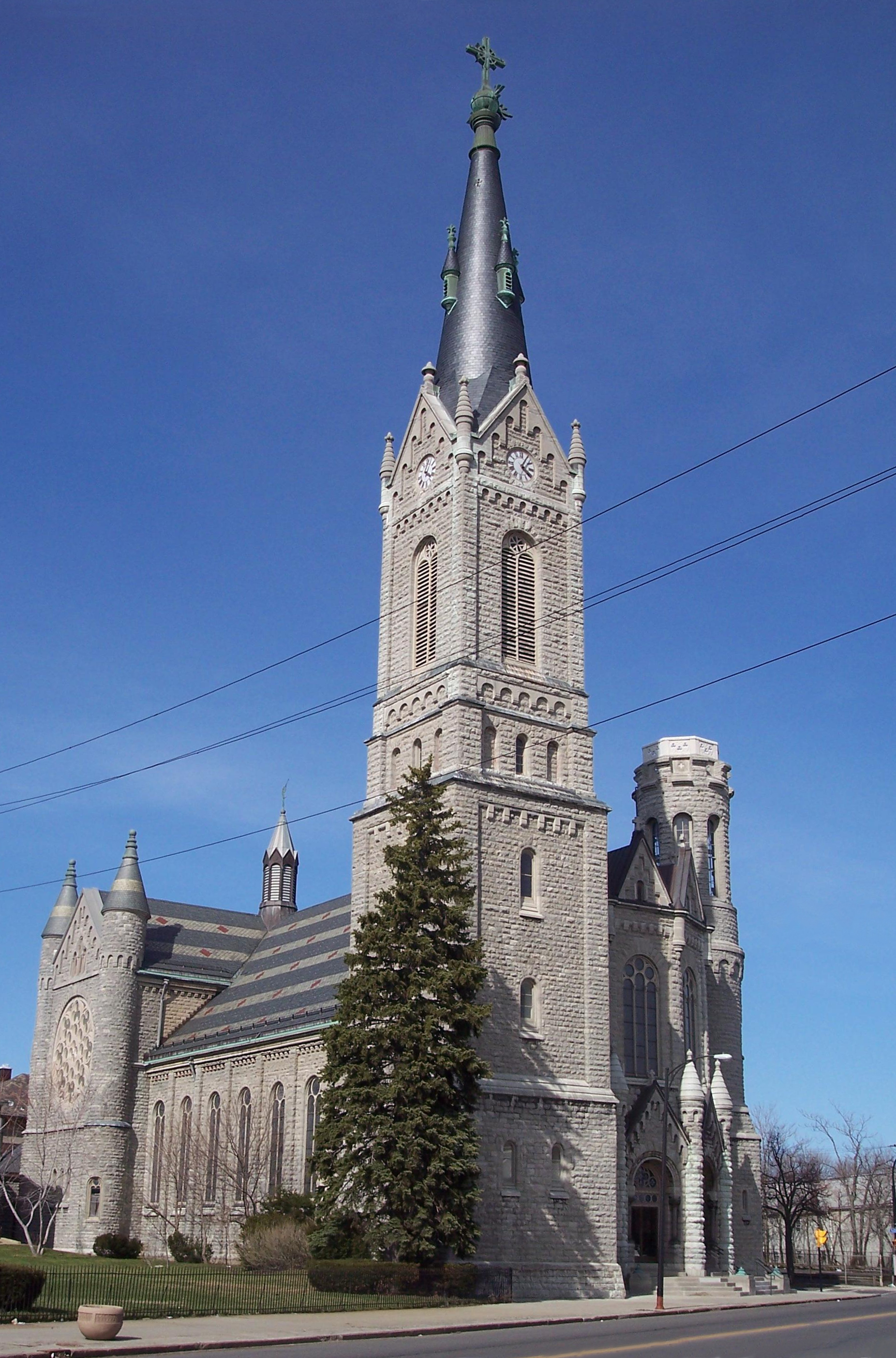
- Saint Mary of Sorrows Roman Catholic Church
- 42.901203°N 78.842904°W
- Location: 938 Genesee Street, Buffalo, New York
- Country: United States
- Denomination: Roman Catholic

History
- Status: Charter School
- Founded: 1872

Architecture
- Functional status: "Repurposed"
- Architect: Adolphus Druiding
- Style: Rhenish Romanesque Revival
- Groundbreaking: 1886
- Completed: 1891

Specifications
- Length: 204 feet (62.2 m)
- Width: 104 feet (31.7 m)
- Height: 235 feet (71.6 m)
- Materials: local quarried blue limestone

Saint Mary of Sorrows Roman Catholic Church, is located at 938 Genesee Street, Buffalo, New York in the city's east side. The building is a City of Buffalo landmark and former Catholic parish church within the Diocese of Buffalo.

== History ==
Construction of the church began in 1886 and was completed in 1891. The church was built for a primarily German congregation in a Rhenish Romanesque revival style with the floor plan laid out as a Latin cross. The church's main tower rises 235 ft (71.63 meters) high. In 1985, the church was shuttered and the Catholic Diocese considered demolishing it.

== Current Use ==
The building underwent renovations from 1986 to 1996 which included a new roof, repairs to bell tower, façade cleaning, and life safety systems. The building is now known as the King Urban Life Center and contains the King Center Charter School. Four classrooms were built in the sanctuary space with the chancel and altar being left primarily intact.

== Gallery ==
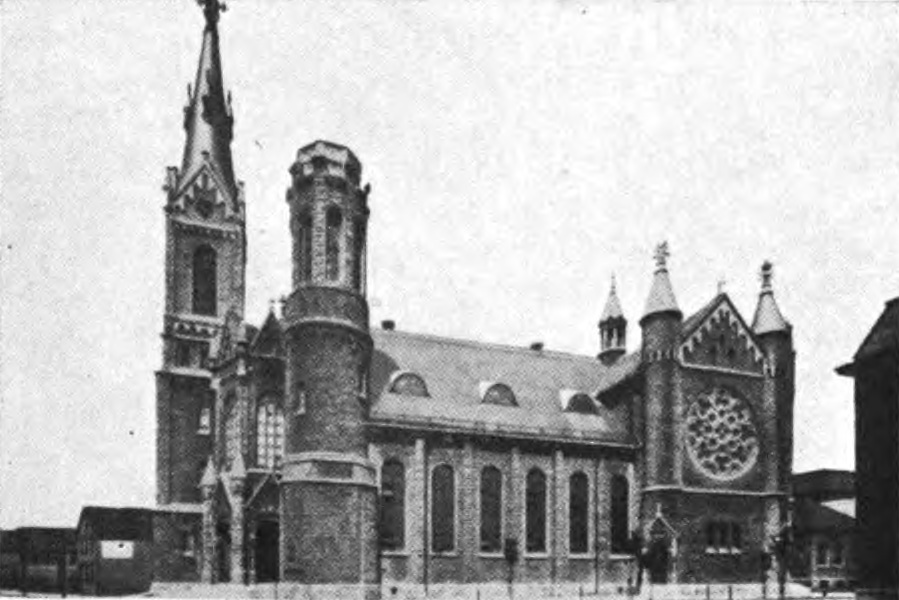
A photograph of Saint Mary of Sorrows from a 1914 publication

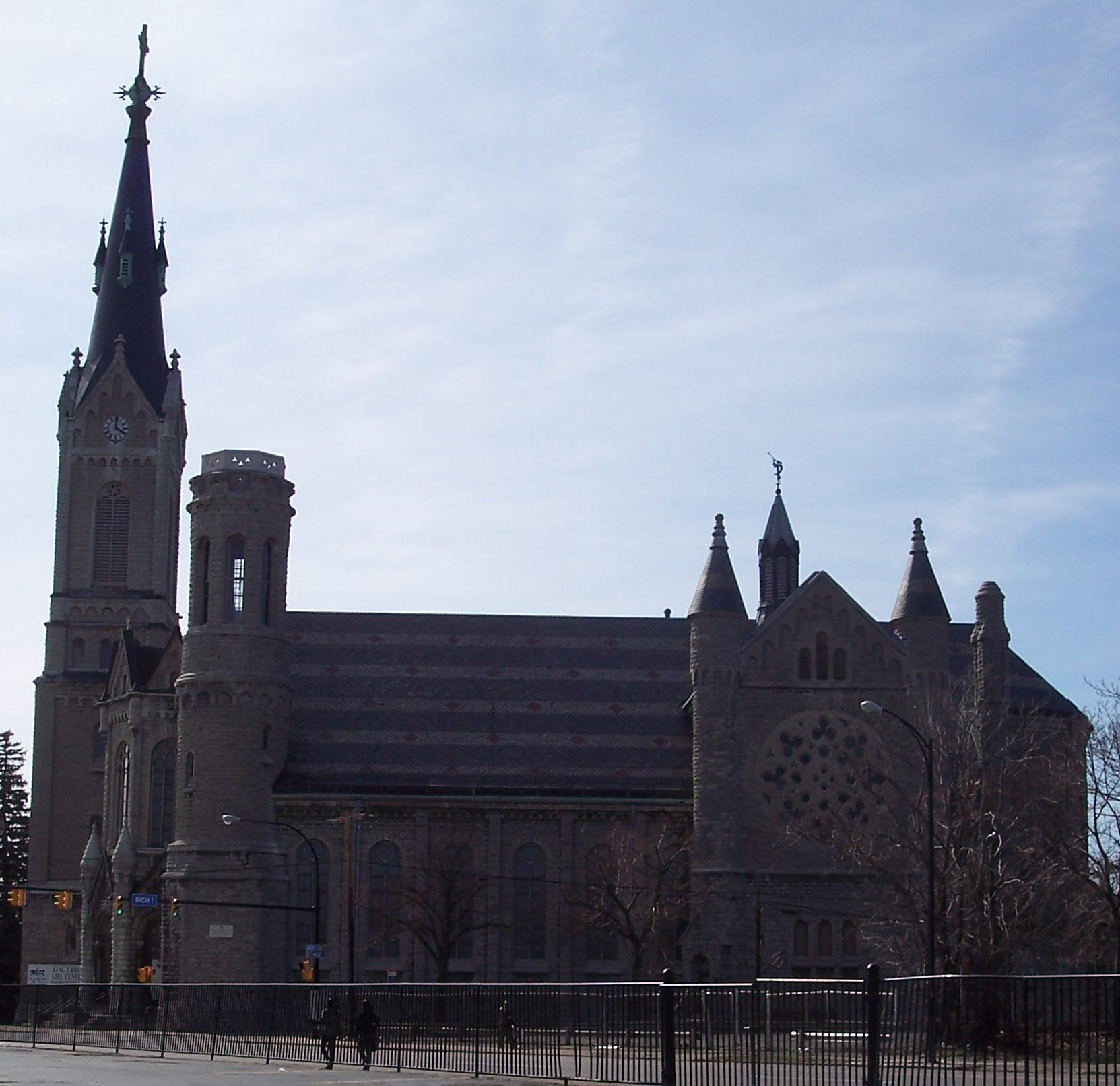
Side view
