= Tishman Building =

Tishman Building may refer to:

- 10 Lafayette Square, Buffalo, New York, United States
- 666 Fifth Avenue, Manhattan, New York, United States
