= Rand Building =

Skyscraper in Buffalo, New York

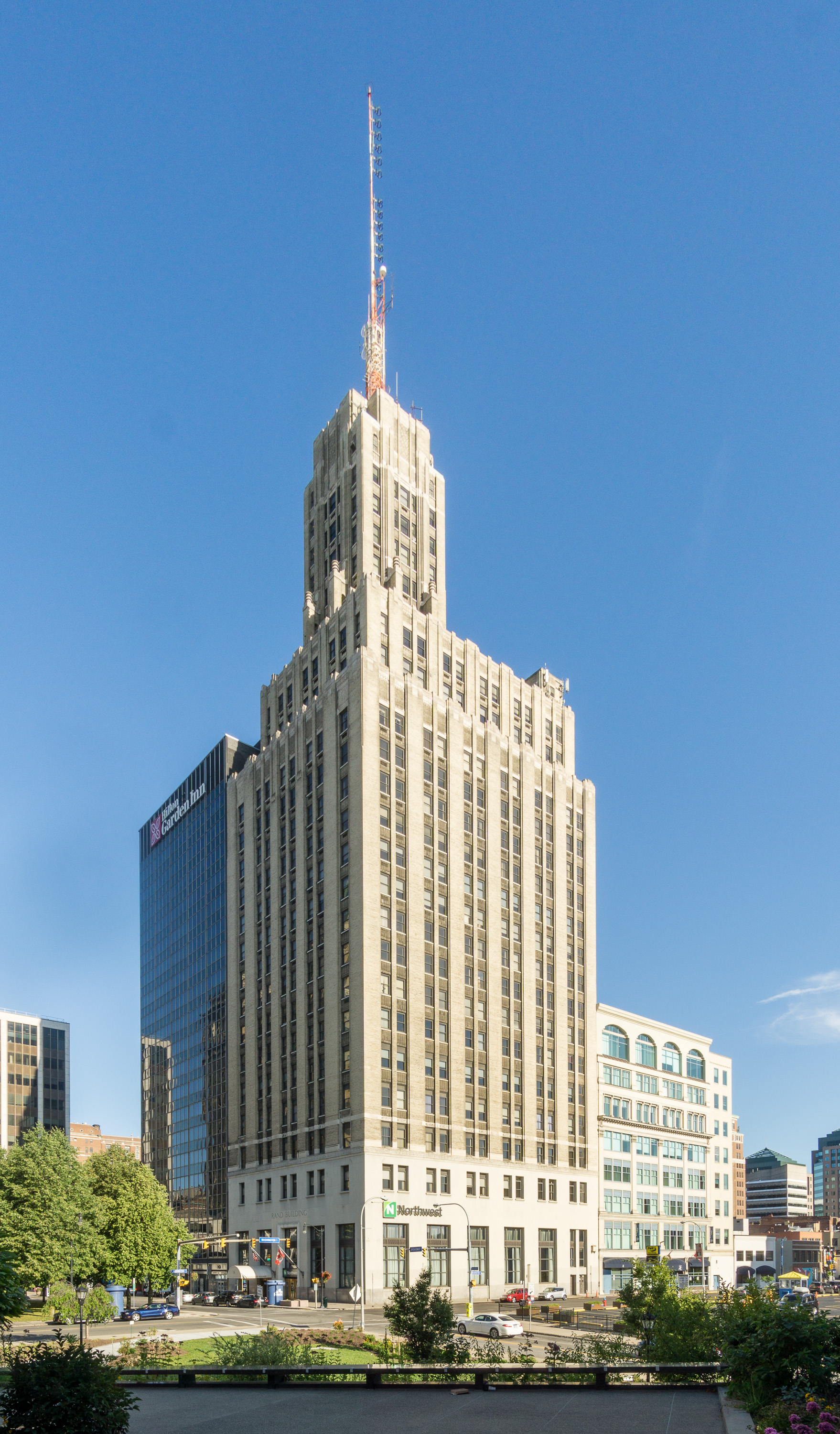
- Interactive map of the Rand Building area

General information
- Type: Office
- Location: 14 Lafayette Square; Buffalo, New York 14203
- Coordinates: 42°53′10.30″N 78°52′24.40″W
- Completed: 1929
- Owner: Main Street Buffalo Properties, LP
- Operator: Priam Enterprises, LLC

Height
- Antenna spire: 405 feet (123.4 m)
- Roof: 351 feet (107.0 m)

Technical details
- Floor count: 29

Design and construction
- Architects: F. J. & W. A. Kidd (1929); James William Kideney & Associates
- Main contractor: John W. Cowper Company

The Rand Building is a skyscraper and the second tallest building in Buffalo, New York. At the time it was built in 1929, it was the tallest in the city at a height of 405 feet (123 m). The building was built on the site of the 1903 Olympic Theatre and it has been suggested that the Rand Building was the inspiration for the Empire State Building.

== History ==
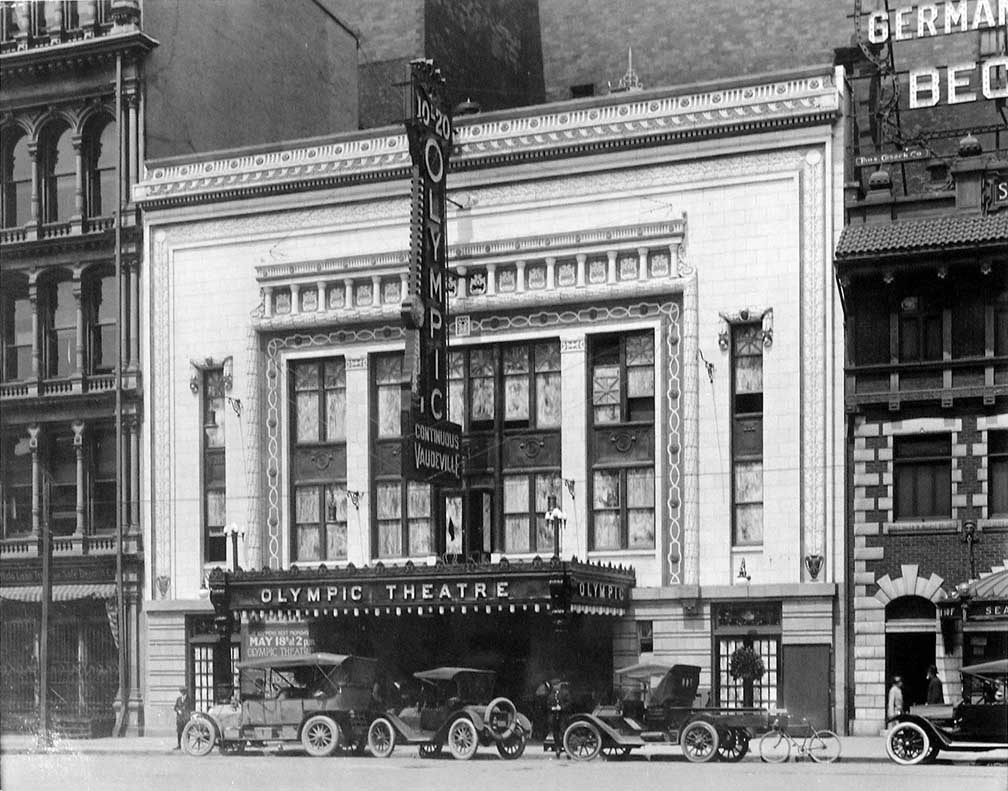
The Olympic Theatre (1903) in Buffalo, New York

The building is named for George F. Rand Sr. (1864–1919), former president and chairman of the board of directors of Marine Midland Bank, who was killed in a plane crash near Caterham in Surrey, England.

The Buffalo Broadcasting Company moved its stations WGR and WKBW to the building; the stations had moved out of the building by 1959. Today, the stations in the Townsquare Media cluster (WTSS, WBLK, WBUF, and WYRK) broadcast from studios in the Rand Building and have their transmitting antennas located atop its beacon.

Adjacent to the Rand Building is 10 Lafayette Square in Lafayette Square.

George F. Rand Jr. had a private dining room on the top floor of the building that he used for business lunches. When the building opened, it featured an elaborate lighting system that highlighted its art deco stepped back style.

A Zeppelin mooring post still in use on the Rand Building's roof.

In December 2014, the building was sold by real estate developer David L. Sweet to Paul J. Kolkmeyer, a developer and former CEO of First Niagara Bank, for $3.89 million. Kolkmeyer's firm, Amherst-based Priam Enterprises LLC, buys, manages and develops residential apartment buildings and student housing in Buffalo and the surrounding communities. In addition to purchasing the Rand Building, Kolkmeyer purchased the Main Court Building at 438 Main St. (for $4.5 million), as well as the Main Seneca Building, designed by Green & Wicks, at 237 Main St., the Roblin Building at 241 Main St., (together for $2.56 million) and The Stanton Building, designed by Richard A. Waite, at 251 Main St. (for $646,569).

== Timeline ==
The site of the present day Rand Building went through various iterations before the Rand Building was constructed in 1929.

- 1830s - Lumber yard
- 1845 - Lafayette Presbyterian Church
- 1850 - Church destroyed in fire and rebuilt
- 1862 - A larger church was built to replace the previous structure
- 1901-1913 - Congregation moved and the church building was sold and remodeled into a burlesque house called Lafayette Theater
- 1908 - Private residence on corner demolished for new building by architects Seames and Zeitler called the Park Hof restaurant
- 1914 - Sold, remodeled, and reopened as the "Olympic Theater," which showed films and vaudeville
- 1929 - Rand Building constructed

== Gallery ==
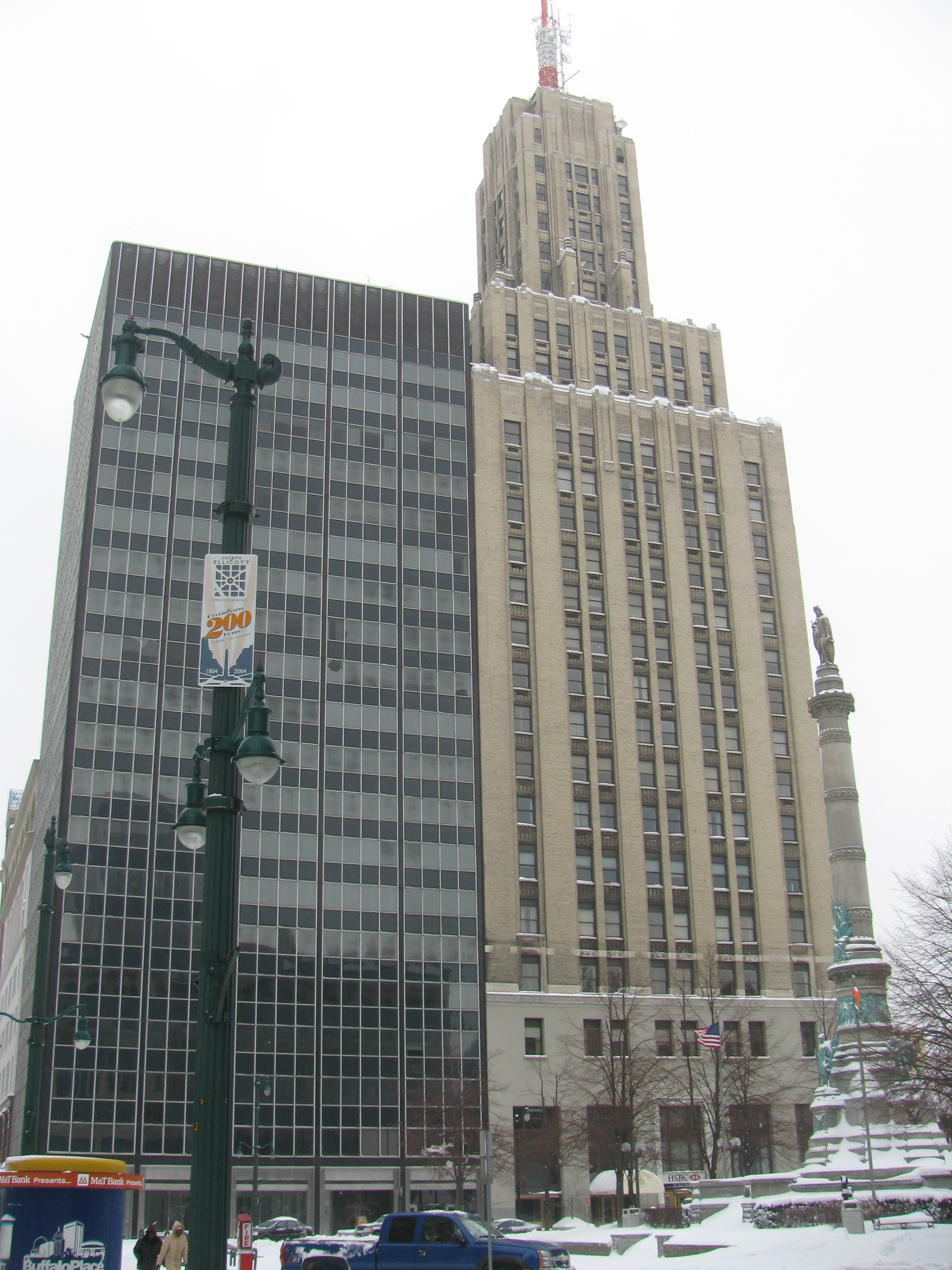

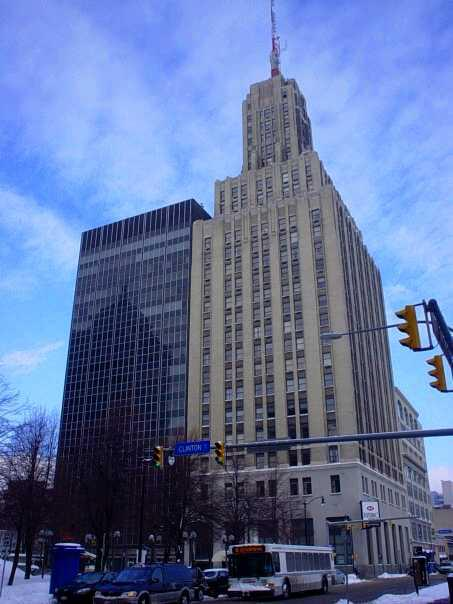

== See also ==
- List of tallest buildings in Buffalo, New York
