= Main Court Building =

Office building in Buffalo, New York

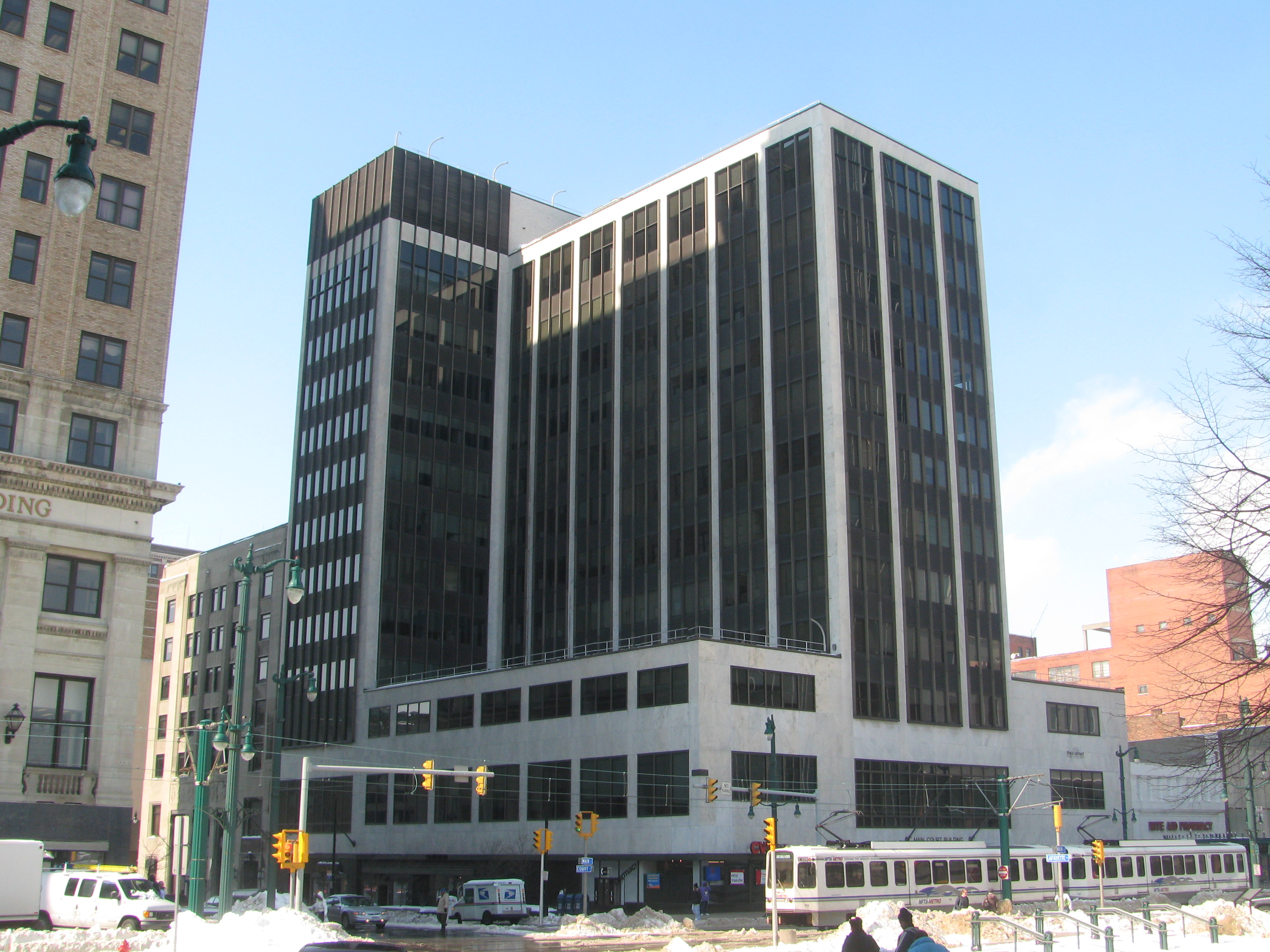

General information
- Status: Completed
- Type: Office
- Location: 432-446 Main St. Buffalo, New York 14202, United States
- Coordinates: 42.88611°N 78.874234°W
- Completed: 1963
- Owner: Main Street Buffalo Properties, LP
- Management: Priam Enterprises, LLC

Height
- Roof: 188 feet (57 m)

Technical details
- Floor count: 13
- Floor area: 162,133 sq ft (15,062.6 m^{2})

The Main Court Building is an office building in Buffalo, New York located on the corner of Main Street and Court Street across the Buffalo Metro Rail from Lafayette Square. It is 188 feet (57 m) and stands 13 floors high. The tower is located across Court Street from the Liberty Building.

== History ==
The building was built in 1963 to serve as the Western Savings Bank headquarters. Delaware North purchased the property in 1990 and moved its headquarters there, later leaving in 1999 for 40 Fountain Plaza. The building changed hands in July 2001 and again in late 2014. The building is currently owned by Main Street Buffalo Properties, LP, and managed by Priam Enterprises, LLC.

== See also ==
- List of tallest buildings in Buffalo, New York
