= Lafayette Square (Buffalo, New York) =

Public square in Buffalo, New York, USA

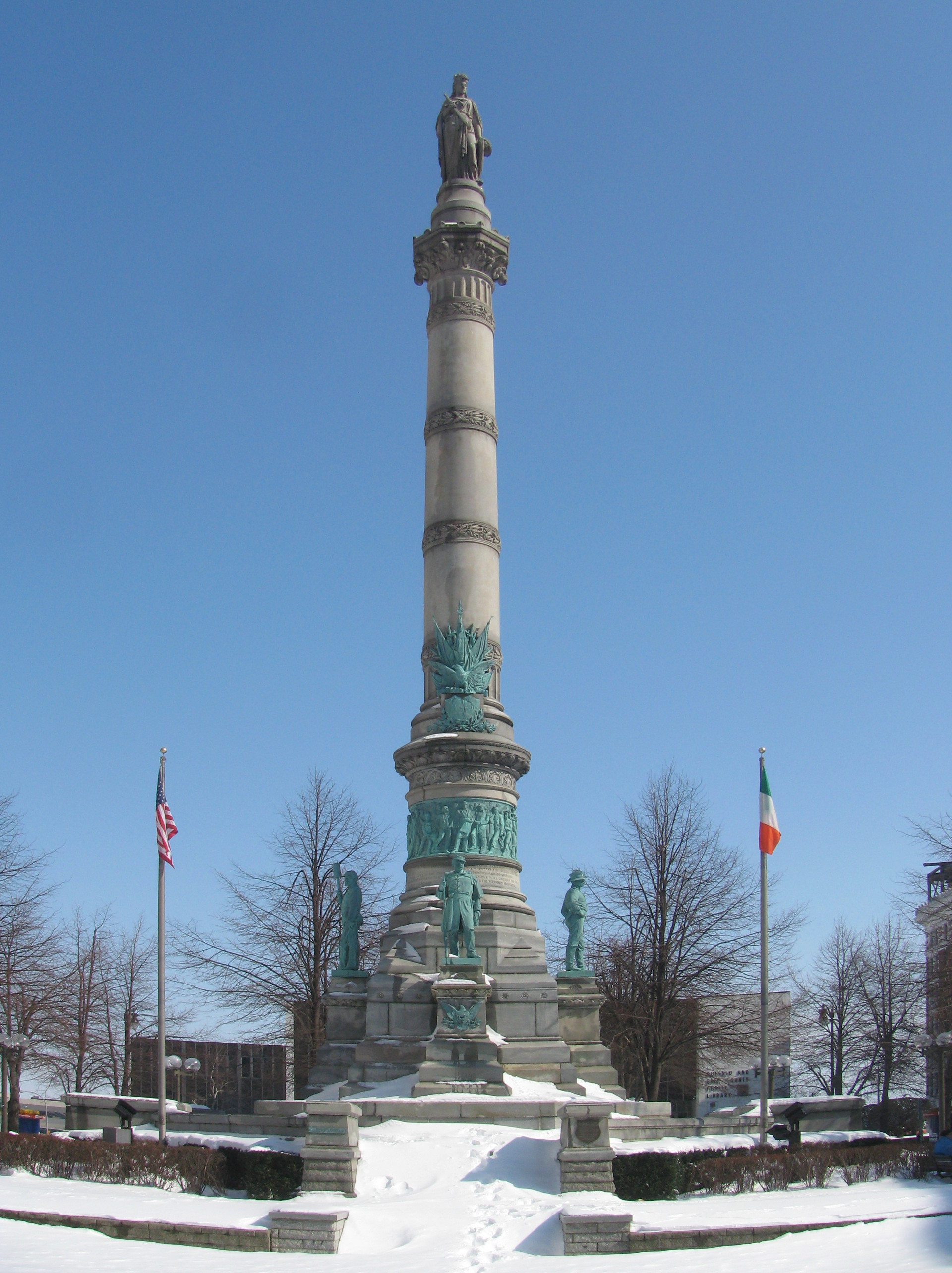
- Soldiers and Sailors, the monument at Lafayette Square
- Interactive map of Lafayette Square
- Type: Public park/Town Square
- Location: Buffalo, New York
- Coordinates: 42.885702°N 78.873808°W
- Area: 1 city block
- Created: early 1800s
- Operator: City of Buffalo
- Status: Open all year
- Public transit: Lafayette Square (Metro Rail)

Lafayette Square (formerly Court House Park or Courthouse Square) is a park in the center of downtown Buffalo, Erie County, New York, United States, that hosts a Civil War monument. The block, which was once square, is lined by many of the city's tallest buildings. The square was named for General Lafayette, who visited Buffalo in 1825.

The square was part of the original urban plan for the city as laid out by Joseph Ellicott in 1804. Its eastern edge has long been defined by important civic structures; first, the Erie County Courthouse, followed by the original Buffalo & Erie County Public Library. Presidential history was made in Lafayette Square when former United States President Martin Van Buren received the Free Soil Party nomination for the 1848 election. President-elect Abraham Lincoln also spoke at the square.

Today, the square offers a clear view of Buffalo City Hall, an Art Deco building three blocks to the west. A granite Civil War monument, titled Soldiers and Sailors, gives a strong vertical and ceremonial definition to the space. Conceived by Mrs. Horatio Seymour, the monument's dedication ceremony was attended by Grover Cleveland and other prominent figures. Until 2011, Lafayette Square hosted the annual Thursday at the Square summer concert series and is occasionally the site of rallies and demonstrations.

== Location ==
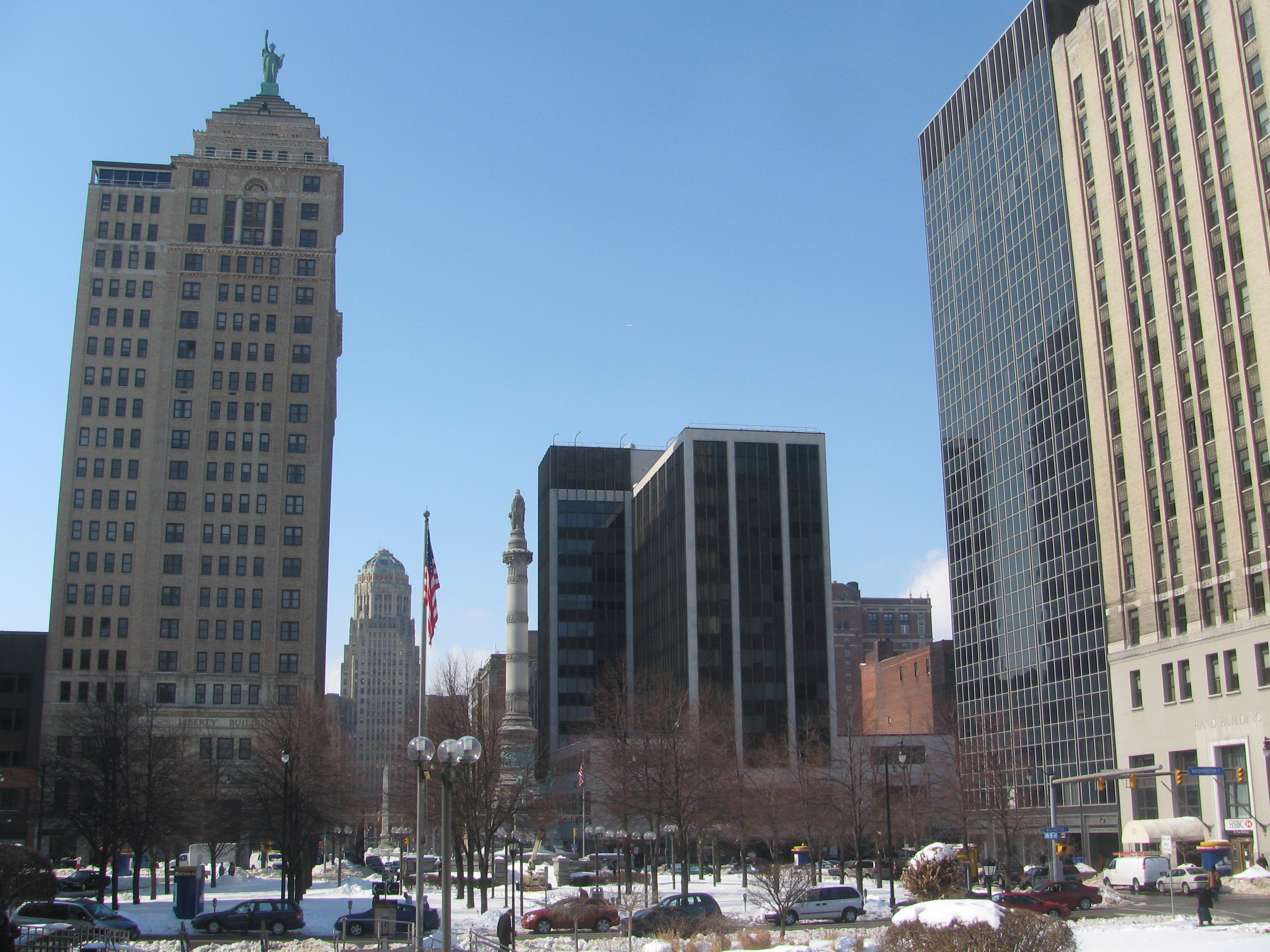
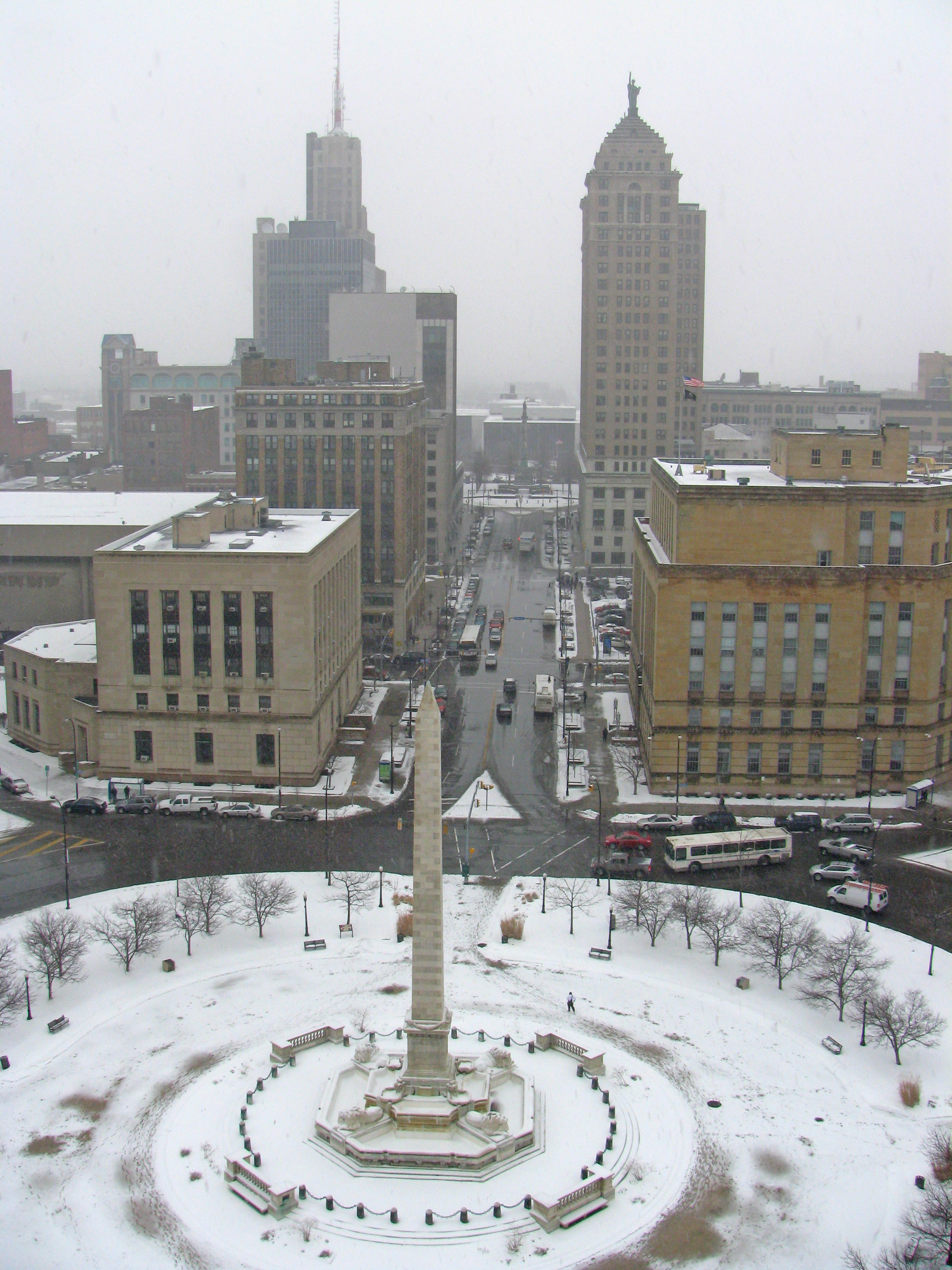
Left: (L to R) Liberty Building, Buffalo City Hall, Main Court Building, 10 Lafayette Square, & Rand Building Center: Niagara Square to Lafayette Square from City Hall in a snow flurry Right: Original city plan with Niagara and Lafayette squares

Lafayette Square is one of three squares laid out in Joseph Ellicott's city plan. The square is located three blocks east of Niagara Square and is the second most important space in downtown Buffalo. The block is surrounded by the Niagara Frontier Transportation Authority's Metro Rail light rail rapid transit to the west, which runs above-ground along Main Street in what is called the Free Fare Zone, Washington Street to the east, Lafayette Square to the north (a one-way westbound continuation of Broadway) and Lafayette Square to the south (a one-way eastbound connection to Clinton Street).

Buildings flanking the square include the Liberty Building, the Main Court Building, 10 Lafayette Square, the Rand Building (14 Lafayette Square), and the Buffalo & Erie County Public Library (One Lafayette Square). The south side of the square hosts two historic buildings: the 300-room Lafayette Hotel, designed by Louise Blanchard Bethune in 1904; and the Brisbane building, designed by Milton Earl Beebe and erected by James Mooney and James Brisbane in 1894–5. The corner north of the current library and northeast of the square once hosted the Buffalo Savings Bank building that was demolished in 1922.

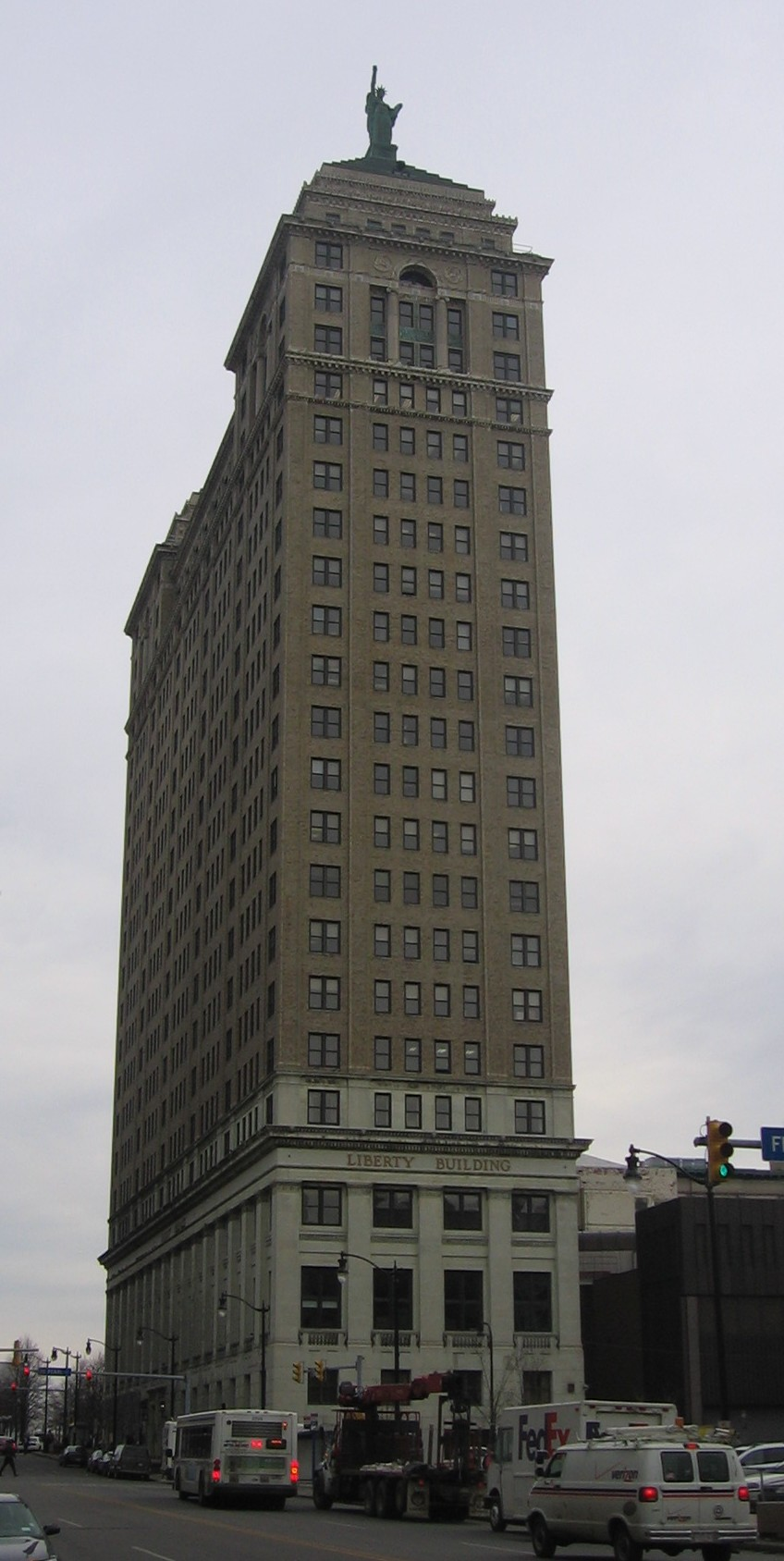
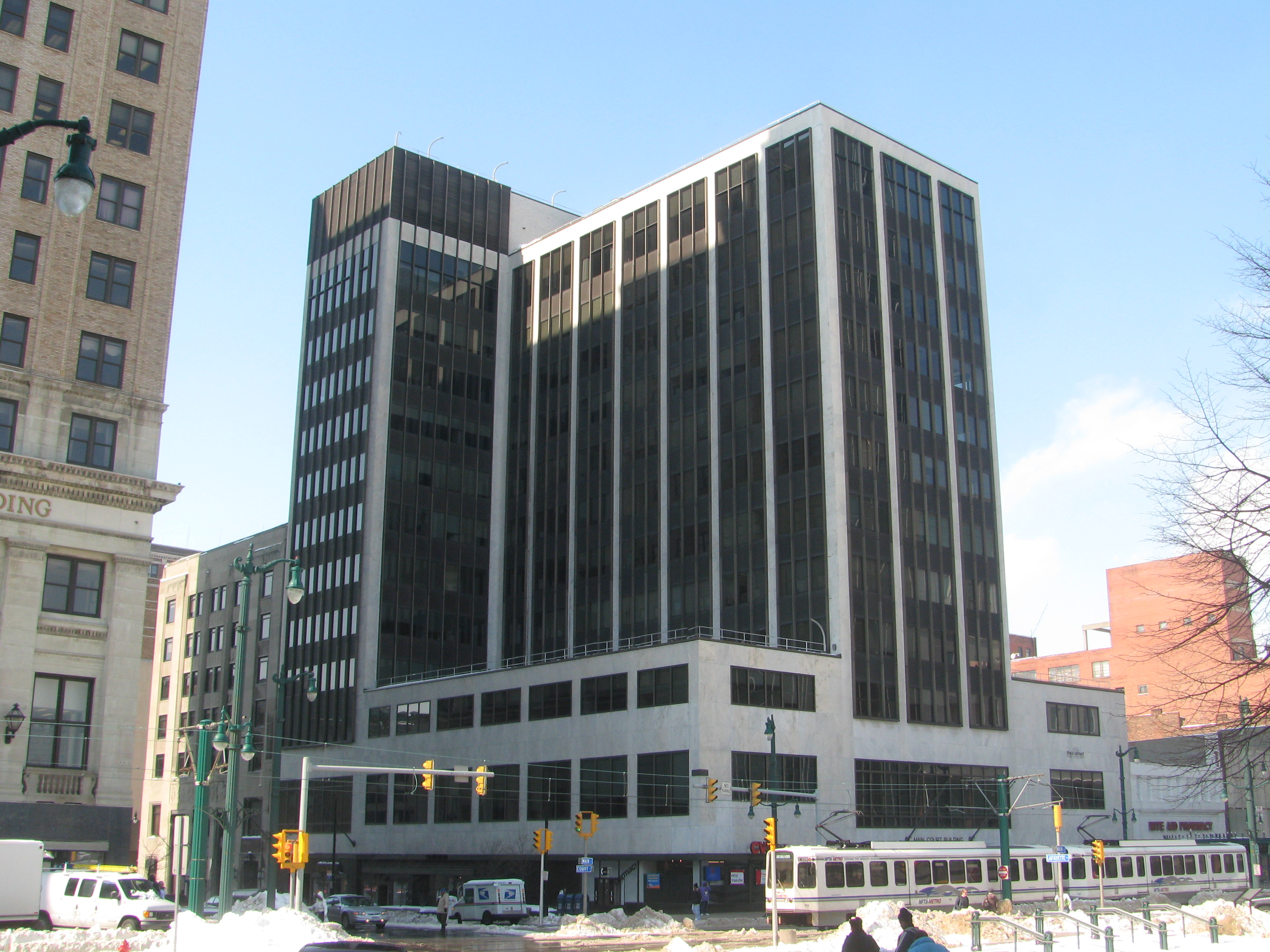
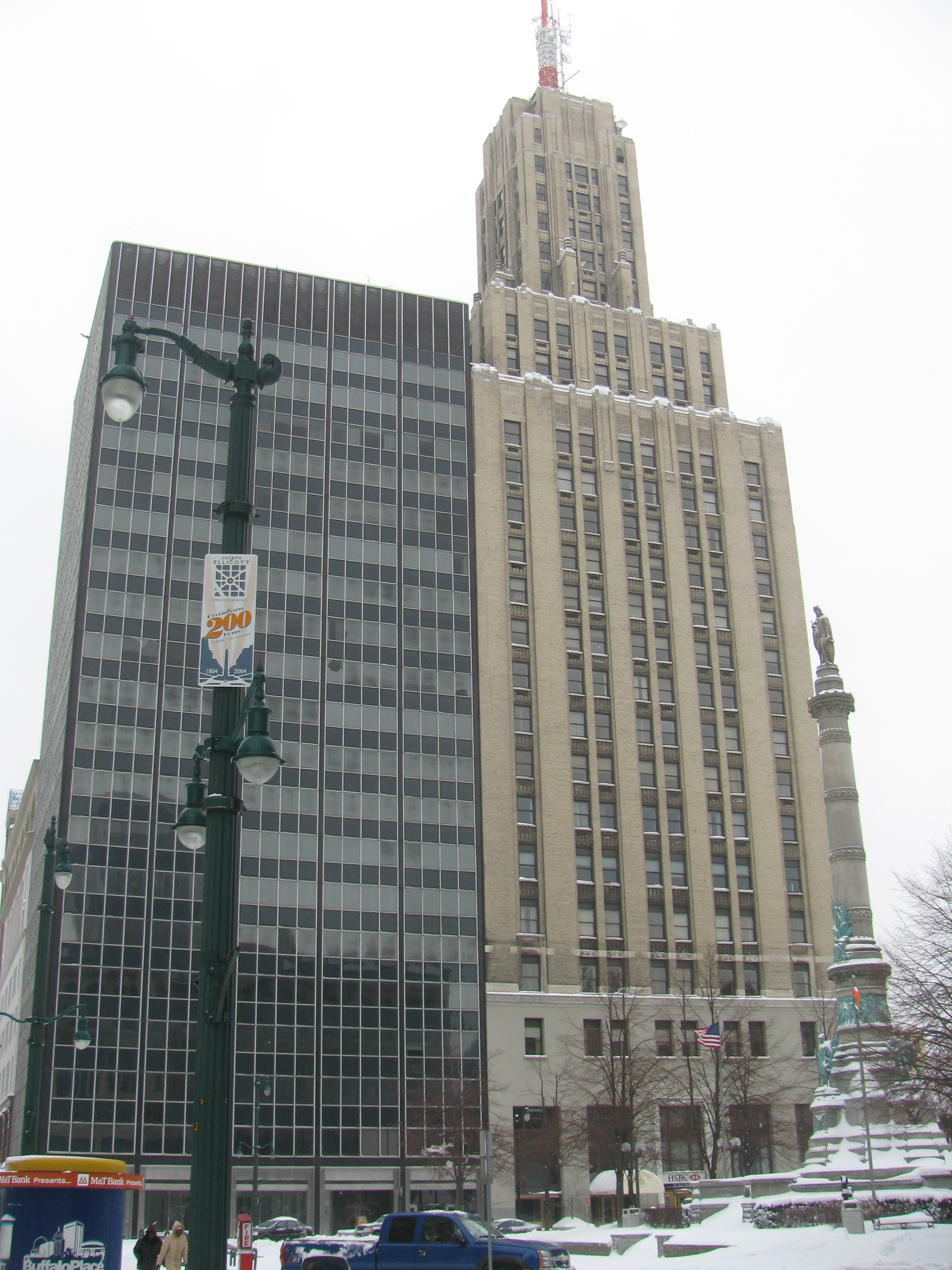
Lafayette Square hosts Left: Liberty Building; Center: Main Court Building; Right: 10 Lafayette Square, Rand Building and Soldiers and Sailors.

Lafayette Square is served by several Metro Bus routes and the Lafayette Square rapid transit rail station of Buffalo's Metro Rail system. In 2003, Lafayette Square became the site of the first free municipal wifi hotspot in the city.

== Design ==
=== Square ===
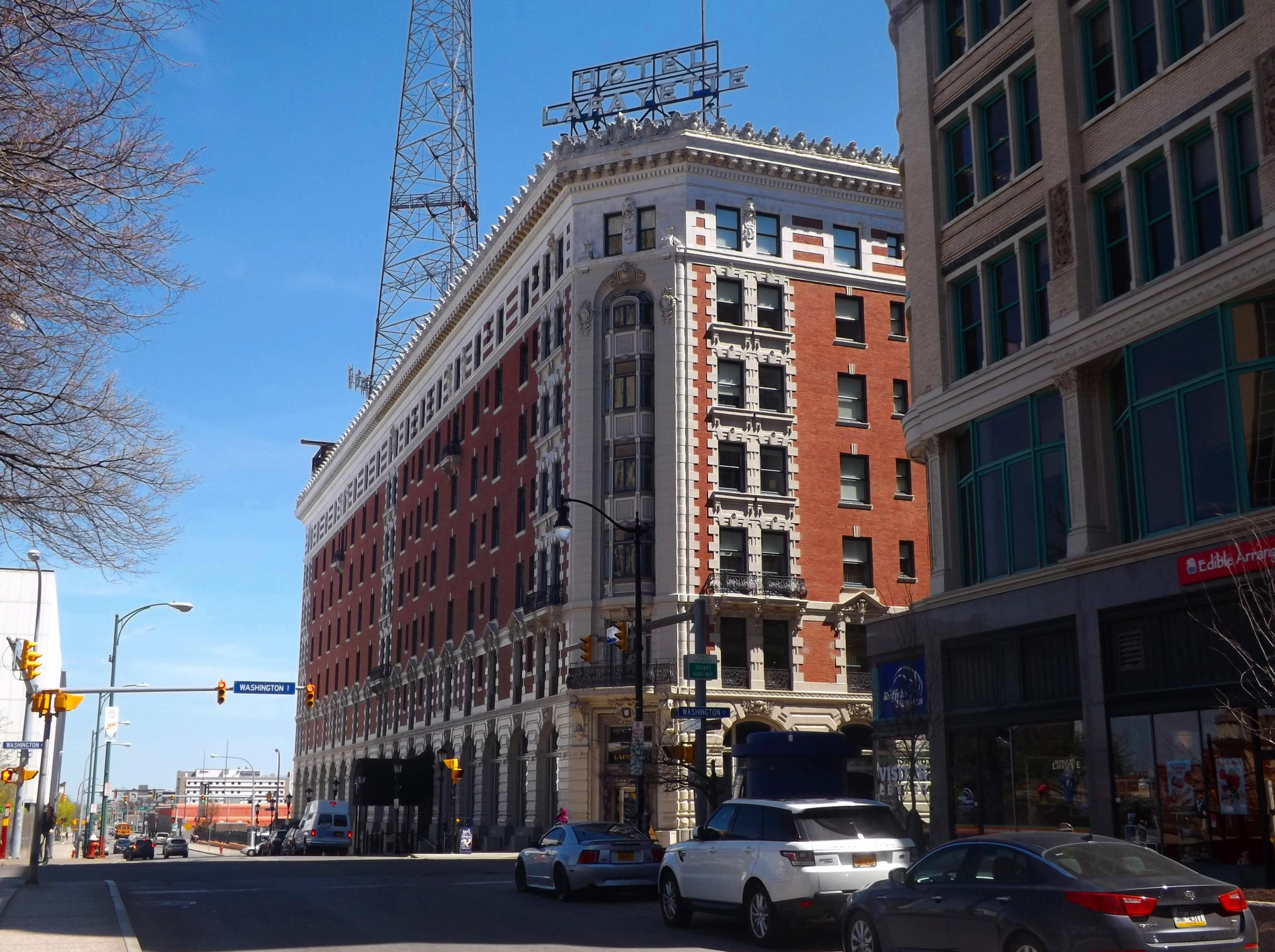
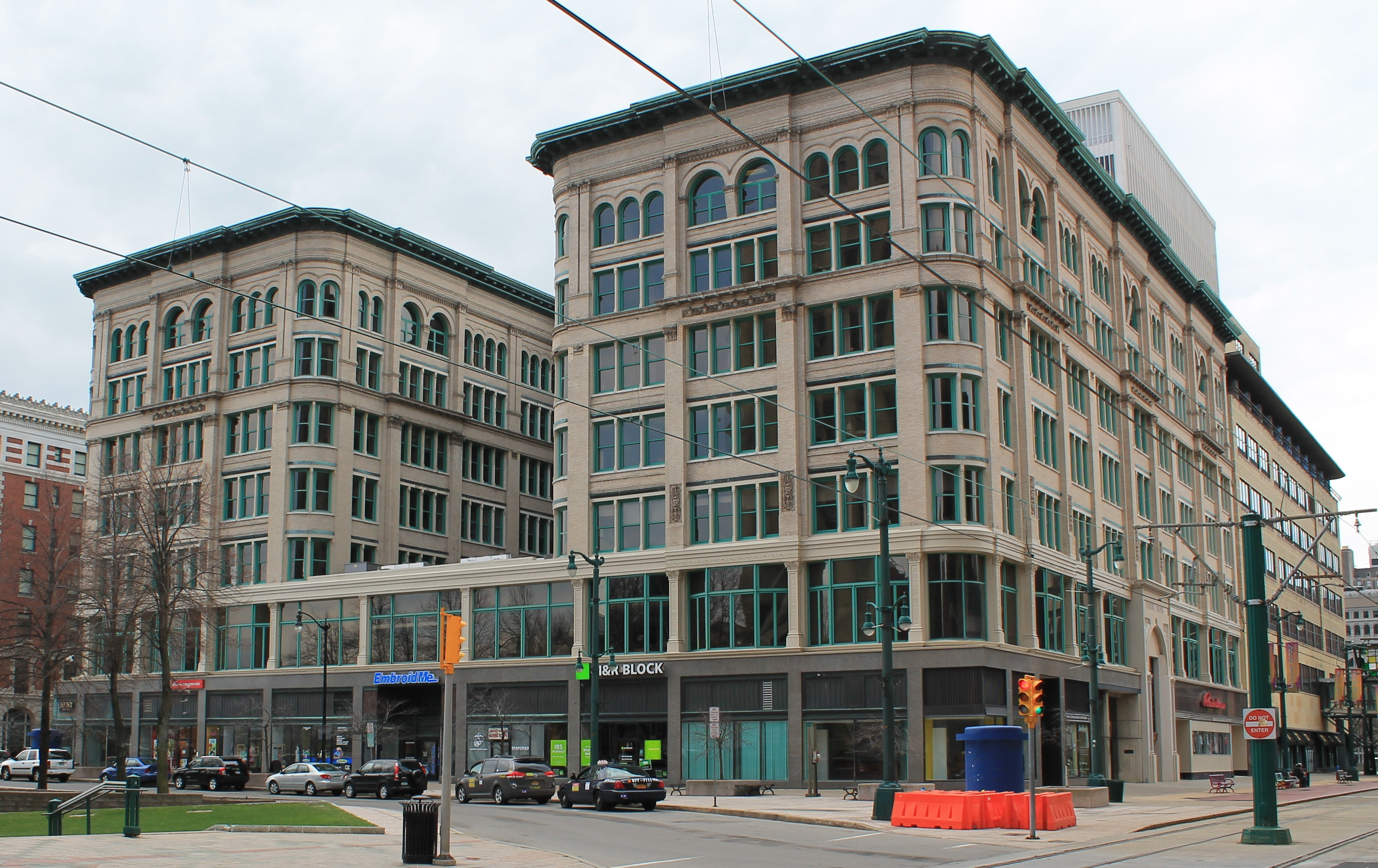
Hotel Lafayette (left), Brisbane Building (right)

The square once was surrounded by an iron fence that was no longer present by 1905. By the 1860s, the square was a heavily wooded park. In 1876–77, trees that lined the square along Main Street were removed.

Lafayette Square was the last park in the heart of the city, but the commercialization of the downtown area caused vehicular space demands. The original parklike square was originally viewed by urban planners as an impediment to crosstown traffic. In 1912, the Buffalo Common Council authorized the extension of Broadway to Main Street through Lafayette Square, which reduced the size of the square "to devote to street purposes all that part of the Square except for a small circle around the Soldiers and Sailors Monument." The square has since been redeveloped a few times and is now more of a thoroughfare than a park. In 1920, the square circumscribed a vehicular circle with the monument in the center surrounded by sidewalks and grass.

=== Monument ===
The monument's shaft supports a 10-foot-6-inch (3.2 m) female figure, and four 8-foot (2.4 m) bronze statues, representing the infantry, artillery, cavalry and navy, sculpted by Caspar Buberl, which face the four cardinal points. Bronze bas-reliefs encircle the column above the statues. The female figure is an allegorical figure representing the Union. By the time of the 1979 report for the Mayor's Committee on the Arts and Cultural Affairs, two plaques were missing from the monument.

The dedication on the west (Main Street) side honors those who laid down their lives "in the war to maintain the union for the cause of their country and of mankind." Half of Abraham Lincoln's Gettysburg Address graces the east side of the monument. Several bas-relief panels feature scenes of Lincoln's original cabinet: Treasury Secretary Salmon Chase, Secretary of State William H. Seward, Attorney General Edward Bates, Postmaster General Montgomery Blair, Secretary of the Interior, Caleb Smith, Secretary of the Navy Gideon Welles, Major General Winfield Scott, and Secretary of War Simon Cameron.

== History ==
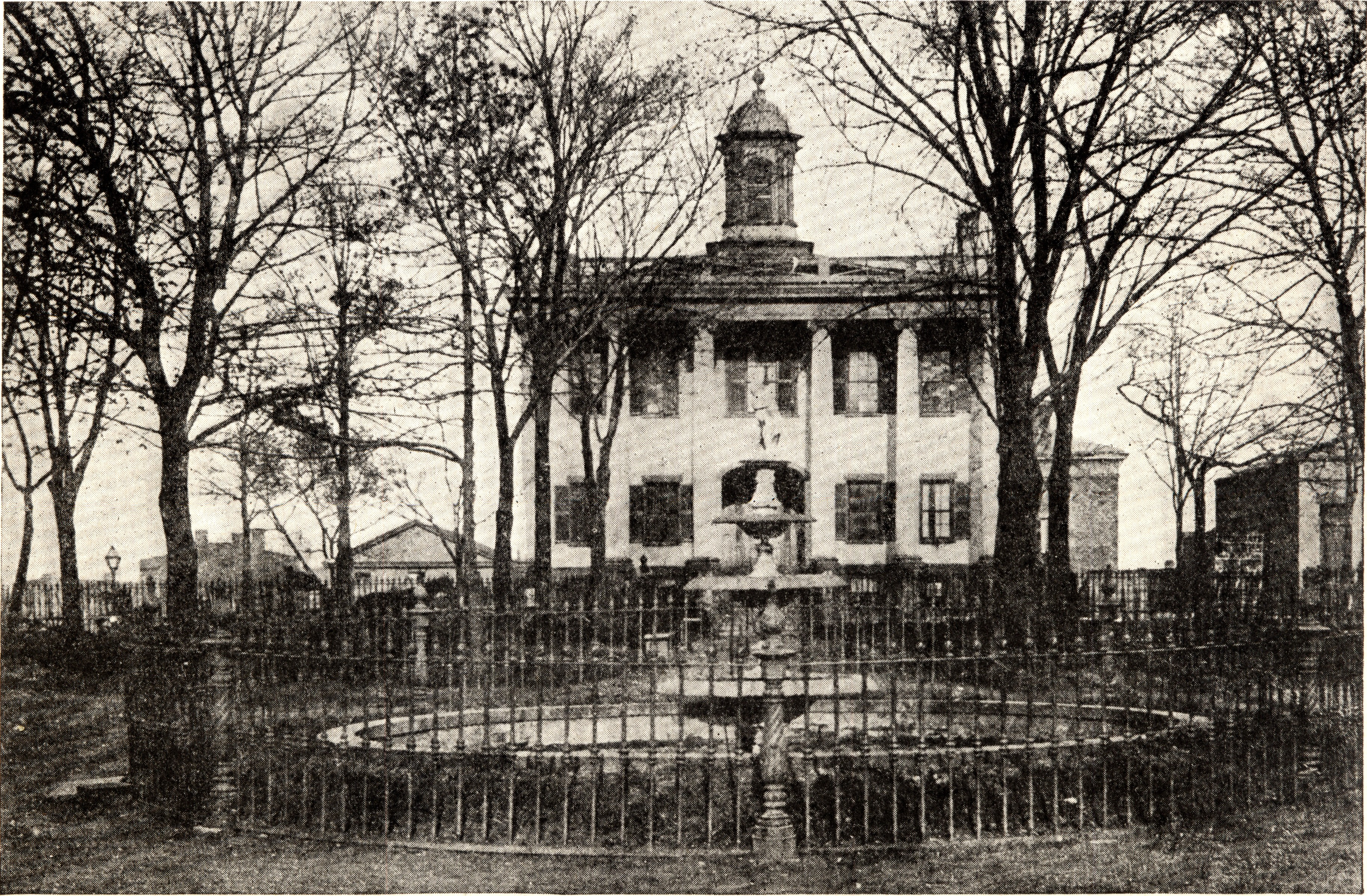
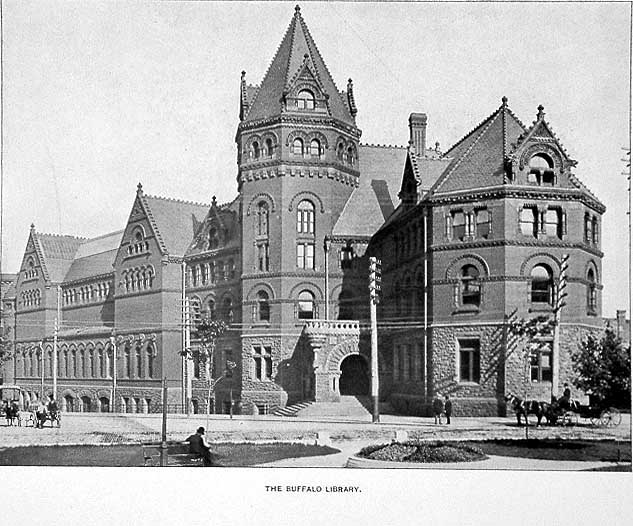
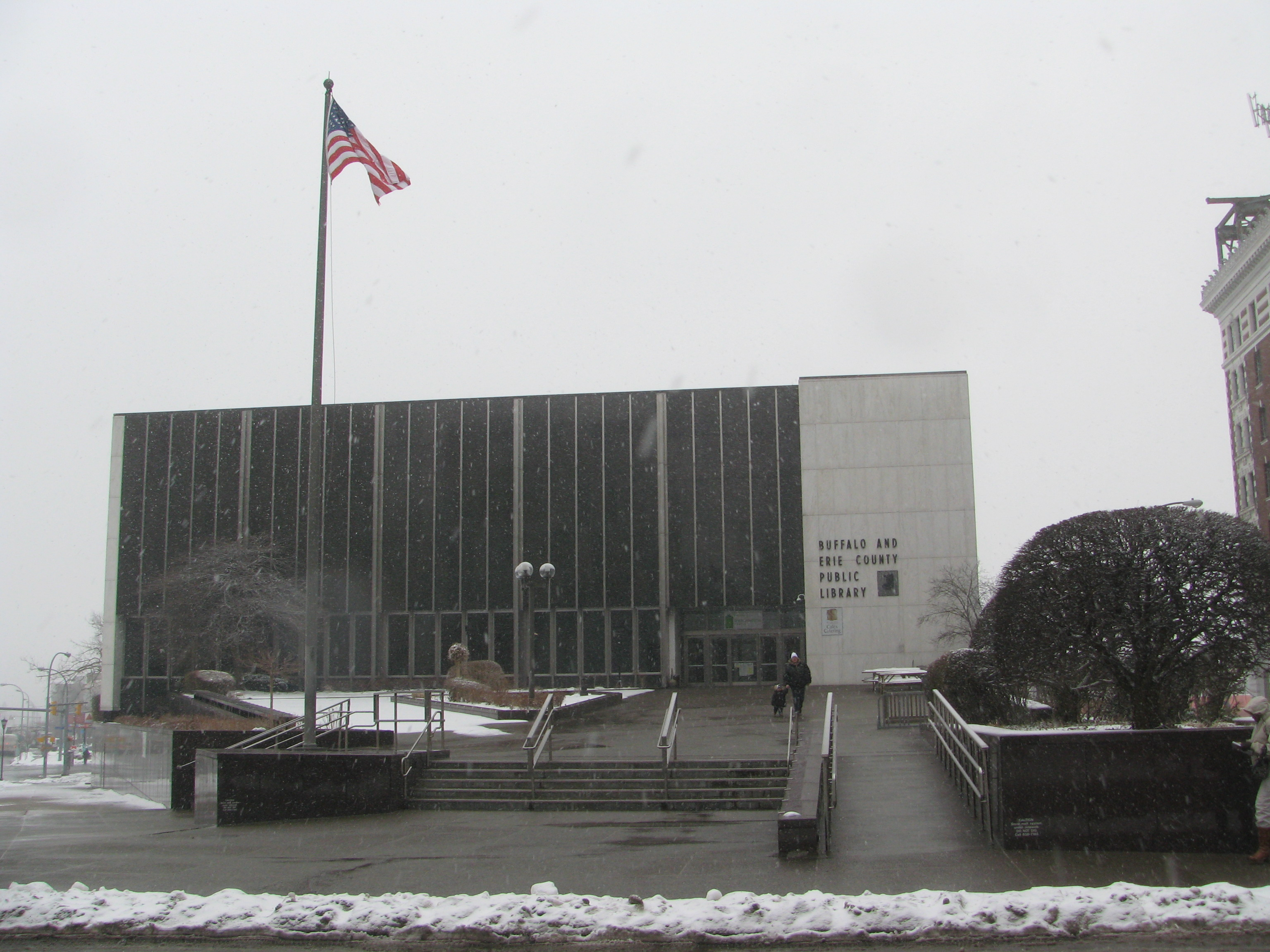
Eastward (L to R): Original Erie County Court House (1818–1876), the original Buffalo Public Library (1887–1960s), the current Buffalo & Erie County Public Library (1960s–present)

At one time, a rivulet flowed from Lafayette Square down Court Street where it eventually met a stream at Niagara and Mohawk Streets. The square hosted the Niagara County Courthouse from 1810 until it was destroyed by the British Army during the Burning of Buffalo during the War of 1812 on December 30, 1813. In 1831, the Holland Land Company gave the deed of the public park to the city.

The original Erie County court house was built facing the square park in 1818. Buffalo was the county seat of Niagara County until 1821, when Erie County was created. In 1833 an adjacent county jailhouse was added. The jail, which was crude, and a debtors' prison were located in the back of the courthouse. In 1853, the city fenced in the square and installed a US$30,000 ($1,161,000 today) fountain. Erie County Sheriff Grover Cleveland once personally hanged a criminal in the square when it was still named Court House Square, after his subordinates refused to do so. President-elect Abraham Lincoln spoke at the square on February 16, 1861. The courthouse was used as the place for the determination of justice for the American side of the Niagara River until it was abandoned on March 11, 1876.

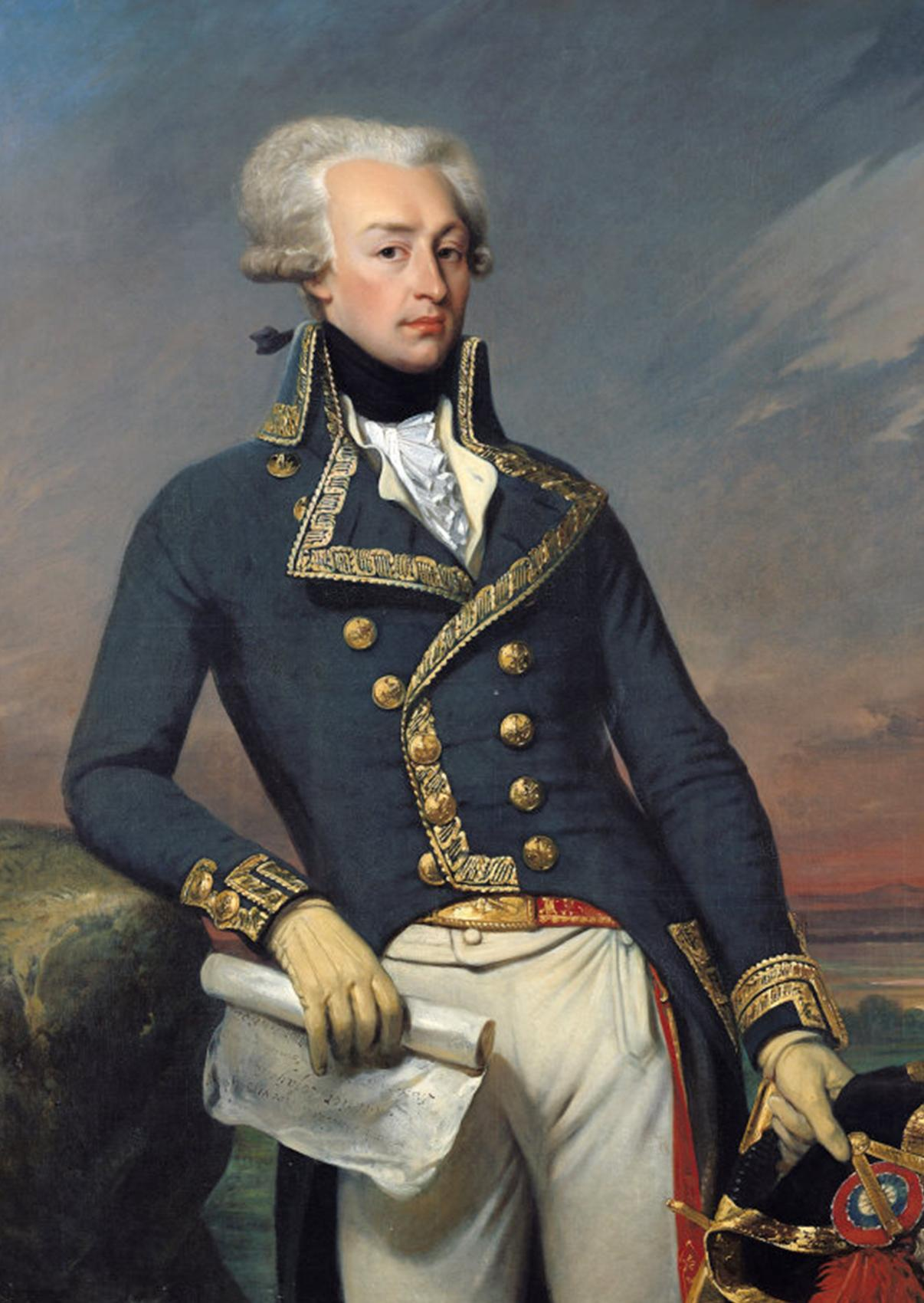
Lieutenant General Lafayette Commander French National Guard, 1792 ≈35yrs

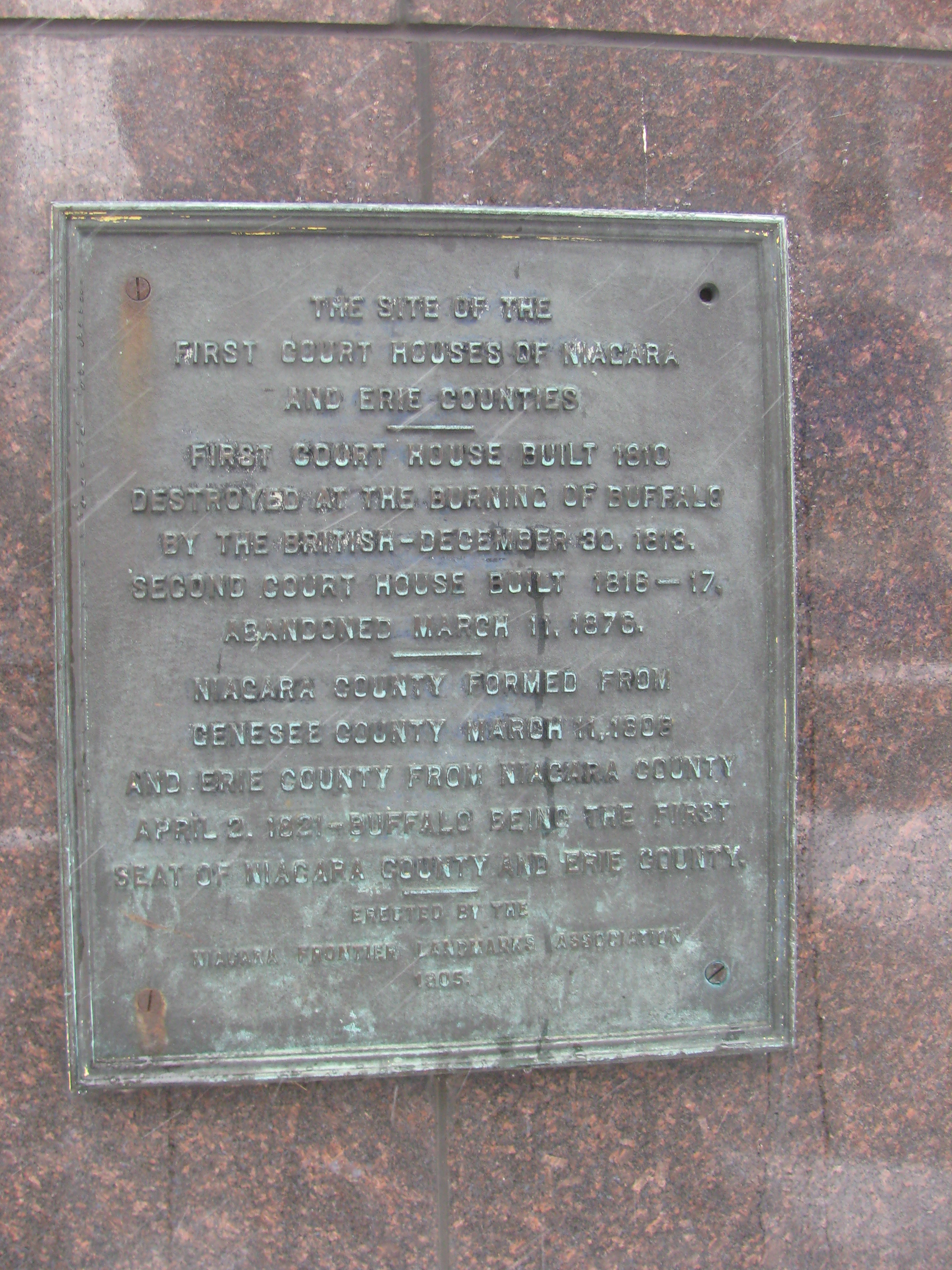
Plaque at corner of Washington and Clinton/Lafayette Square designating the original courthouse site

A Cyrus Eidlitz Buffalo Public Library building was first erected on the Court House's location and dedicated on February 7, 1887. The current Buffalo & Erie County Public Library building that replaced Eidlitz's building was constructed between 1961 and 1963. Eidlitz had won an architectural competition against the likes of Henry Richardson, who was regarded as the nation's top architect at the time. The gargoyles of the Romanesque Eidlitz building were widely respected and admired. However, they were not saved due to prohibitive expense at the time of the early 1960s demolition.

In 1825 American Revolutionary War veteran and French General Lafayette visited this square during his historic tour of the United States and gave a speech in the square. He spoke on a platform in front of the Eagle Tavern, a highly regarded hotel in its day, on June 4 as part of ceremonies to celebrate the fiftieth anniversary of the outbreak of the war. That same year, Buffalo carried out its last official public hanging when brothers Israel, Isaac and Nelson Thayer were hanged for murdering John Love, which some accounts say occurred in the square, while others say it was at Niagara Square. The square hosted many public meetings and early Erie County Fairs, such as the October 1841 fair that was held in the square and behind the courthouse.

In 1848, the Free Soil Party, which was absorbed into the Republican Party in 1854, held its national nominating convention in Buffalo. At the convention, the party selected former New York Governor and former United States President Martin Van Buren and Charles Francis Adams as their nominees for United States President and United States Vice President for the 1848 election. Forty thousand people witnessed the event at the square. The square has hosted several notable speakers such as Henry Clay in 1842 and Daniel Webster in 1833.

The first meeting regarding the erection of a Civil War monument was held on April 14, 1866. Efforts stalled until Mrs. Horatio Seymour organized the Ladies Union Monument Association on July 2, 1874, which raised $12,000 ($341,471) and approved a design by George Keller. Following this proactive effort, the city of Buffalo approved an additional $45,000 ($1,280,515) for the project. Support for the monument effort coalesced when public interest in and support for an arch by Henry Hobson Richardson at Niagara Square in front of Buffalo City Hall faded. In 1879, the name of the square was changed from Court House Park to Lafayette Square.

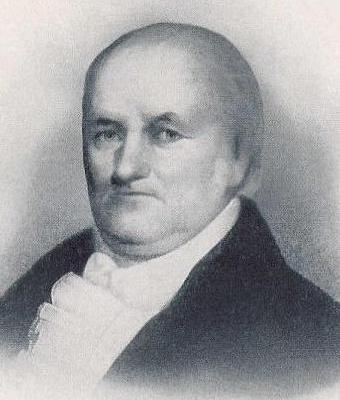
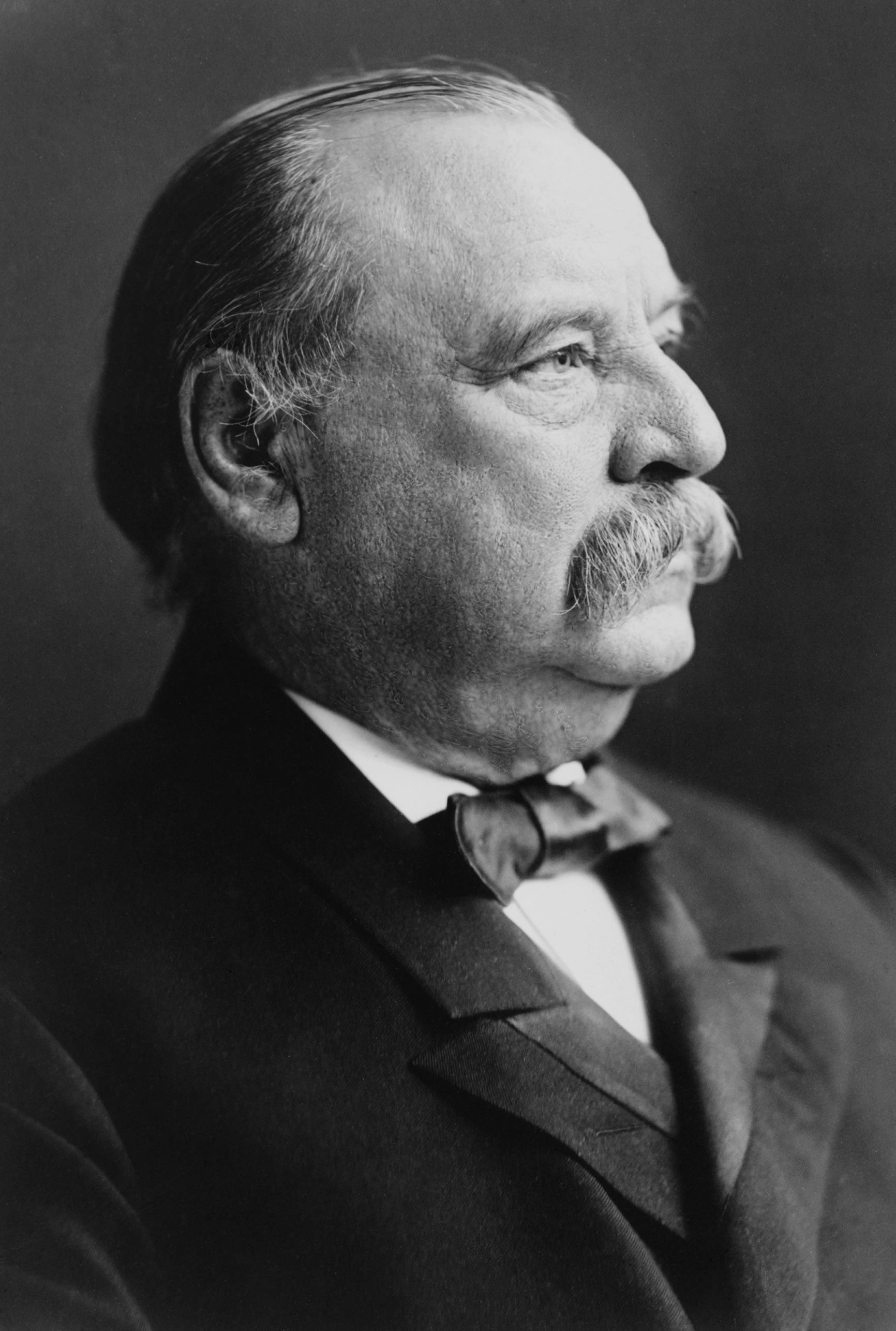
Joseph Ellicott planned Lafayette Square, and New York State Governor Grover Cleveland was one of two United States Governors who attended the square's Soldiers and Sailors dedication.

Then-Mayor of Buffalo Grover Cleveland laid the cornerstone of Keller's 85-foot (25.9 m) granite-shaft Soldiers and Sailors monument in the center of the square on July 4, 1882 and returned as New York Governor to dedicate the monument July 4, 1884. When the cornerstone was laid with military pomp and Masonic ritual, Cleveland spoke, and a time capsule was sealed away. In addition, Brigadier General Stewart Woodford made remarks at the first ceremony. Woodford was among several notable people who attended the dedication, including Pennsylvania Governor John Hartranft and Brigadier General William Findlay Rogers. Columns of Union Army veterans marched down Main Street to celebrate the day.

The monument has survived two significant threats. First, in 1889, the foundation was found to have settled unevenly, causing a dangerous tilt similar to that of the Tower of Pisa. The square was cracking and crumbling due to an inadequate core of rubble and mortar to support the granite shaft and statuary. In addition the copper box time capsule was found to be three feet below its intended chamber and cracked with its contents destroyed. The monument was dismantled and rebuilt with an expanded 15-foot (4.6 m) base. On February 12, 1973, a motorist drove his vehicle into the monument, prompting calls for its demolition by 1982 by the Niagara Frontier Transportation Authority. Instead, the monument was repaired through fundraising efforts by the Buffalo Civil War Round Table involving a successful public awareness campaign.

== Today ==
Every summer from 1986 to 2011, Buffalo Place, Inc. hosted a free concert series, called Thursday at the Square on Thursday evenings in Lafayette Square, starting in May and running until September. A typical schedule includes a wide variety of musical acts. As of 2012 the concert series has been moved to the Buffalo inner harbor and renamed Thursday at Canalside.

Because of its central, symbolic location, Lafayette Square is often chosen for various rallies. After the Buffalo Bills were defeated in Super Bowl XXV, Buffalo Bills fans held a rally at the square to show their continuing support of the team. On January 16, 1981, there were a set of demonstrations and counter-demonstrations on Martin Luther King Jr. Day at Lafayette Square, Niagara Square and nearby areas by the Neo-Nazi National Socialist Party of America and opposing groups.

== See also ==
- List of tallest buildings in Buffalo, New York
