= 10 Lafayette Square =

Historic commercial building in Buffalo, New York

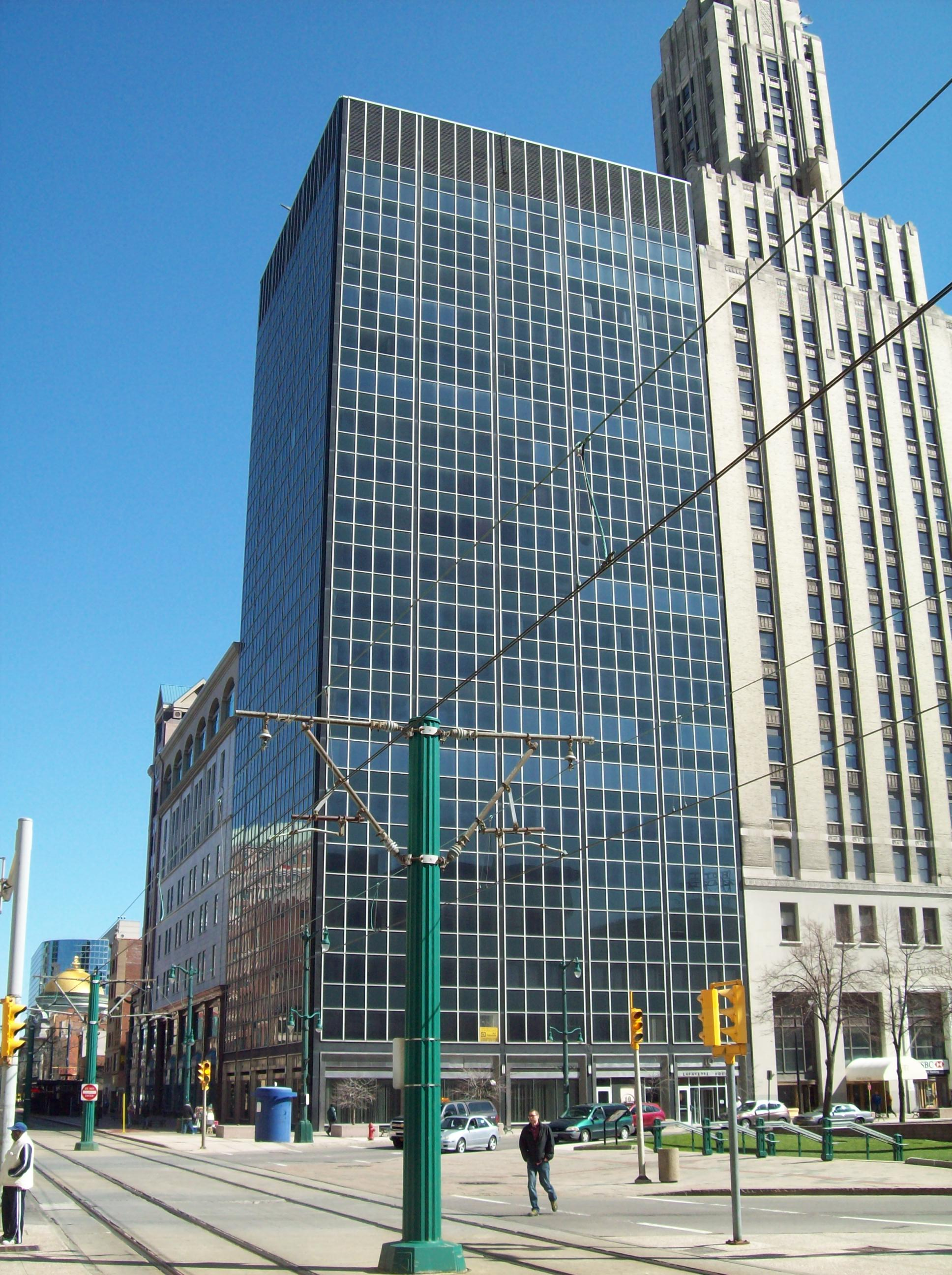
- 10 Lafayette Square (left)

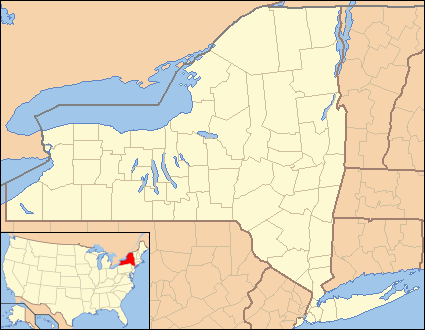
- Location within New York
- Alternative names: Tishman Building
- Hotel chain: Hilton Garden Inn

General information
- Status: Completed
- Type: High-rise
- Architectural style: International
- Classification: Apartments; Hotel; Offices
- Location: 447 Main St. 10 Lafayette Square, Buffalo, New York, United States
- Coordinates: 42°53′10.327″N 78°52′25.129″W
- Construction started: 1958
- Completed: 1959
- Inaugurated: November 18, 1959
- Renovated: December 2012
- Renovation cost: $42 million
- Owner: Hamister Group
- Affiliation: Hilton Worldwide

Height
- Architectural: 263 feet (80 m)
- Tip: 263 feet (80 m)
- Roof: 263 feet (80 m)

Technical details
- Structural system: Rigid frame
- Material: Concrete and glass
- Floor count: 20
- Lifts/elevators: 5
- Grounds: 140,000 square feet (13,000 m^{2})

Design and construction
- Architecture firm: Emery Roth & Sons
- Main contractor: Tishman Realty & Construction Company
- Known for: Former headquarters of National Fuel Gas

Renovating team
- Architects: Carmina Wood Morris, PC
- Renovating firm: Hamister Group, Inc.
- Structural engineer: Buffalo Engineering; NEP Engineers; Studio T3
- Main contractor: R&P Oakhill
- Awards: Excellence in Historic Preservation, Preservation League of New York State

Other information
- Number of rooms: 124
- Number of restaurants: 1
- Facilities: 2
- Tishman Building
- U.S. National Register of Historic Places
- New York State Register of Historic Places
- Location: 447 Main St, Buffalo, New York
- Built: 1959
- Architect: Emery Roth & Sons
- Architectural style: International
- NRHP reference No.: 12000012
- NYSRHP No.: 02940.008251

Significant dates
- Added to NRHP: February 14, 2012
- Designated NYSRHP: December 19, 2011

10 Lafayette Square, also known as the Tishman Building, is a high-rise office tower located in Lafayette Square in Buffalo, New York. Completed in 1959, it is the thirteenth-tallest building in Buffalo, standing at 263 feet (80 m) and 20 stories tall. The building is located adjacent to the Rand Building and built in the International Style. The structural frames for the building are not steel, but concrete beams and columns. The building architects were Emery Roth & Sons of New York City.

== Previous building ==
For 81 years (1876–1957), the six-story, cast iron, Buffalo German Insurance Company Building (a Second Empire-style office building built by Richard A. Waite) existed on current land site prior to the Tishman Building.

== History ==
The Tishman building was home to the Fortune 500 company, National Fuel Gas (formerly Iroquois Gas) until 2003 when the company relocated to the Buffalo suburb of Williamsville.

In May 2011, the Amherst-based Hamister Group purchased the Tishman building. They spent $41 million renovating the building into a mixed use complex including the 123-room Hilton Garden Inn Buffalo Downtown, three floors of apartments, and three floors of office space.

It was added to the National Register of Historic Places in 2012, as the Tishman Building.

== Gallery ==
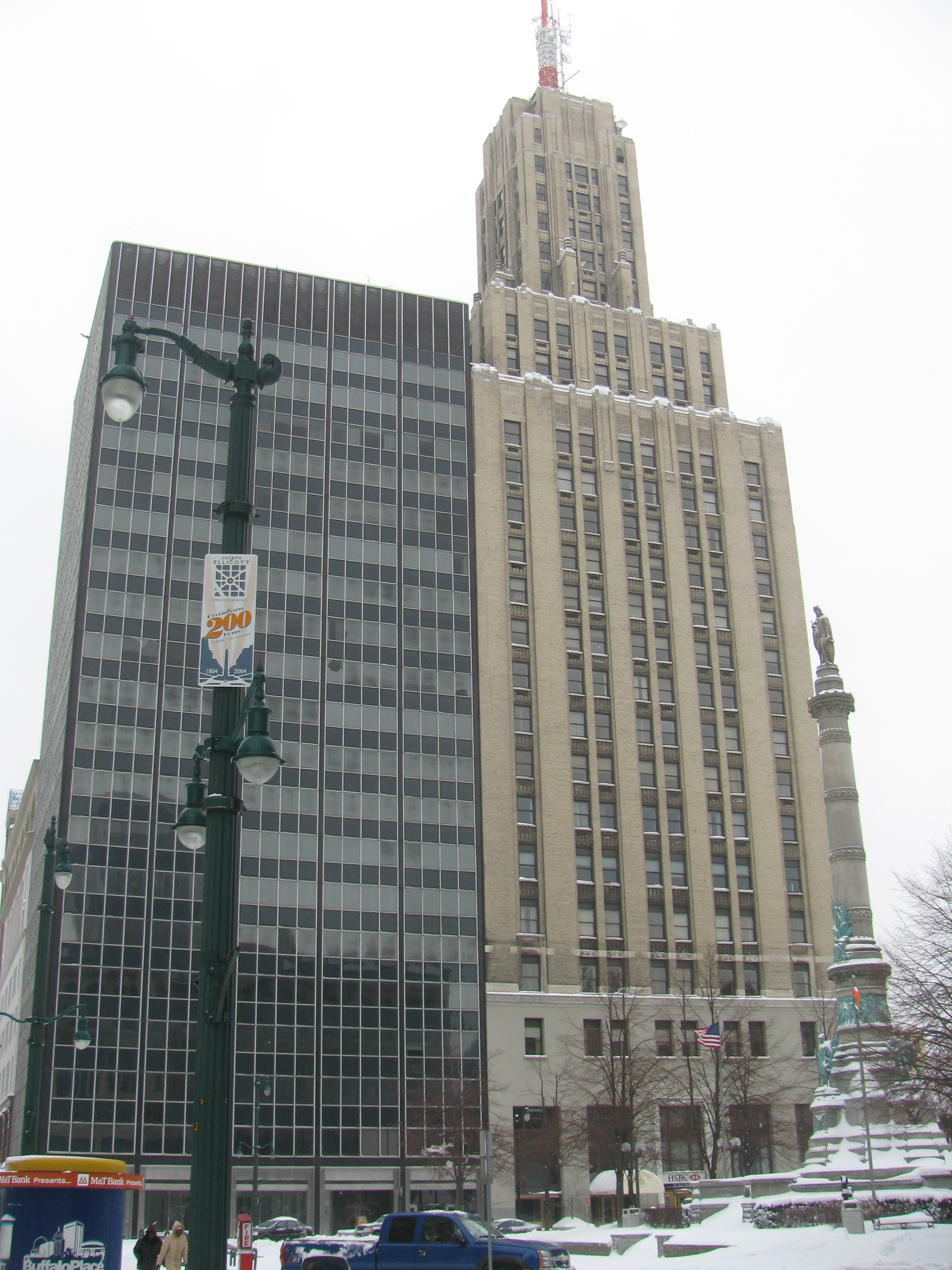

== See also ==
- List of tallest buildings in Buffalo, New York
