= National Fuel Gas =

American energy company

National Fuel Gas Co.
- Type: Public
- Traded as: NYSE: NFG; S&P 400 Component
- Industry: Oil and gas
- Founded: Incorporated in 1902
- Headquarters: Williamsville, New York, United States
- Key people: David Bauer, CEO
- Products: Natural gas, Oil reserves
- Revenue: ▲$ 2.28 billion U.S. dollars (2025)
- Net income: ▲$ 519 million U.S. dollars (2025)
- Number of employees: 2,300 (2025)
- Website: www.nationalfuel.com

National Fuel Gas Company (NYSE: NFG) is a diversified energy company with $8.7 billion in assets distributed among the following five operating segments: Exploration and Production (Seneca Resources Company, LLC), Pipeline and Storage (National Fuel Gas Supply Corporation and Empire Pipeline, Inc.), Gathering (National Fuel Gas Midstream Company, LLC), Utility (National Fuel Gas Distribution Corporation), and Energy Marketing (National Fuel Resources, Inc. - NFR). National Fuel Gas was incorporated in 1902 and is based in Williamsville, New York.

The Utility segment sells natural gas or provides natural gas transportation services to more than 756,000 utility customers through a local distribution system located in western New York and northwestern Pennsylvania. National Fuel Gas Distribution of Ohio serves approximately 335,000 customers across16 counties in the Dayton and the greater Miami Valley region. The Pipeline and Storage segment provides interstate natural gas transportation and storage services for affiliated and non-affiliated companies through an integrated system of 2,800 miles of pipeline and 28 underground natural gas storage fields (including 4 storage fields co-owned with nonaffiliated companies). The Exploration and Production segment, headquartered in Houston, Texas (with an office in Pittsburgh to support its Appalachian operations), explores for, develops and produces oil natural gas in the Appalachia Region. Seneca's primary focus is now the Marcellus and Utica Shales in Pennsylvania, where the company controls 1.2 million net prospective acres that include stacked pay potential and has ~1.2 Bcf/day of net total production. The Energy Marketing segment markets natural gas to industrial, commercial, public authority and residential end users located in New York and Pennsylvania National Fuel released its 2024 Corporate Responsibility Report detailing the Company’s policies, practices and performance metrics in key environmental, social and governance (ESG) areas. That report is available online.

National Fuel completed its $2.62 billion acquisition of CenterPoint Energy’s Ohio natural gas utility business, Vectren Energy Delivery of Ohio, LLC on October 1, 2026, and rebranded the company as National Fuel Gas Distribution of Ohio, LLC. The Ohio operations include approximately 5,900 miles of distribution and transmission pipeline and serves approximately 335,000 residential, commercial, industrial and transportation customers primarily across 16 counties in the Dayton and greater Miami Valley region.

On October 14, 2026 National Fuel announced its intention to separate its Integrated Upstream and Gathering Business (Seneca Resources & National Fuel Midstream)

Post-separation, National Fuel will be a fully regulated natural gas business with nearly $5 billion of rate base. National Fuel’s natural gas utilities serve 1.1 million customers across Ohio, New York and Pennsylvania, and its FERC-regulated pipeline and storage business will provide nearly 5 Bcf per day of contracted natural gas transportation capacity and 77 Bcf of fully contracted natural gas storage services.

== History ==
As one of the earliest gas utility companies in the United States, National Fuel Gas witnessed a number of technological firsts at its company or its subsidiaries. Engineers at the company discovered that depleted underground gas fields could be modified to act as storage reservoirs. Thus, the first such storage facility in the US was implemented at Zoar Field, about forty miles south of Buffalo. This turned out to be a great financial asset to NFG in the 1940s and 1950s, when skyrocketing demand for natural gas led to extensive pipelines in the eastern states being connected to new pipelines and fields in the southwestern states. NFG could thereby purchase huge quantities of cheaper summer gas from the southwest, pipe it to its New York storage fields, inject it into the ground, then retrieve it when demand and prices rose in the winter months.

The company was also the first in the industry to develop a gas-fired generator to produce electricity for cathodic protection to fight corrosion on pipelines.

In 1975, with the introduction of "Balanced Billing", the company claimed that it was "the only gas utility in the country" with a flexible plan for customers to pay bills in eleven equal monthly payments, with settlement of any overpayment or underpayment in the twelfth month. This is a modified system of installment credit.

Its headquarters was located at 10 Lafayette Square until 2002 when the company relocated to 6363 Main St in the Buffalo suburb, Williamsville.

National Fuel Gas Co. is traded on the New York Stock Exchange under the ticker symbol NFG. Its fiscal year ends September 30.

== Subsidiaries ==
National Fuel's direct, wholly owned subsidiaries include Horizon Energy Development, Inc.; Horizon LFG, Inc.; Leidy Hub, Inc.; Data-Track Account Services, Inc.; Horizon Power, Inc.; Empire Pipeline, Inc., National Fuel Gas Midstream Company, LLC and Seneca Resources Company, LLC. Highland Field Services, LLC (HFS), a subsidiary of Seneca Resources Company, LLC, was established in 2015 to address the water management needs for Seneca Resources and other oil and gas companies in the Appalachian basin. HFS currently operates multiple facilities in Pennsylvania - a water treatment plant in Kane, Pa. (Sergeant Township, McKean County) and the Clermont Storage Facility in Shippen Township, Cameron County, Pa. and additional facilities in Tioga County, Pa. HFS also manages two EPA approved injection wells in Highland Township, Elk County, Pa. Its HFS facility utilizes a zero liquid discharge process to manage, store and transport oil and gas liquid waste for reuse during drilling and hydraulic fracturing. This procedure reduces the impact on natural water resources by minimizing the need for freshwater. It is also the largest handler of produced water in the Appalachian Basin. Seneca Resources completed its divestiture of its California assets in June 2022 after 35 years of operation.
