= Rigid frame =

In structural engineering, a rigid frame is the load-resisting skeleton constructed with straight or curved members interconnected by predominantly rigid connections, which resist movements induced at the joints of members. Its members can resist bending moment, shear, and axial loads.

The two common assumptions as to the behavior of a building frame are (1) that its beams are free to rotate at their connections or (2) that its members are so connected that the angles they make with each other do not change under load. Frameworks with connections of intermediate stiffness will be intermediate between these two extremes. They are commonly called semirigid frames. The AISC specifications recognize three basic frame types: rigid frame, simple frame, and partially restrained frame.

== AISC standard ==
The AISC Steel Specification Commentary on Section B3 provides guidance for the classification of a connection in terms of its rigidity. The secant stiffness of the connection K_{s} is taken as an index property of connection stiffness. Specifically,

K_{s} = M_{s}/θ_{s}
where
M_{s} = moment at service loads, kip-in (N-mm)
θ_{s} = rotation at service loads, rads

The secant stiffness of the connection is compared to the rotational stiffness of the connected member as follows, in which L and EI are the length and bending rigidity, respectively, of the beam.

If K_{s}L/EI ≥ 20, it is acceptable to consider the connection to be fully restrained (in other words, able to maintain the angles between members). If K_{s}L/EI ≤ 2, it is acceptable to consider the connection to be simple (in other words, it rotates without developing moment). Connections with stiffnesses between these two limits are partially restrained and the stiffness, strength and ductility of the connection must be considered in the design.
