= Liberty Building (Buffalo, New York) =

Office building in Buffalo, New York

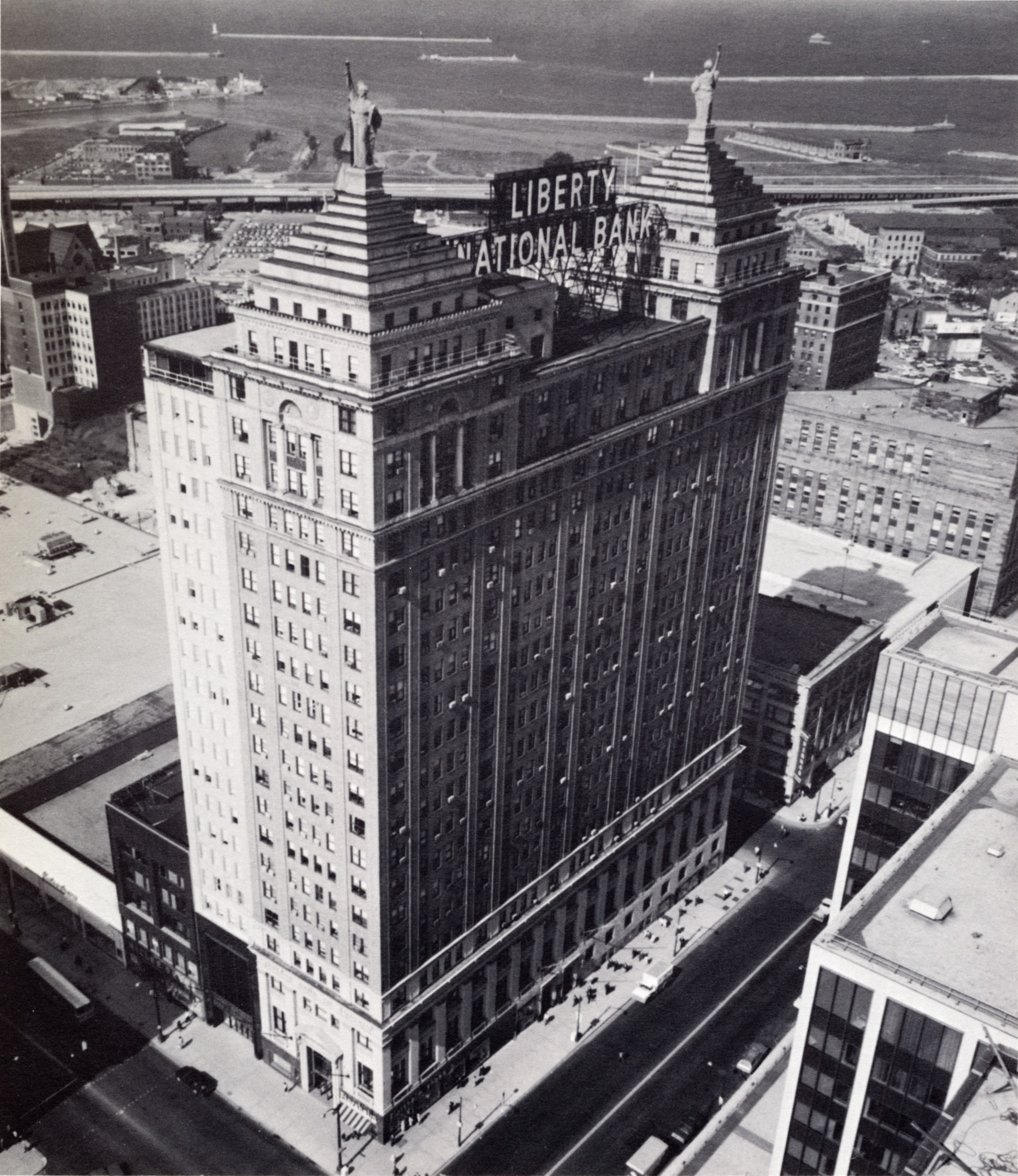
- Liberty Building, 1970

General information
- Status: Completed
- Type: Office
- Location: 424 Main St., Buffalo, New York 14202, USA
- Coordinates: 42.885595°N 78.875047°W
- Completed: 1925
- Renovated: 1961, 1999
- Owner: Main Place Liberty Group

Height
- Antenna spire: 345 ft (105 m)
- Roof: 333 ft (101 m)

Technical details
- Floor count: 23
- Lifts/elevators: 9

Design and construction
- Architect: Alfred C. Bossom

The Liberty Building is located at 420 Main Street, across the Buffalo Metro Rail from Lafayette Square in Buffalo, New York, United States.

== History ==
Built in 1925, the 23 story office tower is an example of neoclassical architecture. At the time of its completion, the Liberty Building was the largest office building in downtown Buffalo and was built for Liberty National Bank to serve as their headquarters. Liberty National Bank was originally called the German American Bank but its name was changed to Liberty National Bank after World War I to remove any connection to that war's main enemy. In order to illustrate the bank's new image, the building was christened with three replicas of the Statue of Liberty sculpted by Leo Lentelli in 1925. Two statues on the roof, one facing west, and the other facing east, represent Buffalo's strategic location on the Great Lakes. A third statue was placed over the Main Street entrance. The Main Street Statue was moved to the court street entrance. All 3 statues continue to remain in the building. They stand 36 feet tall and are illuminated at night.

An addition to the building, designed by Lyman & Associates was completed in 1961.

== Present Day ==
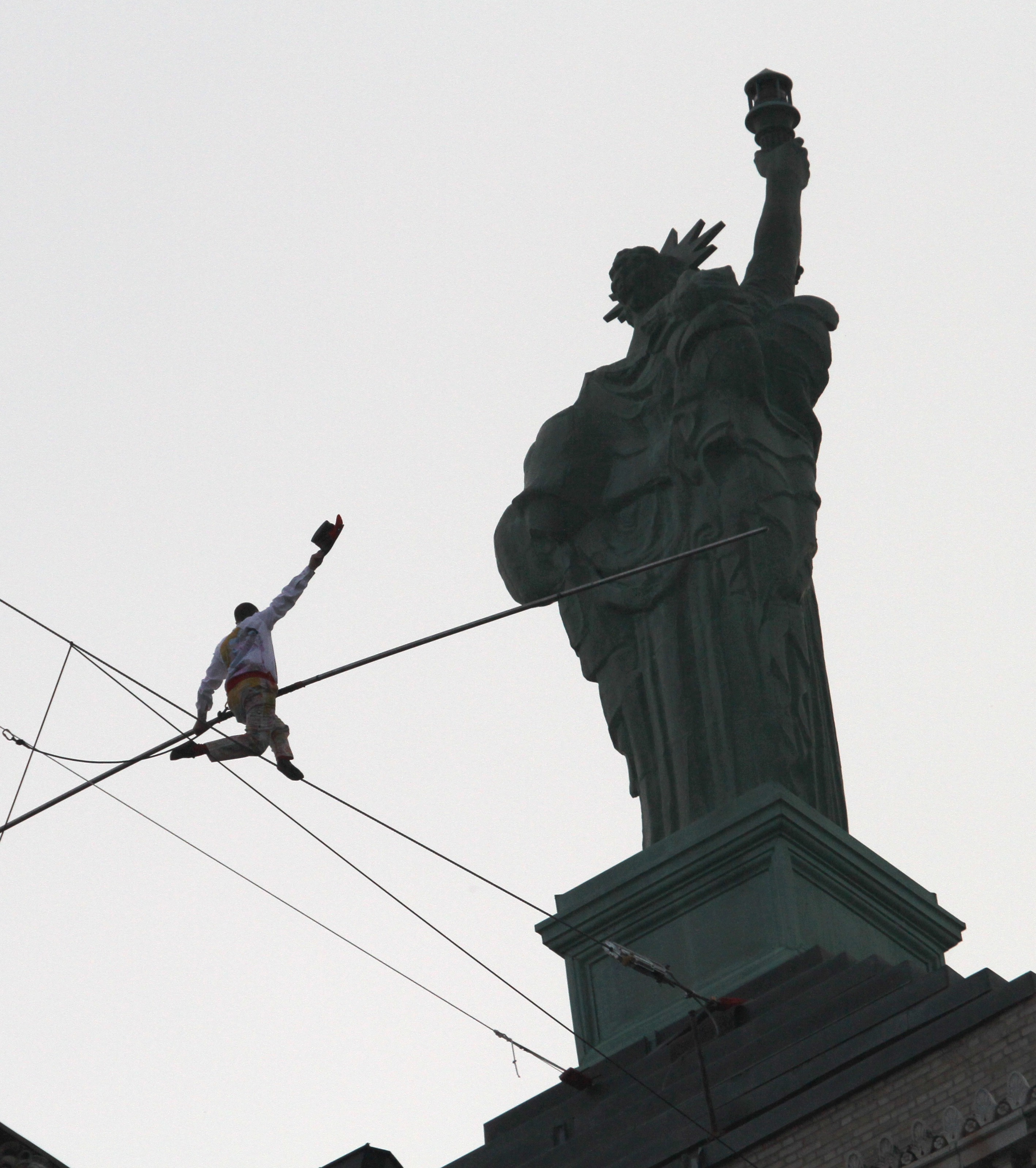
Didier Pasquette's tightrope walk

On September 23, 2010, French tightrope walker Didier Pasquette completed a successful 150 ft walk across a high-wire suspended between the two statues atop the building. He completed the walk in two minutes and 59 seconds.

The building is owned by the Main Place Liberty Group, who also own the Main Place Tower.

The Liberty Building is the fifth tallest building in Buffalo.

== Gallery ==
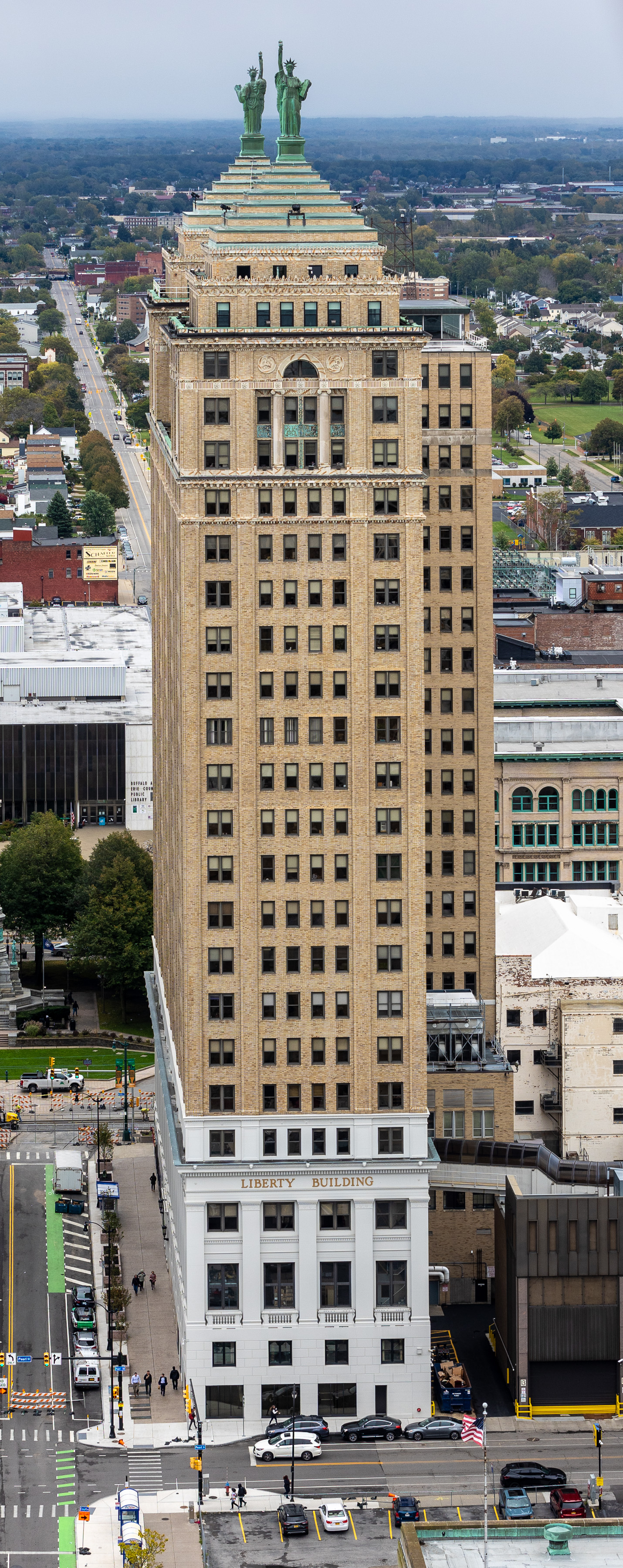

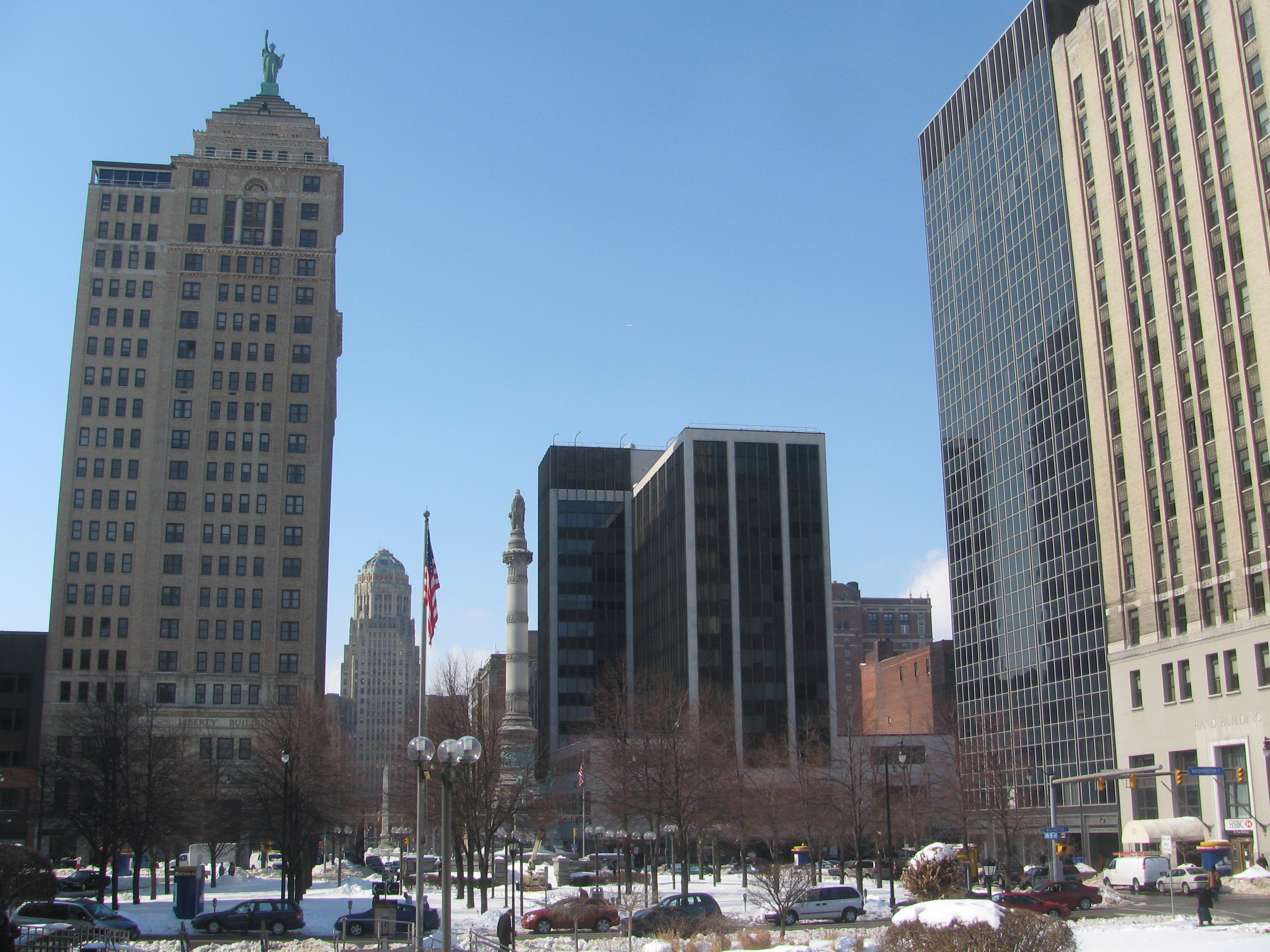

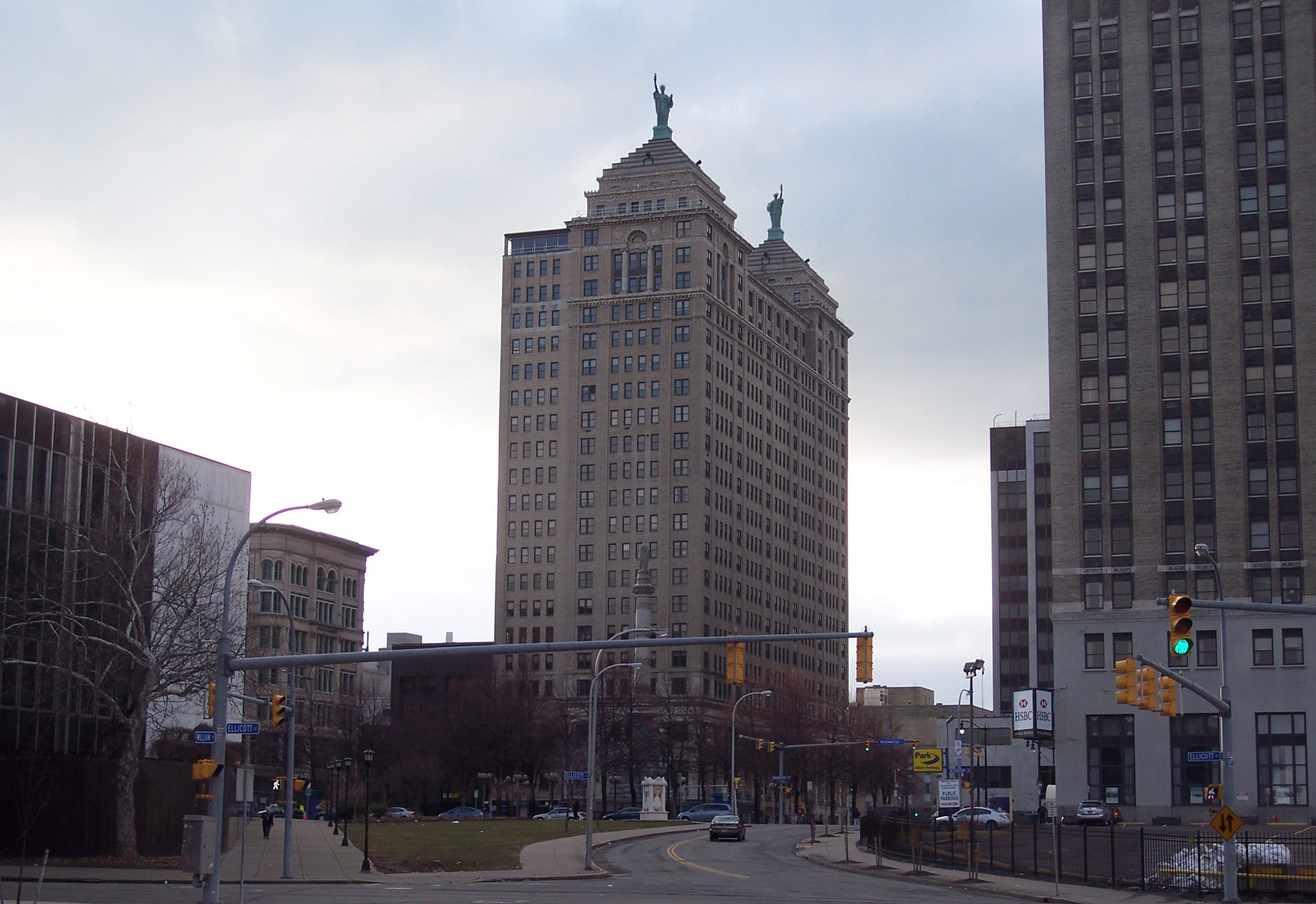

== See also ==
- List of tallest buildings in Buffalo, New York
