= List of City of Buffalo landmarks and historic districts =

This map depicts all City of Buffalo landmarks and historic districts, as of August 25, 2026. Source: Buffalo Office of Strategic Planning.

The City of Buffalo designates landmarks and historic districts to recognize and protect places of local, state, and national significance.

The NYS General Municipal Law § 119-AA enables local governmental programs for the preservation, restoration, and maintenance of the historical, architectural, archaeological, and cultural environment, and was adopted to promote a "spirit of stewardship and trusteeship for future generations."

The City of Buffalo has designated 176 local landmarks and 18 local historic districts, inclusive of about four percent of the parcels in the city. In addition to local designations, Buffalo possesses many properties that are either individually listed, or are contributing resources to historic districts, on the National Register of Historic Places (NRHP).

== Preservation Board ==
The City of Buffalo established the Preservation Board in 1976. Its powers and responsibilities are derived from Buffalo's Preservation Ordinance, which declares "as a matter of public policy that preservation, protection, conservation, enhancement, perpetuation, and utilization of sites, buildings, improvements, and districts of special character, historical or aesthetic interest, or value are necessary and required in the interest of the health, education, culture, prosperity, safety, and high quality of life of the people."

== Designation Criteria ==
The City of Buffalo designates landmarks and historic districts according to a process and criteria established in the Preservation Ordinance. The Preservation Board makes a recommendation, and the Common Council makes a decision, as to whether a proposed landmark, landmark site, or historic district meets one or more of the following criteria:

1. It has character, interest, or value as part of the development, heritage, or cultural characteristics of the city, state, or nation.
2. Its location is a site of a significant local, state, or national event.
3. It exemplifies the historic, aesthetic, architectural, archaeological, educational, economic, or cultural heritage of the city, state, or nation.
4. It is identified with a person or persons who significantly contributed to the development of the city, state, or nation.
5. It embodies distinguishing characteristics of an architectural style valuable for the study of a period, type, method of construction, or use of indigenous materials.
6. It is the work of a master builder, engineer, designer, architect, or landscape architect whose individual work has influenced the development of the city, state, or nation.
7. It embodies elements of design, detailing, materials, or craftsmanship that render it architecturally significant.
8. It embodies elements that make it structurally or architecturally innovative.
9. It is a unique location or contains singular physical characteristics that make it an established or familiar visual feature within the city.

Any structure, property, or area that meets one or more of the above criteria must also have sufficient integrity of location, design, materials, and workmanship to make it worthy of preservation or restoration.

== Project Review ==
Once the City of Buffalo has designated a landmark or historic district, the designated property or properties fall under the jurisdiction of the Preservation Board. The Preservation Board reviews exterior work only, and applies the Secretary of the Interior Standards & Guidelines in making decisions on projects.

== List of Local Landmarks ==
A landmark is a structure, object, or site, which the City of Buffalo has designated per the criteria of the Preservation Ordinance, that has been determined to possess individual local, state, and/or national significance.

#	Local Landmark	Assessment Address(es)	Adopted	Image	NRHP Status	Description	Notes
1	Blessed Trinity R.C. Church	317 Leroy Avenue	1/13/1977		Listed	Blessed Trinity Roman Catholic Church, built from 1923 to 1928 and designed by Schmill & Gould, may be the finest example of Lombard-Romanesque architecture in North America.	
2	Darwin Martin Complex	125 Jewett Parkway, 143 Jewett Parkway, 118 Summit Avenue	3/10/1977		National Historic Landmark	The Darwin D. Martin House Complex was built between 1903 and 1905 and designed by Frank Lloyd Wright. The Martin House Complex is among the most important works of Wright's Prairie School period.	
3	Gates Circle Fountain	2 Gates Circle	3/10/1977		Contributing property, Delaware Park–Front Park System	The Gates Circle Fountain, designed by E. B. Green, was erected from 1902 to 1903 in the circle known up to that point as Chapin Place. The fountain was funded by Mrs. Charles Pardee in honor of her parents, Mr. & Mrs. George B. Gates.	
4	St. Mary's Seminary	125 Edward Street	3/10/1977		Contributing property, Allentown Historic District	St. Mary's Seminary is a three and four story building with Federal and Italianate style detailing built in 1862, and occupied by the Le Couteulx St. Mary's Institute for Deaf Mutes until 1899.	
5	Franklin Square North	556 Franklin Street, 558 Franklin Street, 564 Franklin Street	3/10/1977		Contributing property, Allentown Historic District	Franklin Square North is a site consisting of the Phineas Marsh House, built in 1867 in the Italianate style; Sullivan Drullard House, built in 1862 in the Second Empire style, with a Romanesque addition built in the 1890s; and a rear carriage house.	
6	Guaranty Building (Prudential Building)	140 Pearl Street	3/30/1977		National Historic Landmark	The Guaranty Building is a skyscraper built from 1895 to 1896 and designed in the Sullivanesque style by Louis Sullivan and Dankmar Adler. The 13 story office building is among the earliest steel-supported, curtain-walled buildings ever built.	
7	Old County Hall	100 Franklin Street	4/14/1977		Listed	Old City & County Hall is a historic city hall and courthouse built from 1871 to 1875 and designed in the Late Victorian Romanesque style by Andrew Jackson Warner. The four story granite building features a 270-foot central clock tower.	
8	St. Paul's Episcopal Cathedral	12 Church Street	4/14/1977		National Historic Landmark	St. Paul's Episcopal Cathedral was built from 1849 to 1851 and designed in the Gothic Revival style by Richard Upjohn. Upjohn is said to have considered St. Paul's his best commission, and it is arguably Buffalo's first nationally noteworthy building.	
9	McKinley Monument	5 Niagara Square	5/12/1977		Eligible Contributing property, Joseph Ellicott Historic District [Certified]	The McKinley Monument is a 96-foot-tall obelisk dedicated in 1907 to the memory of President William McKinley, who was fatally shot at the Pan-American Exposition in 1901. It was conceptualized by Daniel H. Burnham and designed by Carrère & Hastings.	
10	Theodore Roosevelt Inaugural National Historic Site	641 Delaware Avenue	5/12/1977		Listed	The Theodore Roosevelt Inaugural National Historic Site is the location, at the Ansley Wilcox House, where Theodore Roosevelt took the oath of office as President of the United States on 14 September 1901.	
11	Shea's Buffalo Theatre	642 Main Street	6/9/1977		Listed	Shea's Buffalo is a movie palace, now a performing arts theater, built from 1925 to 1926 and designed by Rapp & Rapp in a combination of Spanish and French Baroque and Rococo styles, with the interior design by Louis Comfort Tiffany.	
12	Birge Mansion	2 Symphony Circle	6/14/1977		Contributing property, Allentown Historic District	The Birge Mansion was built in 1897 and designed in the Georgian Revival style by Little & Browne of Boston. It was the home of George K. Birge, founder and president of the Pierce Arrow Motor Company.	
13	St. Casimir's R.C. Church	138 Cable Street	9/8/1977		Eligible	St. Casimir's R.C. Church was built from 1926 to 1929 and designed in the Byzantine Revival style by Chester Oakley. Pope John Paul II, then the cardinal of Kraków, stayed two nights at St. Casimir's rectory in 1976.	
14	Albright-Knox Art Gallery	1285 Elmwood Avenue	11/10/1977		Listed	The Albright Knox Art Gallery is an art museum built from 1890 to 1905 and designed in a Neoclassical style (modeled after the Erechtheion) by E. B. Green, with a 1962 addition designed in the Modernist style by Gordon Bunshaft.	
15	St. Vincent de Paul R.C. Church	2021 Main Street	11/10/1977		Eligible	St. Vincent de Paul R.C. Church was built from 1924 to 1926 and designed in a Byzantine/Romanesque style by Thomas, Perry, & McMullen.	
16	The Church of the Good Shepherd	96 Jewett Parkway	11/10/1977		Contributing property, Parkside East Historic District	The Church of the Good Shepherd was built from 1887 to 1888 and designed in the Richardsonian Romanesque style by Marling & Burdett.	
17	Trinity Episcopal Church	371 Delaware Avenue	1/12/1978		Listed	Trinity Episcopal Church was built from 1884 to 1886 in a Victorian Gothic style by Cyrus K. Porter, and is best known for stained glass windows by John LaFarge and Tiffany studios. The Christ Chapel, built in 1869, is the oldest part of the complex.	
18	Asbury Methodist Church	341 Delaware Avenue	1/12/1978		Listed	The Delaware Asbury Methodist Church was built in phases from 1871 to 1876 in the Gothic Revival style by John H. Selkirk. Originally the Delaware Avenue Methodist Church, the name was changed in 1917 when it merged with the Asbury Methodist congregation.	
19	Buffalo State Asylum for the Insane	444 Forest Avenue	1/12/1978		National Historic Landmark	The Buffalo State Asylum for the Insane was built in phases from 1870 to 1895 and designed in the Richardsonian Romanesque style by Henry Hobson Richardson, with the grounds designed by Frederick Law Olmsted and Calvert Vaux.	Includes only Buildings 38, 39, 40, 42, 44, 45, 10, 9, and 12
20	Old Post Office (ECC City Campus)	70 Swan Street	1/12/1978		Listed	The Old Post Office was built from 1897 to 1901 and designed with Romanesque Revival, Chateauesque, and French Gothic features by James Knox Taylor. The building features a 244-foot tower and central light court.	
21	Buffalo City Hall	65 Niagara Square	1/12/1978		Listed	Buffalo City Hall is a 32-story government building built from 1929 to 1931 and designed in the Art Deco style by Dietel, Wade, & Jones. At 378 feet in height, it is Buffalo's second tallest building and the fourth tallest city hall in the U.S.	
22	St. Louis R.C. Church	782 Main Street	1/12/1978		Contributing property, Allentown Historic District	St. Louis R.C. Church was built from 1886 to 1889 and designed in the Gothic style by Schikel & Ditmars. The 245 foot tower is intended to recall the tower of the Cathedral of Cologne.	
23	St. John's Grace Episcopal Church	13 Bidwell Parkway	2/9/1978		Contributing property, Elmwood Historic District–West	St. John's Grace Episcopal Church was built from 1925 to 1927 and designed in the English Perpendicular Gothic style by Mayers, Murray, & Philip with Bertram Grosvenor Goodhue.	
24	Lafayette Avenue Presbyterian Church	598 Lafayette Avenue	2/9/1978		Contributing property, Elmwood Historic District–East	Lafayette Avenue Presbyterian Church was built from 1894 to 1896 and designed in the Romanesque Revival style by Lansing & Beierl. Bouck Street was renamed to Lafayette Avenue in honor of the church.	
25	Central Park United Methodist Church	216 Morris Avenue	2/9/1978		Eligible	The Central Park United Methodist Church was built from 1921 to 1923 and designed in the Perpendicular Gothic style by Charles Bolton & Sons.	
26	First Presbyterian Church	393 Pennsylvania Avenue	2/9/1978		Contributing property, Allentown Historic District	First Presbyterian Church was built from 1889 to 1891 and designed in the Richardsonian Romanesque style by Green & Wicks. Its offset, 163 foot tall tower is the predominant visual feature looking south along Olmsted's Richmond Avenue.	
27	Unitarian Universalist Church	646 West Ferry Street	3/9/1978		Listed	The Unitarian Universalist Church was built from 1904 to 1906 and designed in the English Perpendicular Gothic style by Edward Austin Kent. The Buffalo Nine, a group of Vietnam War protestors, were arrested at the church on 19 August 1968.	
28	Market Arcade	615 Main Street	5/11/1978		Eligible Contributing property, Theatre Historic District [Certified]	The Market Arcade was built in 1892 and designed in the Neoclassical/Beaux Arts style by Green & Wicks. Buffalo's only historic covered shopping arcade connected Main Street to the Chippewa Market.	
29	Lafayette Square	415 Main Street	5/11/1978		Eligibility undetermined: Lafayette Square Eligible: Soldiers & Sailors Monument	Lafayette Square, named Court House Square until 1879, was laid out by Joseph Ellicott in his 1804 city plan. Mayor Grover Cleveland laid the cornerstone for the Soldiers & Sailors Monument in 1882.	
30	Dun Building	110 Pearl Street	5/11/1978		Eligible Contributing property, Joseph Ellicott Historic District [Certified]	The Dun Building is a 10-story office building built from 1894 to 1895 and designed in the Neoclassical style by Green & Wicks. Robert Graham Dunn, for whom the highrise was built, founded the R.G. Dun & Company, predecessor to Dun & Bradstreet.	
31	Courier-Express Building	785 Main Street	5/11/1978		Eligible Contributing property, Theatre Historic District [Certified]	The Courier Express Building was built from 1929 to 1930 and designed in the Art Deco style by Monks & Johnson. The Buffalo Courier Express was a daily newspaper published from 1926 to 1982.	
32	Polish Singing Circle Building	1168 Broadway	5/11/1978		Eligible	The Polish Singing Circle Building was designed by Władysław Zawadzki. The Polish Singing Circle was organized in 1897 and occupied this building starting in 1916.	
33	Lafayette High School	348 Lafayette Avenue	9/14/1978		Listed	Lafayette High School was built from 1901 to 1903 and designed in the Renaissance Revival style by Esenwein & Johnson.	
34	Connecticut Street Armory	781 Niagara Street	9/14/1978		Listed	The Connecticut Street Armory is a New York Army National Guard facility built from 1897 to 1899 and designed in a Richardsonian Romanesque style by Williams Lansing with Isaac G. Perry.	
35	St. John the Baptist R.C. Church	62 Hertel Avenue	10/12/1978		Eligible	St. John the Baptist R.C. Church was built from 1925 to 1927 and designed in the Italian Romanesque style by Oakley & Schallmo.	
36	St. Francis de Sales R.C. Church	575 Humboldt Parkway	10/12/1978		Contributing property, Hamlin Park Historic District	St. Francis de Sales R.C. Church was built from 1926 to 1927 and designed in an Italian Romanesque Revival style by Murphy & Olmsted with George J. Dietel.	
37	Orrin Foster Mansion	891 Delaware Avenue	10/12/1978		Eligible Contributing property, Linwood Historic District [Certified]	The Orrin Foster Mansion was built from 1903 to 1905 and designed in the Mediterranean Revival style by Frank M. Chappelle. It is associated with patent medicine manufacturer Orrin Foster.	
38	Durham Memorial AME Zion Church	170 East Eagle Street	1/11/1979		Listed	The Durham Memorial African Methodist Episcopal Zion Church was built in 1922 and designed by Louis Greenstein. Founded as St. Luke's AME Zion Church, it is the oldest surviving building associated with the Buffalo AME Zion congregations.	
39	New York Central Terminal	495 Paderewski Drive	2/8/1979		Listed	Buffalo Central Terminal is a 17-story former railroad station built from 1925 to 1929 and designed in the Art Deco style by Fellheimer & Wagner. It ceased operations as a railroad station in 1979.	Includes only the Central Terminal Tower and Concourse
40	Lafayette Hotel	391 Washington Street	4/12/1979		Listed	The Lafayette Hotel is a seven-story hotel built in phases between 1902 and 1926 and designed in the French Renaissance style by Bethune, Bethune, & Fuchs. Louise Blanchard Bethune was the first registered female architect in the U.S.	
41	158 Swan Street	158 Swan Street	7/12/1979			N/A	Demolished
42	159 Swan Street	159 Swan Street	7/12/1979			N/A	Demolished; Includes only the original rowhouse site at the former 159 Swan
43	Buffalo History Museum	25 Nottingham Court	7/12/1979		National Historic Landmark	The Buffalo Historical Society, built from 1900 to 1901 and designed in a Neoclassical style by George Cary, was the only permanent building constructed for the Pan-American Exposition.	
44	Colored Musicians Club	145 Broadway	9/13/1979		Listed	145 Broadway has been the home of the Colored Musicians Club, a historic jazz institution of national renown, since 1935. The building was constructed in 1910 and designed by Joseph Geigand.	
45	IRC Building	847 Main Street	10/11/1979		Delisted 1 Jan 1981	N/A	Demolished (formerly 855 Main)
46	St. Mary's on the Hill Episcopal Church	783 Niagara Street	12/13/1979			N/A	Demolished
47	St. Mary's R.C. Church Complex	215 Broadway, 217 Broadway	2/14/1980		Eligible: St. Mary's Lyceum	St. Mary's Lyceum, all that remains of the St. Mary's R.C. Church Complex, was built in 1909 and designed in a Neoclassical style. The architect is not known.	St. Mary's R.C. Church was destroyed by fire in 1986; St. Mary's Convent was demolished in 1990
48	Engine No. 28	1170 Lovejoy Street	4/10/1980		Listed	Engine No. 28 is a firehouse built in 1897 and designed in the Queen Anne style by Frederick Mohr.	
49	Episcopal Church Home (Thornton Building and Hutchinson Chapel)	825 Busti Avenue	8/14/1980		Eligible: Hutchinson Chapel	The Hutchinson Chapel was built in 1895 and designed in the Gothic Revival style by W.A. Archer. It is all that remains of the Episcopal Church Home Complex.	Thornton Building demolished, only Hutchinson Chapel remains standing
50	Little Harlem Hotel	494 Michigan Avenue	9/11/1980			N/A	Demolished
51	Kleinhans Music Hall	360 Pennsylvania Avenue	10/9/1980		National Historic Landmark	Kleinhans Music Hall was built from 1938 to 1940 and designed in the International Style by Eero & Eliel Saarinen. Among others, Margaret Truman, Martin Luther King Jr., and Robert F. Kennedy have performed or spoken there.	
52	Knights of Columbus	498 Delaware Avenue	11/13/1980		Contributing property, Allentown Historic District	The Knights of Columbus was built in about 1870 as the home of Chillion M. Farrar. The Knights of Columbus occupied the building in 1916.	
53	Fosdick Masten High School	186 East North Street, 161 Best Street, 180 East North Street	3/12/1981		Listed	Fosdick Masten High School, now known as City Honors School, was built from 1912 to 1914 and designed in the Beaux Arts style by Esenwein & Johnson.	
54	St. Andrew's Evangelical Lutheran Church	175 Sherman Street, 212 Peckham Street	3/12/1981		Listed	St. Andrew's Evangelical Lutheran Church was built from 1884 to 1885 and designed by L. Saenger.	
55	Delaware Avenue Baptist Church	965 Delaware Avenue	7/9/1981		Eligible Contributing property, Linwood Historic District [Certified]	The Delaware Avenue Baptist Church was built from 1894 to 1895 and designed in the Romanesque Revival style by John H. Coxhead.	
56	Hook & Ladder No. 3	308 Spring Street	7/9/1981			N/A	Demolished (now part of 412 William)
57	Wood Row Houses	17 Emerson Place	9/10/1981		Delisted 20 May 1988		Demolished
58	Wood Row Houses	29 Emerson Place	9/10/1981		Listed	Built in 1894, this is part of a series of wood frame row house developments built in Cold Spring, the only Buffalo neighborhood with a significant concentration of such buildings.	
59	Wood Row Houses	75, 77, 79, & 81 Woodlawn Avenue	9/10/1981		Listed	Built in 1897, this is part of a series of wood frame row house developments built in Cold Spring, the only Buffalo neighborhood with a significant concentration of such buildings.	
60	Wood Row Houses	147 Woodlawn Avenue	9/10/1981			N/A	Demolished
61	Wood Row Houses	210, 214, & 218 Glenwood Avenue	9/10/1981			N/A	Demolished
62	Wood Row Houses	1335 Michigan Avenue	9/10/1981		Listed	N/A	Never formally delisted from the NRHP despite having been demolished in 1997
63	St. Mary of Sorrows R.C. Church	938 Genesee Street	1/23/1986		Listed	St. Mary of Sorrows R.C. Church was built from 1887 to 1891 and designed in the Rhenish Romanesque style by Adolphus Druiding.	
64	Buffalo Lighthouse	1 Fuhrmann Boulevard	5/8/1986		Listed	The Buffalo Lighthouse, also called the Buffalo Main Light, was built in 1833 and deactivated in 1914. The 1961 effort to save the lighthouse was the starting point for the preservation movement in Buffalo.	
65	Holy Mother of the Rosary Cathedral	182 Sobieski Street	6/12/1986		Eligible	Holy Mother of the Rosary Cathedral was built from 1900 to 1906 and designed in a Gothic Revival style by Sidney Woodruff. It is now Masjid Zakariya.	
66	Rohlfs House	156 Park Street	3/31/1987		Contributing property, Allentown Historic District	The Rohlfs House was built in 1912 and designed in the Craftsman style by Hudson & Colson. The house is associated with Charles and Anna Katherine Green Rohlfs, noted furniture designer and writer of detective stories, respectively.	
67	Hellenic Orthodox Church of the Annunciation	1000 Delaware Avenue	3/31/1987		Listed	The Hellenic Orthodox Church of the Annunciation, originally known as North Presbyterian Church, was built in 1906 and designed in a Gothic Revival style by George F. Newton. It became the Hellenic Orthodox Church of the Annunciation in 1952.	
68	Niagara Falls Boulevard	--	9/29/1987		N/A	Niagara Falls Boulevard, between Main Street and Kenmore Avenue, was built in 1913 and surfaced with brick.	Public ROW between Main/Kenmore
69	Promiseland Baptist Church	215 High Street	2/2/1988		Eligible	Promiseland Baptist Church was built in 1883 and designed in a Gothic Revival style with Eastlake elements. The church was originally occupied by the Third German Baptist Church.	
70	Former M&T Bank (Broadway/Mills Branch)	1036 Broadway	5/10/1988		Eligible Contributing property, Broadway Fillmore Historic District [Certified]	The M&T Bank Broadway/Mills Branch was built from 1923 to 1924 and designed in the Neoclassical style by Bley & Lyman. It is identical to the M&T Bank Grant-Boyd Branch completed in 1923.	
71	Hayes Hall Complex	3425 Main Street	10/18/1988		Listed: Hayes Hall Eligible: Hayes Annex D, Wende Hall, Townsend Hall, Beck Hall Eligibility undetermined: Grounds	The Hayes Hall Complex include five of the earliest buildings of the University at Buffalo South Campus, and their landscaped grounds. The oldest building is Hayes Hall, built from 1874 to 1879 as the Erie County Alms House and Poor Farm.	Includes only Hayes Hall, Hayes Annex D, Wende Hall, Townsend Hall, Beck Hall, and their grounds
72	Fisherman's Wharf	64 West Chippewa Street	2/21/1989			N/A	Demolished
73	Plymouth Methodist Church & Parsonage	443 Porter Avenue, 453 Porter Avenue	3/28/1989		Contributing property, Fargo Estate Historic District	The Plymouth Methodist Church & Parsonage were built from 1911 to 1912 and in 1889, respectively, and designed by Cyrus K. Porter & Sons.	
74	Boarding House Restaurant	140 Seneca Street	6/27/1989		Eligible	140 Seneca Street is a three-story brick Italianate commercial block built in about 1865.	
75	St. Vincent's Female Orphan Asylum Complex	1313 Main Street, 1140 Ellicott Street	7/25/1989		Eligibility undetermined	The St. Vincent's Female Orphan Asylum includes the Robinson-Squier House, built c. 1860; Orphanage, built from 1898 to 1899 and designed by Green & Wicks; G. Barrett Rich House, built c. 1890; and Gymnasium, built in 1935 and designed by George Dietel.	
76	Great Northern Elevator	8 City Ship Canal	4/10/1990		Not eligible	The Great Northern Elevator, built in 1897 and designed by engineer Max Toltz, is an outstanding example of an intermediate steel grain elevator, and is believed to be the sole surviving "brick box" elevator in North America.	Only the Great Northern Elevator is subject to the landmark nomination. The Great Northern Elevator was demolished from 2022 to 2023.
77	Calumet Building	233 Franklin Street	11/13/1990		Listed	The Calumet Building, built in 1906 and designed by Esenwein & Johnson, is the most exuberant example of glazed architectural terra cotta in Buffalo.	
78	Buffalo Gas Light Works	257 West Genesee Street	12/23/1991		Listed	The Buffalo Gas Light Works was built in 1859 and designed in the Romanesque Revival style by John H. Selkirk, Buffalo's first architect.	
79	Marine Hospital (former UB Chronic Disease Institute)	2211 Main Street	1/21/1992		Eligible	The Marine Hospital was built in 1909 and designed in the French Renaissance style by James Knox Taylor.	
80	Buffalo Savings Bank	2/18/1992	18 Feb 1992		Eligible	The Buffalo Savings Bank, built in 1901 and designed by Green & Wicks, is among the most outstanding examples of neoclassicism in Buffalo. The building marked more than half a century of growth of Buffalo's first savings institution.	
81	Saints Peter & Paul Orthodox Church	40 Benzinger Street	9/15/1992		Listed	Saints Peter & Paul Orthodox Church was built from 1932 to 1933 and designed in a Byzantine Revival style by Joseph E. Fronczak.	
82	Breckenridge Street Church (First Presbyterian Church of Black Rock)	44 Breckenridge Street	9/29/1992		Eligible Contributing property, Upper Black Rock Historic District [Certified]	The Breckenridge Street Church, built in 1827, is an outstanding example of the Federal style, rare in Buffalo, and the only Federal church surviving in Buffalo.	
83	60 Hedley Place	60 Hedley Place	12/8/1992		Listed	60 Hedley Place is a vernacular farm house with Greek Revival characteristics built in about 1850.	
84	Parkside Lutheran Church	101 Linden Avenue	12/8/1992		Eligibility undetermined	Parkside Lutheran Church was built from 1924 to 1925 and designed in the Tudor Gothic Revival style by Frank A. Spangenberg.	
85	Transfiguration R.C. Church	929 Sycamore Street	7/12/1994		Eligible	Transfiguration R.C. Church was built in 1896 and designed in the Gothic Revival style by Karl G. Schmill.	
86	St. Vincent de Paul Rectory (Martin Hall)	15 Eastwood Place	2/21/1995		Eligible	St. Vincent de Paul Rectory was built from 1913 to 1914 and designed in the Renaissance Revival style by Max G. Beierl.	
87	Jefferson Street Shul	407 Jefferson Avenue	5/27/1997			N/A	Demolished
88	Engine No. 2/Hook & Ladder No. 9	310 Jersey Street	6/9/1998		Listed	Engine No. 2/Hook & Ladder No. 9 is a Second Empire style firehouse built in phases in 1875 and 1897 and designed in the Second Empire style by Cyrus K. Porter and Eckel & Ackerman, respectively.	
89	Swannie House	170 Ohio Street	2/23/1999		Eligible	The Swannie House, built in 1893 by James Swannie, is one of Buffalo's oldest taverns and an important landmark of Buffalo's industrial waterfront.	
90	Rev. J. Edward Nash Sr. House	36 Nash Street	2/20/2001		Listed	The Rev. J. Edward Nash Sr. House is a vernacular house built in 1893 and best associated with the Rev. Nash, pastor of the Michigan Street Baptist Church from 1892 to 1953. Nash lived in the house from 1925 to 1957.	
91	Carlton Ladd House	11 Plymouth Avenue	7/8/2003		Contributing property, Allentown Historic District	The Carlton Ladd House is a two and one-half story single unit dwelling built in 1887 and designed in a vernacular Queen Anne style by builder Richard Caudell. Carlton T. Ladd, the first owner, was a supervisor with the Watson Elevator.	
92	Dellenbaugh Block	163 Broadway, 167 Broadway	3/22/2005		Listed	The Dellenbaugh Block is a series of four interconnected structures built from 1842 to 1922. Frederick Dellenbaugh, a prominent German immigrant, built the 1842 Federal Style house.	
93	Park Lane Condominiums	771 Lafayette Avenue	9/12/2006		Listed	The Park Lane Condominiums, originally called the Parke Apartments, is a ten-story building built from 1924 to 1925 and designed in the Second Renaissance Revival style by H.L. Stevens & Company.	
94	School 46/Elmwood Park	149 Edward Street, 175 Edward Street	9/2/2008		Contributing property, Allentown Historic District	School 46, built in 1888 and designed by H.H. Little, is the oldest continually operating public school in Buffalo.	
95	607 Jefferson Avenue	607 Jefferson Avenue	9/15/2009		Eligibility undetermined	607 Jefferson Avenue is a two and one half story, front gable mixed use building built in about 1860. A rescue mission of the Volunteers of America once occupied the site.	
96	609 Jefferson Avenue	609 Jefferson Avenue	9/15/2009		Eligibility undetermined	609 Jefferson Avenue is a two and one half story, front gable Queen Anne style residence built in about 1890. A rescue mission of the Volunteers of America once occupied the site.	
97	Wilkeson-Storms House	771 Busti Avenue	10/13/2009			N/A	Demolished
98	Buffum Street Site	129 Buffum Street	11/29/2011		Eligibility undetermined	The Buffum Street Site is an archaeologically significant as a prehistoric Wenro and Seneca settlement.	
99	Erie Freight House	9 South Street	1/10/2012			N/A	Demolished
100	Buffalo Terminal House	2280 Niagara Street	7/10/2012		Eligibility undetermined	The Buffalo Terminal House was built by the Cataract Power and Conduit Company in 1901 as a transformer building for alternating current electric power transmitted from Niagara Falls.	
101	St. Ann R.C. Church & Shrine	651 Broadway, 371 Watson Street, 466 Emslie Street, 468 Emslie Street	11/12/2013		Eligible: St. Ann's Rectory, 371 Watson Eligibility undetermined: 651 Broadway, 466 Emslie Street, 468 Emslie Street	The St. Ann R.C. Church & Shrine is a complex of three buildings dating between 1878 and 1895. The 1878 church was designed in the Gothic Revival style by Francis Himpler. The school, built in 1895, was once the largest in the Buffalo diocese.	
102	Wende House	2256 Bailey Avenue	9/1/2015		Eligibility undetermined	The Wende House was built in about 1870 and designed in an Italianate style. The house is associated with Gottfried H. Wende, an attorney and politician for whom the adjacent Wende Street is named.	
103	Fosdick Masten High School Great Lawn	172 East North Street	5/9/2016		Eligibility undetermined	The Fosdick Masten High School Great Lawn encompasses the entirely of the site of what is now City Honors School, originally occupied by a Potter's Field and later redesigned by Frederick Law Olmsted as Masten Place.	
104	North Park Branch Library	2351 Delaware Avenue	3/21/2017		Listed	The North Park Branch Library was built from 1928 to 1929 and designed in the Tudor Revival style by Howard Beck.	
105	John C. Lord Cottage	794 Potomac Avenue	4/18/2017		Contributing property, Elmwood Historic District–East	The John C. Lord Cottage, built sometime between 1866 and 1872, is one of the oldest surviving buildings in the Elmwood Village.	
106	224 Plymouth Avenue	224 Plymouth Avenue	11/28/2017		Eligible	224 Plymouth Avenue is a Greek Revival front gable house built in about 1850.	
107	Wildroot Building	1740 Bailey Avenue	2/6/2018		Eligible	The Wildroot Building, originally built for Grennan Bakeries in 1929 and expanded for Wildroot in 1946, was the longtime home of the iconic hair tonic manufacturer.	
108	82 Allenhurst Road	82 Allenhurst Road	3/6/2018		Contributing property, University Park Historic District	82 Allenhurst Road, built in 1921 by developer Anthony Huck, is an exceptional example of a craftsman bungalow in the University Park “planned" neighborhood.	
109	Knapp Building	238 Carlton Street	4/17/2018		Eligible	The Knapp Building, built in about 1876 by grocer Peter Knapp, is a rare surviving example of an Italianate mixed-use building in the Fruit Belt neighborhood.	
110	Kensington Evangelical Lutheran Church	983 Kensington Avenue	5/15/2018		Eligible	Kensington Evangelical Lutheran Church, now the New Testament Revival Cathedral, was built from 1926 to 1927 and designed in the Perpendicular Gothic style by Charles F. Obenhock.	
111	General Electric Tower	20 East Huron Street	5/15/2018		Listed	The General Electric Tower is among the most familiar and identifiable features of the Buffalo skyline. The 14 story, 294-foot tall office building was built from 1911 to 1912 and designed in the Beaux Arts style by Esenwein & Johnson.	
112	Masten Avenue Armory	188 East North Street	5/29/2018		Eligible	The Masten Avenue Armory is a New York Army National Guard facility built in 1933 and designed in a Tudor Revival style by William E. Haugaard.	
113	Bennett High School & All High Stadium	2837 Main Street	5/29/2018		Eligible	Bennett High School is a public high school built from 1923 to 1925 and designed in a Georgian Revival style by the Associated Buffalo Architects. All High Stadium was built in 1928 and designed in a neoclassical style by Ernest Crimi.	
114	Michigan Street Baptist Church	511 Michigan Avenue	6/12/2018		Listed	The Michigan Street Baptist Church, built from 1845 and 1849, is Buffalo's oldest remaining African American church structure. It is significant for its association with the Abolition, Underground Railroad, and African American civil rights movements.	
115	Grover Cleveland High School	100 Fourteenth Street	6/12/2018		Eligible	Grover Cleveland High School was built from 1913 to 1914 and designed in a Georgian Revival style by architect Herman W. Hoefer. It was originally built as the Buffalo State Normal School, and taken over by the Buffalo Board of Education in 1931.	
116	Kensington High School	319 Suffolk Street	6/26/2018		Eligible	Kensington High School is a public high school built from 1934 to 1937 and designed in the Art Deco style by Daniel G. McNeil. The school was funded by the Public Works Administration, a New Deal program established in 1933.	
117	Riverside High School	51 Ontario Street	6/26/2018		Eligible	Riverside High School is a public high school built from 1928 to 1930 and designed in a neoclassicial style by F.J. & W.A. Kidd.	
118	Engine No. 26	693 Tonawanda Street	6/26/2018		Eligible	Engine No. 26 is a firehouse built from 1894 to 1895 and designed in the Chateauesque style by Frederick W. Humble. Robert B. Howard, Buffalo's first African American firefighter and Fire Commissioner, served as captain of Engine No. 26 from 1960 to 1966.	
119	Concrete Central Elevator	175 Buffalo River	7/10/2018		Listed	Concrete Central Elevator, built from 1915 to 1917 and designed by Harry R. Wait of the Monarch Engineering Company, is Buffalo's largest grain elevator and was the largest in the world when it was completed.	
120	East High School	794 Northampton Street	7/24/2018		Eligible	East High School is a public high school built from 1925 to 1927 and designed in a neoclassical style by architects F.J. & W.A. Kidd.	
121	Cargill Superior Elevator	2 Buffalo River	7/24/2018		Eligible	Cargill Superior Elevator is a grain elevator complex built from 1914 to 1925 in phases: Elevator A, B, and C. With a 3.7 million bushel capacity, it is among Buffalo's largest elevators. Elevator A was the city's first of slip form concrete construction.	
122	341 Franklin Street	341 Franklin Street	10/30/2018		Not eligible	341 Franklin Street is a mixed-use building constructed in about 1854.	
123	Samuel Schenck House	3451 Bailey Avenue	11/13/2018		Eligible	The Samuel Schenck House may be Buffalo's oldest house still located at its original site. The house was built from 1822 to 1823 by Mennonite migrants Michael and Samuel Schenck in what was then the Town of Amherst, now Grover Cleveland Park.	
124	Wonder Bread Factory	356 Fougeron Street	11/13/2018		Listed	The Wonder Bread Factory is an industrial bakery built from 1914 to 1915 and designed by Corry B. Comstock. The plant, closed in 2004, is associated with Ward & Ward Incorporated and the Continental Baking Company, maker of Wonder Bread and Hostess Cakes.	
125	Engine No. 22	1522 Broadway	11/13/2018		Eligible	Engine No. 22 was built from 1890 to 1891 and designed in the Romanesque Revival style by August C. Esenwein. It is the city's second oldest continually operating firehouse, and may be the oldest surviving Esenwein designed building in Buffalo.	
126	Burgard Vocational High School	368 Kensington Avenue	11/13/2018		Not eligible	Burgard Vocational High School was built from 1929 to 1930 and designed in an Art Deco style with Collegiate Gothic elements by Ernest Crimi.	
127	Sweet House	246 Jersey Street	12/11/2018		Contributing property, Fargo Estate Historic District	The Sweet House was built in about 1880 and designed in the Victorian Gothic style by Holmes & Little. It was originally built for baby carriage manufacturer Joseph Buffum Sweet.	
128	Engine No. 19	209 Forest Avenue	12/11/2018		Eligible	Engine No. 19 was built from 1887 to 1888 and designed by Hugh Macdiarmid in an Italianate style with Eastlake detailing. It is the oldest continually operating firehouse in the City of Buffalo.	
129	Near-Lewis House	1029 West Avenue	4/2/2019		Not eligible	The Near-Lewis House, built in about 1865, is a one story, cross gabled, vernacular workers cottage designed with Italianate style elements.	
130	Ford Motor Company Fuhrmann Plant	901 Fuhrmann Boulevard	4/16/2019		Eligible	The Ford Motor Company Fuhrmann Plant is an automobile assembly plant built from 1930 to 1931 and designed by Albert Kahn & Associates. About two million automobiles were made at the plant prior to its 1958 closure.	
131	Public School 18	75 School Street	5/14/2019		Eligible	Public School 18 is a public school built from 1939 to 1941 and designed in an Art Moderne style by Daniel G. McNeil.	
132	Public School 38	360 Vermont Street	5/14/2019		Not eligible	Public School 38 is a public school built from 1952 to 1954 and designed in the International Style by James William Kideney & Associates.	
133	Gethsemane Missionary Baptist Church	55 Grape Street	10/1/2019		Eligibility undetermined	Gethsemane Missionary Baptist Church (originally St. Paul's Evangelical Lutheran Church) is a complex built in phases from 1875 to 1989. After 1962, the church under Rev. Herbert V. Reid became Buffalo's most active in the fight for racial justice.	
134	Stritzinger Building	871 Seneca Street	10/15/2019		Eligibility undetermined	The Stritzinger Building, a commercial block built by Anton Stritzinger as a saloon by 1893, is a prominent and familiar visual feature of the Hydraulics neighborhood.	
135	William R. Heath House	76 Soldiers Place	3/17/2020		Contributing property, Elmwood Historic District–East	The William R. Heath House is a single unit house built from 1903 to 1905 and designed in the Prairie Style by Frank Lloyd Wright.	
136	Walter V. Davidson House	57 Tillinghast Place	3/17/2020		Contributing property, Parkside East Historic District	The Walter V. Davidson House is a single unit house built in 1908 and designed in the Prairie Style by Frank Lloyd Wright.	
137	Police Station No. 13	348 Austin Street	10/13/2020		Listed	Police Station No. 13 was built from 1894 to 1895 and designed by Frederick C.H. Mohr in the Romanesque Revival style.	
138	Concordia Cemetery & Farmhouse	438 Walden Avenue	10/27/2020		Listed	Concordia Cemetery was established in 1859 by three German Lutheran churches. The farmhouse, used as a cemetery office, predates its establishment.	
139	Engine No. 16	1416 Main Street	12/22/2020		Eligible	Engine No. 16 was built from 1884 to 1885 and designed by Hugh Macdiarmid in an Italianate style with Eastlake detailing. It is the oldest surviving firehouse erected by the Buffalo Fire Department.	
140	Monroe Building	1786 Main Street & 1040 Lafayette Avenue	3/16/2021		Listed	The Monroe Building was built in 1920 and designed G. Morton Wolfe as the showroom and service station for the Monroe Motor Car Company, part of Buffalo’s “Automobile Row” on Main Street during the early 20th century.	
141	1762 & 1766 Main Street	1762 & 1766 Main Street	3/16/2021		Eligible: 1762 Main Street Eligibility undetermined: 1766 Main Street	1762 and 1766 Main Street were built in 1899 and circa 1920, respectively, with the prior designed by Louise Blanchard Bethune as a meat market for Henry Bald. From the late 1960s to 1974, 1762 Main Street was home to the Buffalo Black Drama Workshop.	
142	Spolka Building	436 Amherst Street	6/8/2021		Not eligible	The Spolka Building is a commercial block constructed from 1916 to 1917 by the Polish American Building Company for tailor Jacob F. Bujarek, and later occupied by men’s clothier Spolka.	
143	516 Amherst Street	516 Amherst Street	6/8/2021		Not eligible	516 Amherst Street is a former meat shop and dwelling constructed by 1909, and is typical to Buffalo's early twentieth century immigrant neighborhoods.	
144	Blessed Sacrament R.C. Church Complex	1025 & 1035 Delaware Avenue	7/6/2021		Eligible	Blessed Sacrament R.C. Church Complex is a series of buildings designed by Adolphus Druiding, Albert A. Post, Aristide Leonori, and Edgar E. Joralemon. They are fine examples of Gothic Revival ecclesiastical architecture and Beaux Arts residential architecture, respectively.	
145	West Avenue Presbyterian Church	926 West Avenue	11/16/2021		Eligibility undetermined	West Avenue Presbyterian Church was built in 1891 and designed in the Richardsonian Romanesque style by architect Edward A. Kent. Kent is notable as the lone Buffalonian to die in the sinking of the RMS Titanic.	
146	Fedders Manufacturing Company Factory	31, 57, and 71 Tonawanda Street	12/14/2021		Listed	The Fedders Manufacturing Company Factory was built from 1907 to 1928 and the longtime home of a manufacturer of automobile heating and air conditioning products.	
147	Charles G. Curtiss Company Malt House	1100 Niagara Street	1/25/2022		Eligible	The Charles G. Curtiss Company Malt House was built about 1898 as a malt house. It was later associated with the Fleischmann Company and Cooperative GLF Exchange, Inc.	
148	St. Adalbert R.C. Church	208 Stanislaus Street	10/4/2022		Eligible	St. Adalbert R.C. Church was built from 1890 to 1891 and designed in the Romanesque style by Raymond Huber. The parish established in 1886 was the second Polish Roman Catholic parish in Buffalo.	
149	American Grain Complex	139 Buffalo River and 3 Lot Lines	9/3/2024		Listed	The American Grain Complex, constructed in phases from 1905 to 1931, physically represents Buffalo’s history of grain transportation, handling, storage, uses, and associated technologies throughout the 20th century.	
150	South Side Bank of Buffalo	2221 Seneca Street	9/17/2024		Listed	The South Side Bank of Buffalo was built in 1921 and designed in the Sullivanesque style by Harold Jewett Cook.	
151	St. John Kanty R.C. Church Complex	101 Swinburne Street	10/29/2024		Listed	The St. John Kanty R.C. Church Complex is a multiple building complex erected from 1891 to 1966 and located on Broadway between Swinburne Street and Brownell Street in Buffalo’s East Side.	
152	Our Lady of Perpetual Help R.C. Church Complex	125 O'Connell Avenue	10/29/2024		Eligible	Our Lady of Perpetual Help R.C. Church was built from 1897 to 1900 and designed in the Gothic Revival style by Lansing & Beierl.	
153	St. Stanislaus R.C. Church Complex	348 Peckham Street, 540 Fillmore Avenue, 142 Wilson Street, and 389 Peckham Street	10/29/2024		Eligible	The St. Stanislaus R.C. Church Complex is a multiple building complex erected from 1882 to 1960 in the Broadway Fillmore neighborhood. St. Stanislaus parish was established in 1873, sparking the wave of Polish immigrant settlement in Buffalo in the late nineteenth and early twentieth century.	
154	St. Thomas Aquinas R.C. Church Complex	432 Abbott Road and 31 Tamarack Street	10/29/2024		Listed	The St. Thomas Aquinas R.C. Church Complex is a multiple building complex built in phases from 1922 to 1957 and designed in a modern interpretation of the Italian Romanesque style of architecture.	
155	St. Rose of Lima R.C. Church	500 Parker Avenue	10/29/2024		Listed	St. Rose of Lima R.C. Church was built from 1963 to 1965 and designed in a New Formalist style by Leroy H. Welch.	Only the 1963-1965 church building received designation. No other structure at 500 Parker Avenue is subject to the landmark designation.
156	All Saints R.C. Church Complex	205 Esser Avenue	2/18/2025		Eligible	The All Saints R.C. Church Complex is a multiple building complex, built in phases from 1911 to 1959 in the Riverside neighborhood.	
157	St. Michael's R.C. Church Complex	573 Washington Street	2/18/2025		Eligible	St. Michael’s R.C. Church was built from 1864 to 1867 and designed in the Romanesque Revival style by “master architect and builder” Patrick C. Keeley, and reconstructed from 1962 to 1963 under architect Roswell E. Pfohl and interior designer John D’Arcangelo.	
158	Gelston Street Workers Cottage	134 Gelston Street	3/18/2025		Eligibility undetermined	The Gelston Street Workers Cottage is a typical workers cottage built by 1887 in a Folk Victorian style with simple Queen Anne detailing.	
159	Vaux Barn	1119 Genesee Street	4/15/2025		Eligible	The Vaux Barn, built from 1875 to 1876 and designed in the Stick Style by Calvert Vaux, was part of the larger Parade House complex in The Parade (later called Humboldt Park and now Martin Luther King Jr. Park). Moved out of the park and onto 1119 Genesee Street in 1897, it is the only remaining Vaux-designed building in Buffalo.	The Vaux Barn only, and not the land or adjacent structure, has been designated a landmark.
160	Central Park Station	10 Starin Avenue	4/29/2025		Not eligible	Central Park Station is a Belt Line commuter station built in 1894 and designed in the Queen Anne style by architects M.E. Beebe & Son. The station was erected by Central Park developer Lewis J. Bennett who leased it to the New York Central Railroad, which operated the Belt Line passenger service from 1883 to shortly after the World War.	
161	DeLaine-Waring A.M.E. Church Complex	688 Swan Street	4/29/2025		Eligible	The DeLaine-Waring African Methodist Episcopal Church, originally St. Matthew’s Evangelical and Reformed Church, was built in 1868 and designed in a Romanesque Revival style by an unknown architect at the corner of Swan and Hagerman streets in the Hydraulics neighborhood. Home to the DeLaine-Waring A.M.E. Church since 1961, the church is the oldest extant religious building in the Hydraulics and remains an important living link to African American civil rights history.	
162	St. Martin's R.C. Church Complex	1087 and 1112 Abbott Road	5/27/2025		Contributing property, McKinley Parkway Historic District	The St. Martin's R.C. Church Complex is a church and school constructed between 1949 and 1959 and designed by Backus, Crane, and Love in the midcentury modern style. The Kinsey Realty Company donated the land for the parish and developed the adjacent neighborhood as "St. Martin’s Terrace."	
163	Schlitz Brewery Tied House	840 William Street	6/10/2025		Eligible	The Schlitz Brewery Tied House is a two-story commercial block building, originally consisting of a first story saloon and second story boarding rooms, located at the corner of William and Wilson streets. The building was erected in 1909 for the Schlitz Brewing Company of Milwaukee as a brewery-tied saloon serving exclusively Schlitz beer.	
164	New Skateland Arena	29 & 35 East Ferry Street	9/16/2025		Eligible	The New Skateland Arena, established in 1967 in a building constructed in 1921, attests to the importance of roller-skating culture in mid-twentieth-century Black culture and is significant in the context of the Civil Rights Movement in Buffalo.	
165	Sacred Heart R.C. Church Complex	198 Emslie Street	10/14/2025		Listed	The Sacred Heart R.C. Church Complex includes a Late Gothic Revival-style church and Craftsman-style convent, both built in 1913 and designed by architect Carl Schmill.	
166	Greater Faith Temple Church of God in Christ	480 Hickory Street	12/9/2025		Eligibility undetermined	The Greater Faith Temple Church of God in Christ, originally the Second German Baptist Church, was built in 1860 and designed in a vernacular German Romanesque style.	
167	Centennial A.M.E. Zion Church	125 Doat Street	2/17/2026		Eligibility undetermined	The Centennial A.M.E. Zion Church was built in 1911 and designed in a Gothic Revival style by Jacob Oberkircher in the Gothic Revival style with Romanesque-style elements, along with a parsonage designed with Craftsman elements.	
168	Masjid Daru-s Salaam	75 East Parade Avenue	3/31/2026		Eligibility undetermined	Masjid Daru-s Salaam is a former double-family house built by 1875 and converted to a place of worship by African American Muslims starting in 1984.	
169	Teofil Fleming House	587 Fillmore Avenue	5/12/2026		Not eligible	The Teofil Fleming House is a shop house built in 1892 and onetime home to figures who significantly contributed to the development of Broadway Fillmore.	
170	Peoples Bank of Buffalo Broadway Branch	904 & 906 Broadway	5/12/2026		Eligible	The Peoples Bank of Buffalo Broadway Branch was built from 1925-1926, with a 1931 addition. The original building was designed by Esenwein & Johnson and both in a Neoclassical/Adamesque style.	
171	Patrzykowski Building	1121 Broadway	5/26/2026		Eligibility undetermined	The Patrzykowski Building is a commercial block building constructed in 1899 for John Patrzykowski and designed by architect William G. Reiman in a Renaissance Revival style with Italianate influences.	
172	Heintz Furniture Company/Bison Products Company Complex	715 and 717 William Street	7/21/2026		Eligibility undetermined	The Heintz Furniture Company/Bison Products Company Complex is a commercial block built in 1896 and designed in a Romanesque Revival style by Frederick C.H. Mohr, with a connected 1956 building.	
173	Wolff-Sloan Building	732 William Street	7/21/2026		Eligibility undetermined	The Wolff-Sloan Building is a commercial block built in 1894 and designed by architect August Simon in a Romanesque Revival style. Originally built as Wolff's Furniture House, the building has been home to Sloan's Antiques since 1968.	
174	St. Jude's Episcopal Church	116 Macamley Street	7/21/2026		Eligible	St. Jude's Episcopal Church, now the St. Mary Eritrean Orthodox Tewahdo Church, was built in 1931 and designed in a Norman Gothic style by architects North & Shelgren.	
175	Iroquois Door Company Building	619 Exchange Street	9/15/2026		Listed	The Iroquois Door Company Building, constructed in phases from 1904 to 1925, is an early twentieth-century factory in the Hydraulics neighborhod, with its original 1904 Regular Mill Construction building designed by pioneering architect Louise Blanchard Bethune and later expansions reflecting the growth of a nationally significant manufacturer of doors and interior millwork.	
176	Benedict Apartment House	319 Fourteenth Street	9/15/2026		Not eligible	The Benedict Apartment House was built in 1889 and a rare surviving apartment building designed by pioneering architect Louise Blanchard Bethune, the first woman to practice professionally as an architect in the United States, and as an unusually intact example of her early residential work and of Buffalo’s late-nineteenth-century transition toward multi-family urban housing.	

== List of Local Historic Districts ==
A historic district is geographically definable area, which the City of Buffalo has designated per the criteria of the Preservation Ordinance, that possesses a significant concentration, linkage, or continuity of sites, buildings, structures, or objects united historically by past events or united aesthetically by plan or development. A historic district may also comprise individual elements, separated geographically, but linked by association or history.

#	Local Historic District	Adopted	Image	NRHP Status	Description	Notes
1	Delaware Historic District	3/22/1977		Listed	The Delaware Historic District is a two block section of Delaware Avenue home to the grand mansions—Renaissance, Georgian, English Gothic, and Greek Revival in style—of individuals prominently connected with the Buffalo's growth and development.	
2	Allentown Historic District	3/21/1978		Listed	The Allentown Historic District comprises the Allentown neighborhood, and represents a range of vernacular and common architectural styles, as well as architecture having national significance, from the early nineteenth to mid twentieth centuries.	Boundaries clarified 5/18/1982; 6/251985; Boundaries of NR and local historic districts do not match
3	Linwood Historic District	10/17/1978		Certified	The Linwood Historic District encompasses Linwood and Delaware avenues, and includes outstanding examples of architectural styles ranging from Gothic to Renaissance, Tudor, Italianate, and Queen Anne.	Expanded 12/23/2014, 5/6/2015; expansion in 2015 not certified
4	West Village Historic District	5/6/1980		Listed	The West Village Historic District comprises a principally residential neighborhood developed around Johnson Park in the mid to late nineteenth centuries, and encompassing styles ranging from Italianate, Second Empire, Greek Revival, to French Gothic.	Boundaries of NR and local historic districts do not match
5	Joseph Ellicott Historic District	11/20/1982		Certified	The Joseph Ellicott Historic District represents a century of growth of downtown Buffalo, with contributing structures including St. Paul's Episcopal Cathedral, Guaranty Building, Old Post Office, Ellicott Square Building, Dun Building, and City Hall.	
6	Theatre Historic District	11/15/1983		Certified	The Theatre Historic District encompasses the 600 and 700 blocks of Main Street, with contributing structures including the Market Arcade, Shea's Buffalo, Greyhound Building, and Courier Express Building.	
7	Olmsted Parks & Parkways Historic District	10/1/1985		Listed	The Olmsted Parks & Parkways Historic District encompasses the park and parkway system, America's first, designed by Frederick Law Olmsted and Calvert Vaux after 1870.	
8	Cobblestone Historic District	7/12/1994		Certified	The Cobblestone Historic District, comprising granite block streets and commercial and industrial buildings, is virtually the city's last continuing link to its Erie Canal heyday.	Amended 12/1/1998; Eligible for NRHP
9	Hamlin Park Historic District	12/15/1998		Listed	The Hamlin Park Historic District is a principally residential neighborhood developed between 1860 and 1975. The neighborhood was first German, Polish, and Jewish, and after 1950 predominantly African American.	Amended 12/9/2025 to include public right-of-way features
10	500 Block of Main Street Historic District	1/8/2008		Certified	The 500 Block of Main Street Historic District, centered at Main and Genesee streets, is historically and architecturally significant as a concentration of small-scale mixed-use buildings from the mid-nineteenth century to mid-twentieth century.	Expanded 3/20/2018
11	Genesee Gateway Historic District	7/6/2010		Certified	The Genesee Gateway Historic District is significant as a rare surviving mixed-use block with architectural styles dating between the 1840s and 1915.	Expanded 5/11/2021
12	Larkin Historic District	7/22/2014		Certified	The Larkin Historic District comprises the buildings and sites of the Larkin Company, one of the largest mail order firms in the U.S. The district comprises some of the best artifacts of Buffalo's "Golden Age" of industrial architecture from 1895 to 1925.	
13	Upper Black Rock Historic District	4/28/2015		Certified	The Upper Black Rock Historic District consists principally of industrial buildings with some remnants of the early to mid nineteenth century hamlet of Upper Black Rock.	Expanded to include 1287 Niagara Street on 3/3/2026
14	High Street Historic District	5/16/2017		Neither listed nor certified	The High Street Historic District is a three-building district comprising the Meidenbauer-Morgan House (1876), Henry Schirmer's meat market (1871), and Promiseland Baptist Church (1883).	
15	Michigan Sycamore Historic District	5/16/2017		Neither listed nor certified	The Michigan Sycamore Historic District consists of a grouping of structures dating from the mid-nineteenth to early-twentieth centuries, representing an important period in African American life in Buffalo.	68 Sycamore Street burned in 2018; 72 Sycamore Street was listed on the NRHP on 11/25/2021; Expanded 6/11/2019; Expanded 11/24/2020
16	Broadway Fillmore Historic District	5/29/2018		Certified	The Broadway Fillmore Historic District was developed from the late nineteenth to mid-twentieth centuries, comprises several architectural styles and notable buildings, and is strongly associated with Buffalo's Polish immigrant history.	
17	Berrick & Sons Demonstration Homes Historic District	3/16/2021		Listed	The Berrick & Sons Demonstration Homes Historic District is a collection of seven related buildings (84, 88, 90, 94, 96, 100, & 102 Florida Street) designed by the prominent late-19th century architect George J. Metzger and built in about 1901.	
18	Lower Black Rock Historic District	6/13/2023		Certified	The Lower Black Rock Historic District, with 12 contributing buildings and a period of significance of 1830 to 1957, embodies a typical mixed use "main street" built alongside the Erie Canal and New York State Barge Canal.	

== See also ==
- National Register of Historic Places listings in Buffalo, New York
