= Walter V. Davidson House =

Historic house in New York, United States

- Location within New York
- Interactive map showing the Walter V. Davidson’s house location

General information
- Type: Wood & Stucco
- Architectural style: Prairie School
- Location: 57 Tillinghast Place, Buffalo, NY
- Coordinates: 42.942028°N 78.853886°W
- Construction started: 1908
- Governing body: Private

Design and construction
- Architect: Frank Lloyd Wright

The Walter V. Davidson House, located at 57 Tillinghast Place in Buffalo, New York, United States, was designed by Frank Lloyd Wright and built in 1908. It is an example of Wright's Prairie School architectural style. The house is a contributing property to the Parkside East Historic District, a neighborhood laid out by renowned American landscape architect Frederick Law Olmsted in 1876, and also a City of Buffalo landmark.

== Client ==
Wright's patron, Walter V. Davidson, had joined the Larkin Company in Buffalo as the advertising manager in 1906. Davidson was introduced to Wright by fellow Larkin executive Darwin D. Martin. Wright had arrived in Buffalo in 1903 to build the existing house for Martin, and Martin was instrumental in selecting Wright as the architect for the Larkin Administration Building, in downtown Buffalo, Wright's first major commercial project. Consequently, Wright was commissioned to build a house by Davidson, and in turn another Larkin employee William R. Heath. Davidson left both the house and the Larkin Company in 1913 to establish the Davidson Shoe Company.

== Design ==
In a house built on a relatively modest budget, Wright emphasized space and light rather than ornament. This helped make the Davidson House notable in several respects, primarily as a "Tall Living Room" house. The living room is two stories high featuring a 2-story bay window on the east wall and 1 1/2-story-high clerestory windows on the north and south walls. Due to the large area of glass, and the restricted budget, the house is also notable in that the windows do not incorporate the use of art glass, as in many other Wright houses of the period: instead the windows consist of leaded diamond-shaped panes. These panes are oriented horizontally, rather than vertically, uncommon to the style of the day but in keeping with Wright's emphasis on the horizontal. Each pane is offset a number of degrees, rather than laid flat on an even plane, increasing privacy due to light reflecting off the glass at different angles.

The basic floor plan is cruciform. On the ground floor is the dining room, and at the opposite end a porch, with the "Tall Living Room" and the second story centered in the middle. The floor plan is almost identical to the Isabel Roberts House, built that same year in River Forest, Illinois, but mirror-imaged and rotated ninety degrees from the street. This resulted in the living room being oriented to the side of the house rather than the street front, which initially afforded a nice view of the woods in 1908. This view was quickly lost, however, when the house next door was built. Like the William R. Heath House the Davidson House has a half-level basement containing the utilities, a laundry, pantry, and maid's quarters. Nearby are the kitchen and side entry on the ground floor. There are three bedrooms and bathroom on the second floor.

The exterior and interior of the house incorporate typical Prairie School elements found in most of Wright's designs of the era: broad overhanging cantilevered eaves, low hip roofs, bands of casement windows, Roman brick in the fireplace and hearth, vertical wooden slats creating a screen to hide the stairway, built-in exterior planters, and an overall emphasis on horizontal lines throughout.

=== Renovation ===
In the 1930s the residence was remodeled, updating the kitchen and creating a master suite built over the garage. One of the original bedrooms was reduced in size and a closet eliminated to make way for a hallway leading to the new suite, which consisted of a dressing chamber, bathroom, and sleeping chamber. The addition incorporated the same casement windows of diamond-shaped leaded glass prevalent in the rest of the house.

== Photo gallery ==
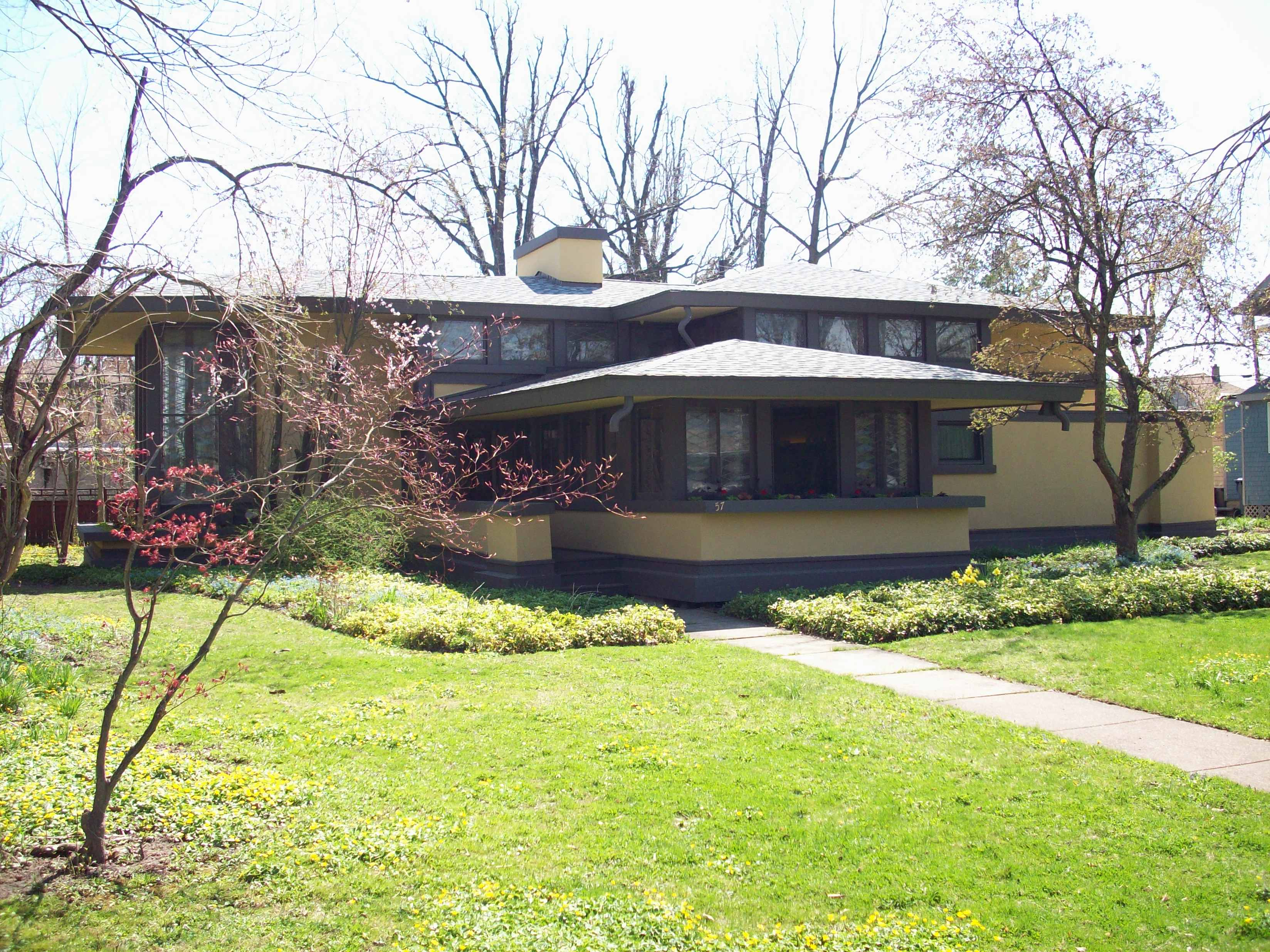
Walter V. Davidson House

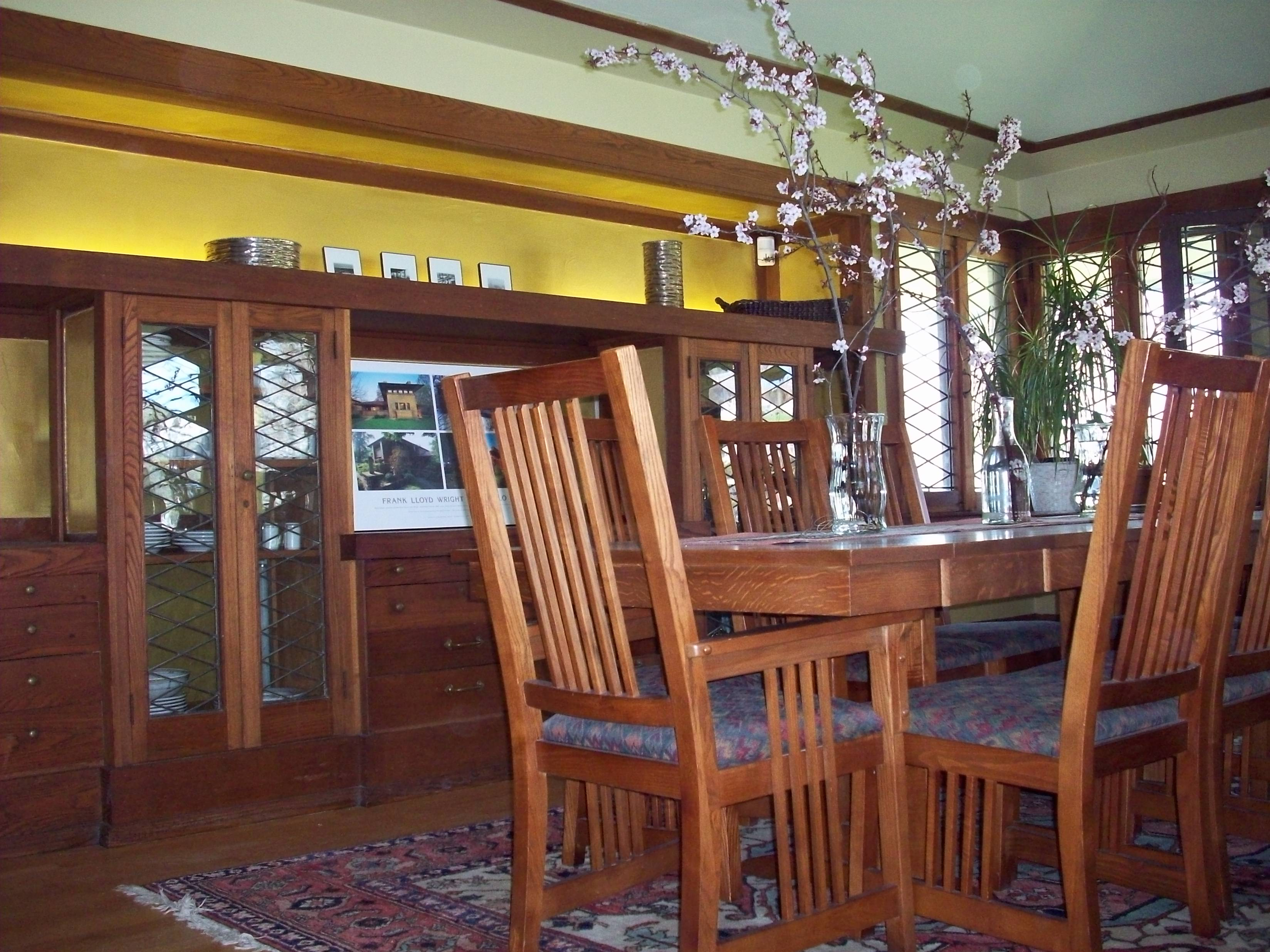
Dining Room with Built-In Side Board

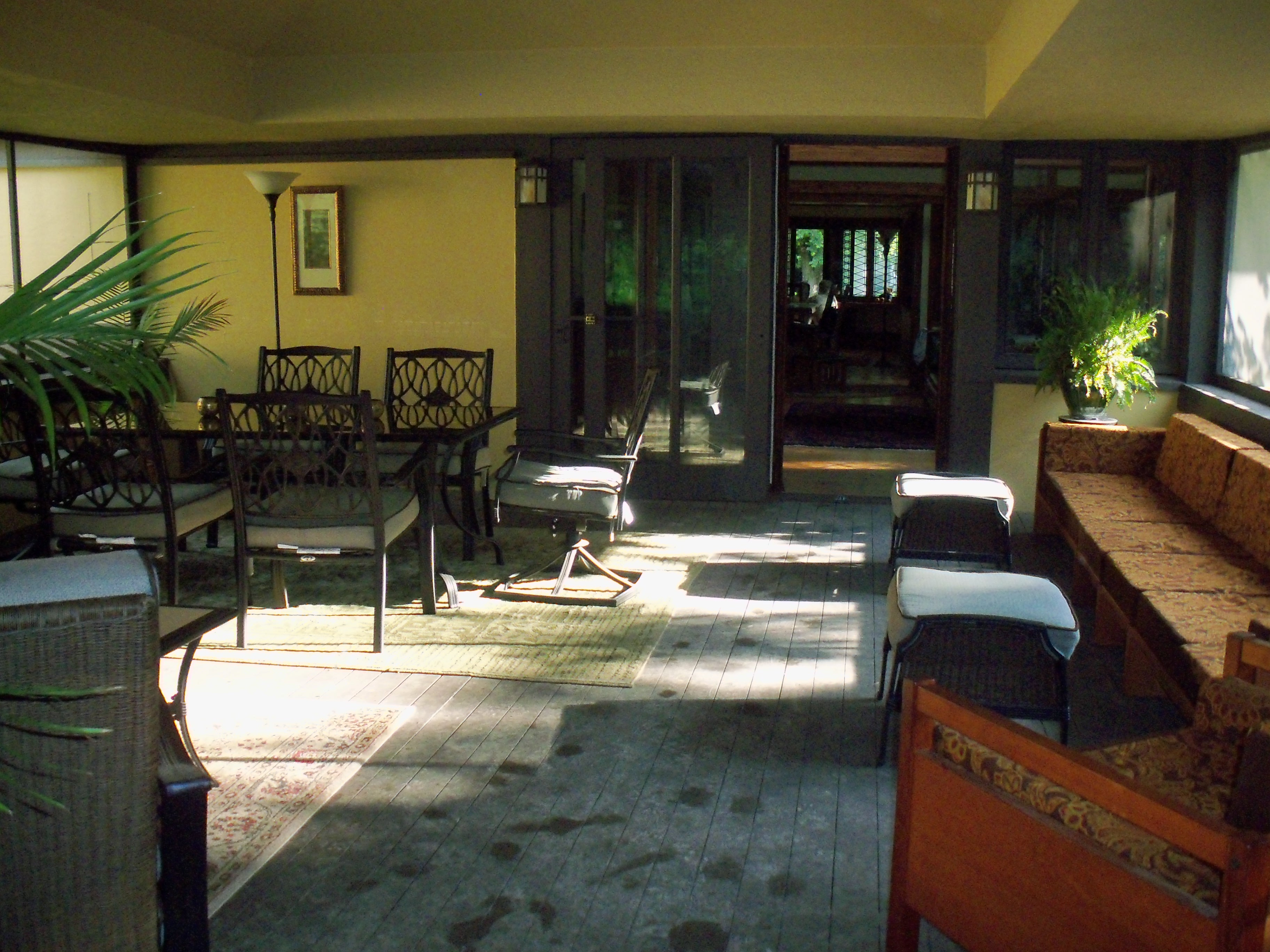
View of Sun Porch looking towards living room

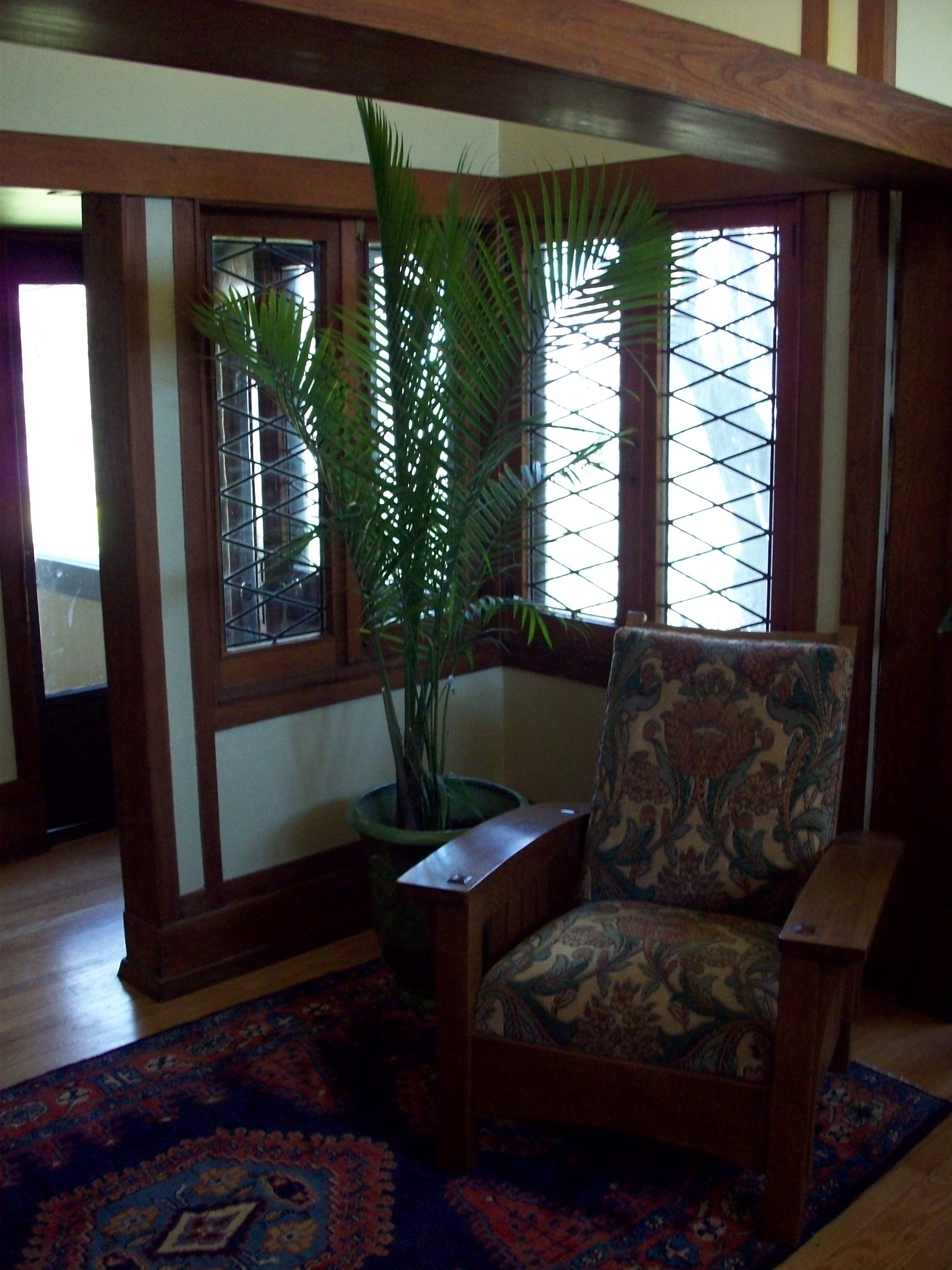
Interior view of front entrance

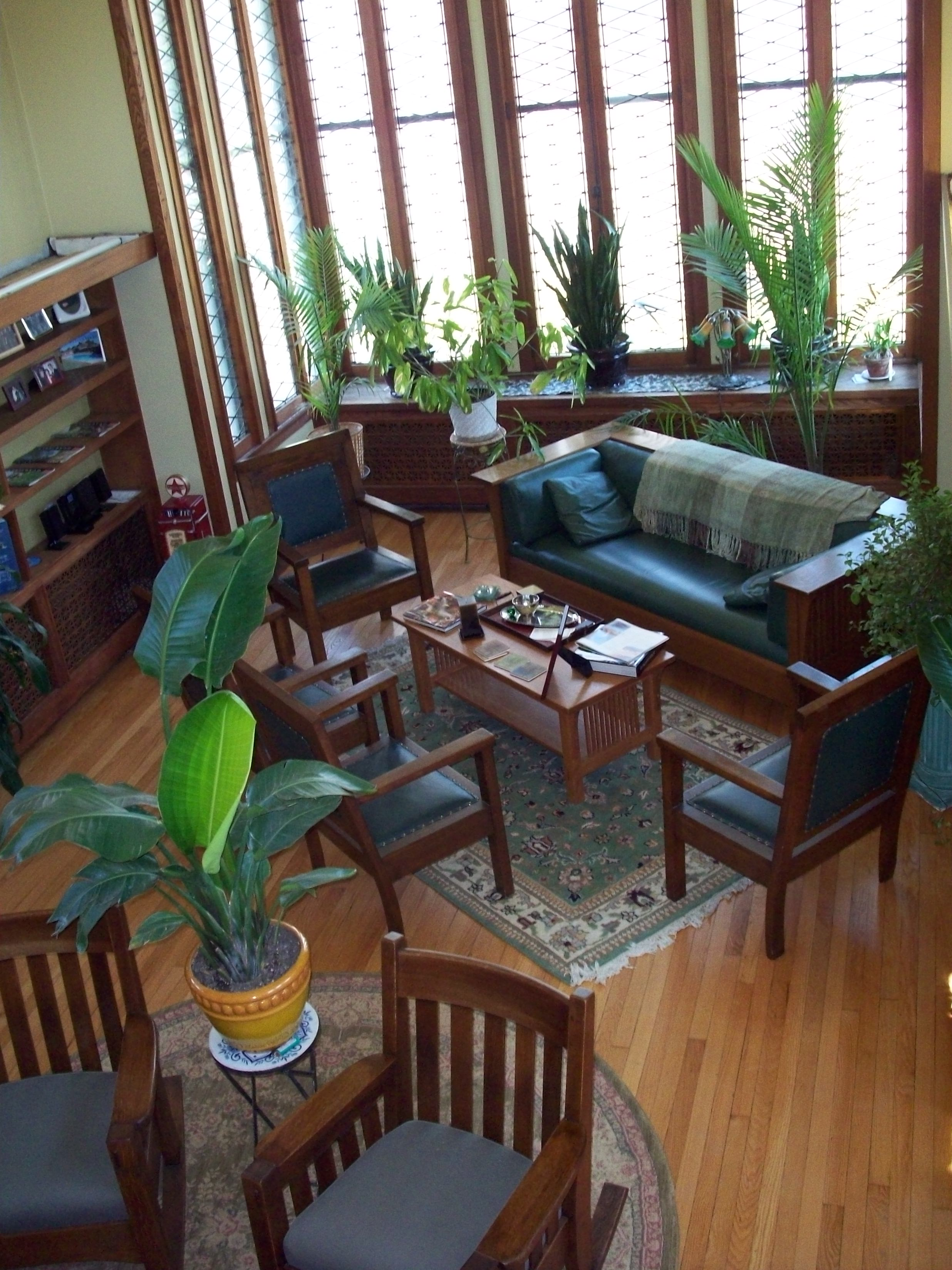
Living room with two-story bay window

== See also ==
- List of Frank Lloyd Wright works
