= Fargo Estate Historic District =

Historic district in New York, United States

- U.S. National Register of Historic Places
- U.S. Historic district
- New York State Register of Historic Places
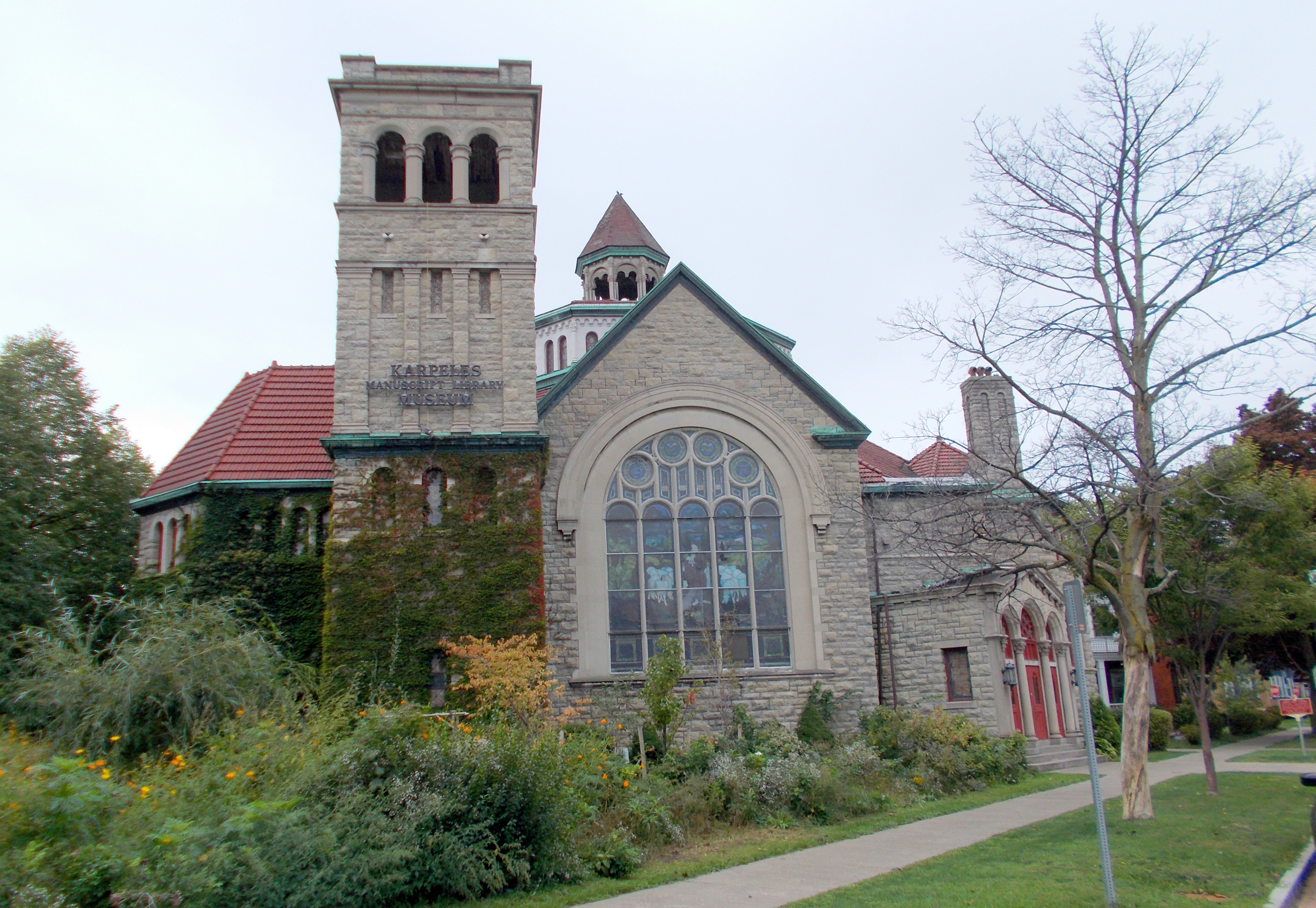
- Karpeles Library and Manuscript Museum, September 2016

- Location within New York Location within the United States
- Location: Portions of Fargo, Normal, Plymouth, Porter, Prospect & West Aves., Jersey & Pennsylvania Sts., Cobb Alley, Buffalo, New York
- Coordinates: 42°54′03″N 78°53′26″W
- Area: 49.08 acres (19.86 ha)
- Built: c. 1912, 1932; 1933; 1948; 1964-1965
- Built by: Howell, Harvey; Hudson, Mathew J.
- Architects: Harris, Thomas W.; Eckel, Louis P.J.; Swan, C.D.; Holmes & Little; Swan & Falkner; Metzger, George J.; M.E. Beebe & Son; Percival, Charles; Porter, Cyrus K., and Son
- Architectural style: Italianate, Queen Anne, Colonial Revival, Bungalow/craftsman
- NRHP reference No.: 15001024

Significant dates
- Added to NRHP: February 2, 2016
- Designated NYSRHP: December 7, 2015

Fargo Estate Historic District is a national historic district located at Buffalo, Erie County, New York. The district encompasses 390 contributing buildings, 1 contributing site, and 2 contributing objects on the Lower West Side of Buffalo. This predominantly residential district developed between about 1850 and 1930, and includes notable examples of Italianate, Queen Anne, Colonial Revival, and American Craftsman style architecture. A 2 1/2-block section of the neighborhood was developed between about 1888 and 1910 on the former "Fargo Estate," the home of William Fargo. Located in the district are the separately listed Engine House No. 2 and Hook and Ladder No. 9 and a section of the Delaware Park-Front Park System (Porter Avenue). Other notable buildings include the Benedict House (c. 1890), Plymouth Methodist Episcopal Church / now Karpeles Library and Manuscript Museum (1912), and West Side Presbyterian Church / now Iglesia de Cristo Misionera (1882).

It was listed on the National Register of Historic Places in 2016.
