= Durham Memorial A.M.E. Zion Church =

Historic church in New York, United States

- U.S. National Register of Historic Places
- New York State Register of Historic Places
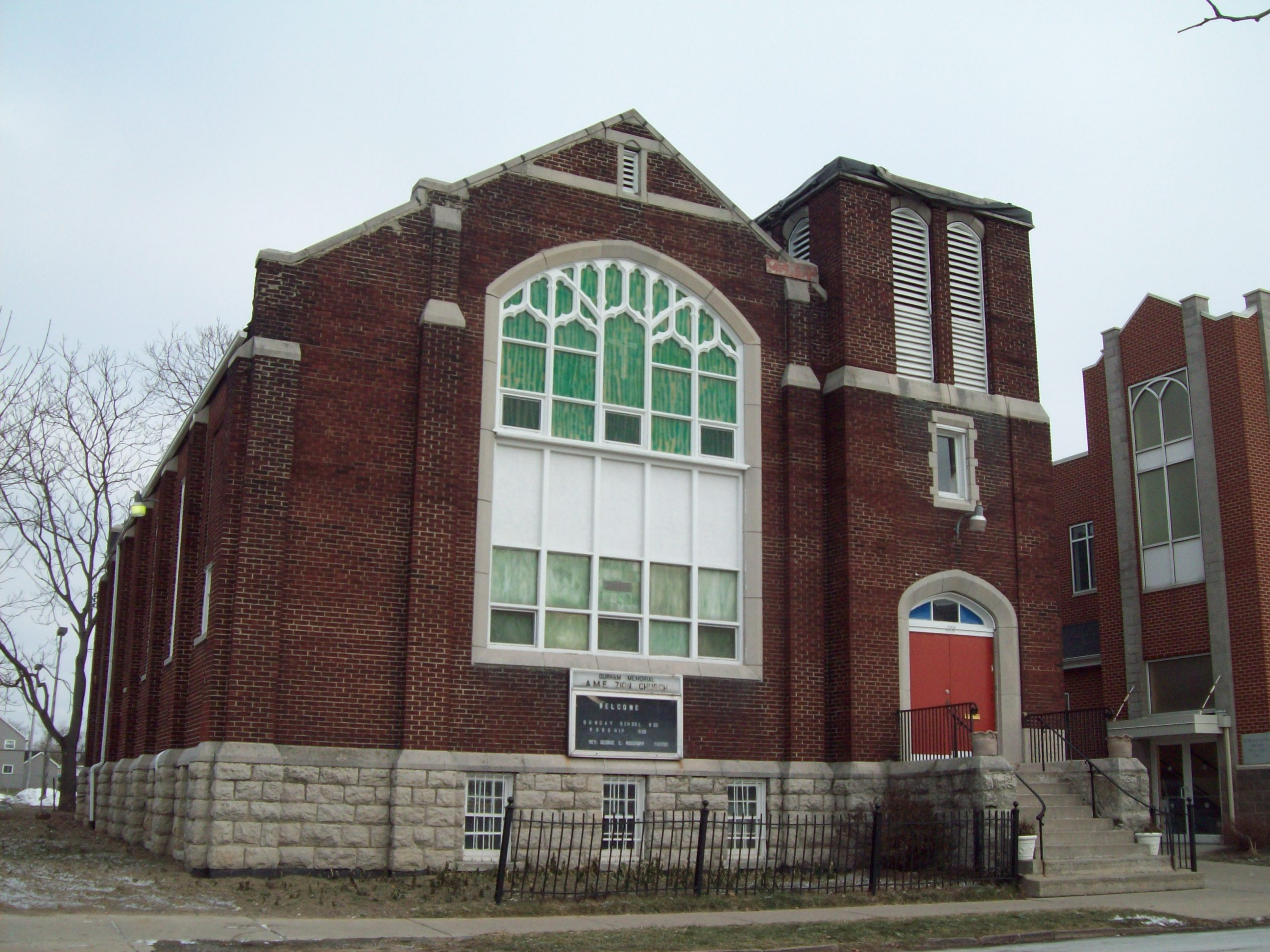
- Durham Memorial A.M.E. Zion Church, December 2009

- Location within New York Location within the United States
- Location: 174 E. Eagle St., Buffalo, New York
- Coordinates: 42°53′0″N 78°52′7″W
- Area: 0.7 acres (0.28 ha)
- Built: 1920
- Architects: Greenstein, Louis
- NRHP reference No.: 83001670
- NYSRHP No.: 02940.006042

Significant dates
- Added to NRHP: September 15, 1983
- Designated NYSRHP: August 17, 1983

Durham Memorial A.M.E. Zion Church, formerly known as St. Luke's A.M.E. Zion Church until the late 1950s, is a historic African Methodist Episcopal Zion Church located at Buffalo in Erie County, New York. It is a brick church constructed in 1920. It is the oldest surviving church associated with the Buffalo A.M.E. Zion congregations.

It was listed on the National Register of Historic Places in 1983.
