= Laurel and Michigan Avenues Row =

- U.S. National Register of Historic Places
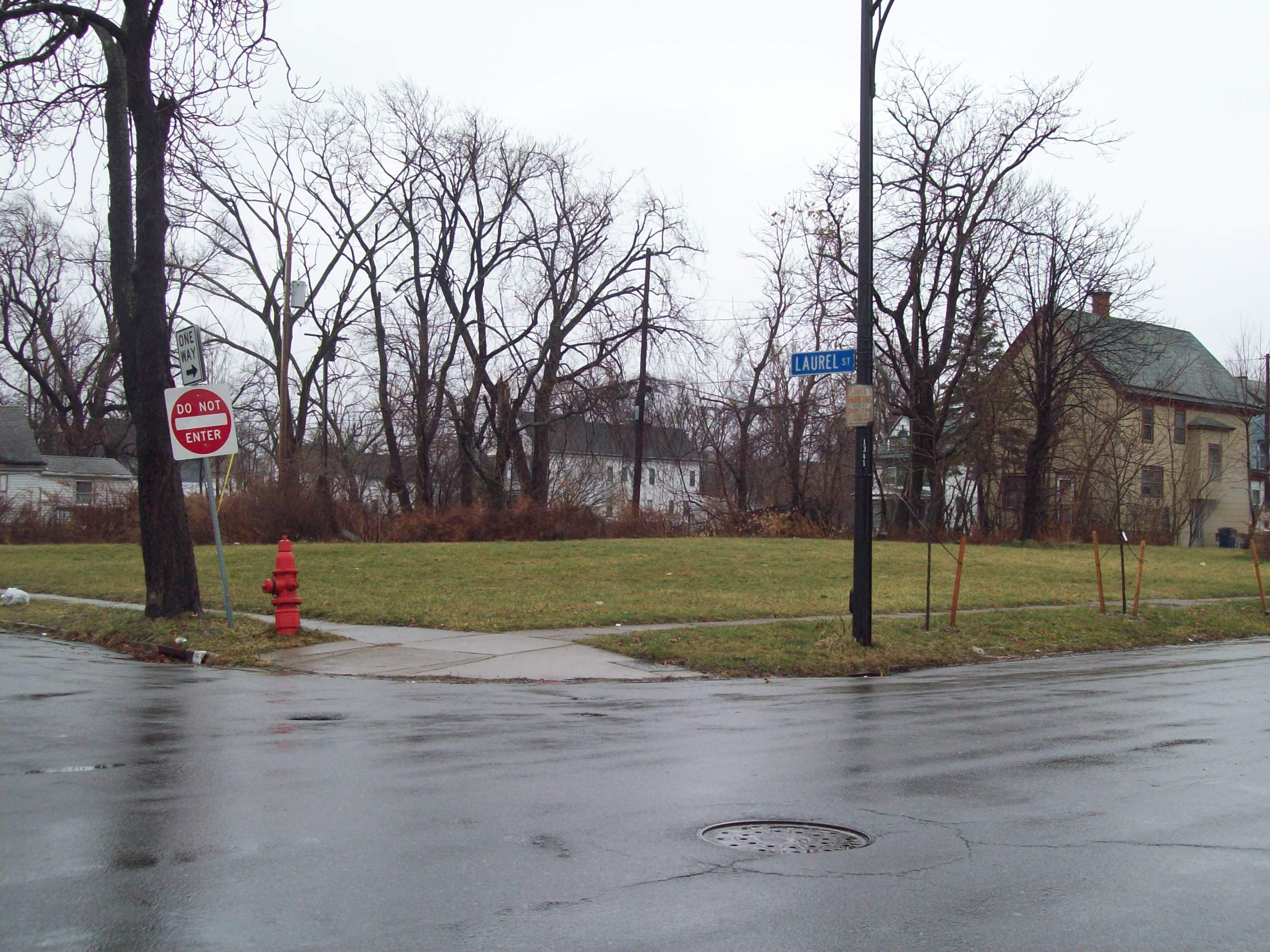
- Former Laurel and Michigan Avenues Row Site, December 2009

- Location within New York Location within the United States
- Location: 1335-1345 Michigan Ave., Buffalo, New York
- Coordinates: 42°54′36″N 78°51′45″W
- Area: 0.5 acres (0.20 ha)
- Built: 1880
- Architectural style: Italianate
- MPS: Masten Neighborhood Rows TR
- NRHP reference No.: 86000688
- Added to NRHP: March 19, 1986

Laurel and Michigan Avenues Row was a set of historic rowhouses located in Buffalo, Erie County, New York. It was a set of speculative multi-unit frame residences designed to resemble rowhouses. The set of nine frame, two-story rowhouses was built about 1880. They were demolished in 1997.

It was listed on the National Register of Historic Places in 1986.
