= St. Andrew's Evangelical Lutheran Church Complex =

Historic church in New York, United States

- U.S. National Register of Historic Places
- New York State Register of Historic Places
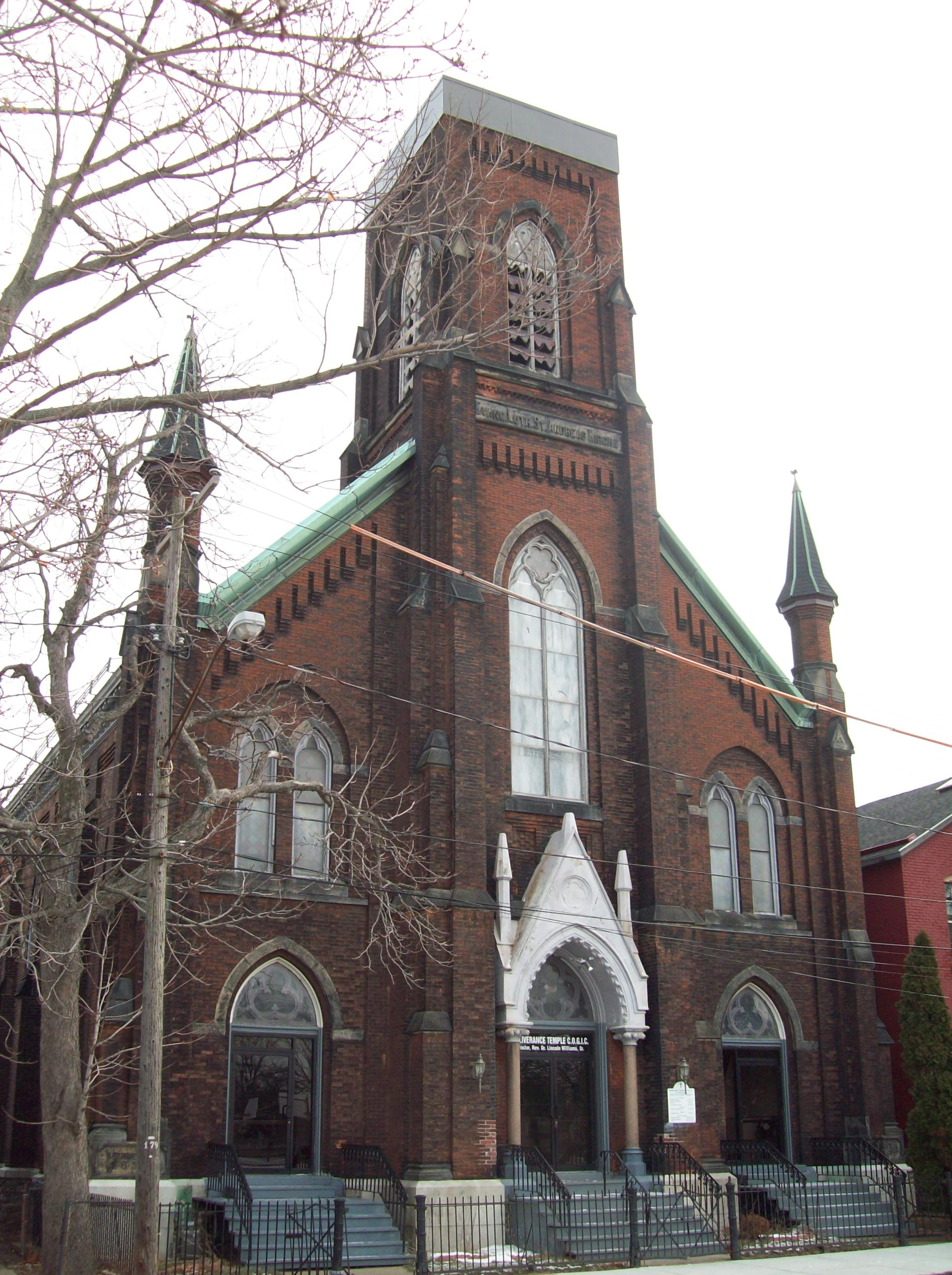
- St. Andrew's Evangelical Lutheran Church, December 2009

- Location within New York Location within the United States
- Location: Sherman and Peckham Sts., Buffalo, New York
- Coordinates: 42°53′17″N 78°50′48″W
- Area: less than one acre
- Built: 1859
- Architects: Schaefer, Henrich; Saenger, Louis
- Architectural style: Gothic, Queen Anne, Romanesque
- NRHP reference No.: 83001674
- NYSRHP No.: 02940.006039, 02940.006041

Significant dates
- Added to NRHP: September 08, 1983
- Designated NYSRHP: August 10, 1983

St. Andrew's Evangelical Lutheran Church Complex, also known as Deliverance Temple of God & Christ, is a historic Evangelical Lutheran church complex located at Buffalo in Erie County, New York. The complex consists of the original German Lutheran church structure constructed in 1859 and later remodeled into a school; the eclectic Gothic-Romanesque style church structure constructed in 1885; and the Queen Anne style parish house constructed in 1892.

It was listed on the National Register of Historic Places in 1983.
