= Blessed Trinity Roman Catholic Church Buildings =

Historic church in New York, United States

- U.S. National Register of Historic Places
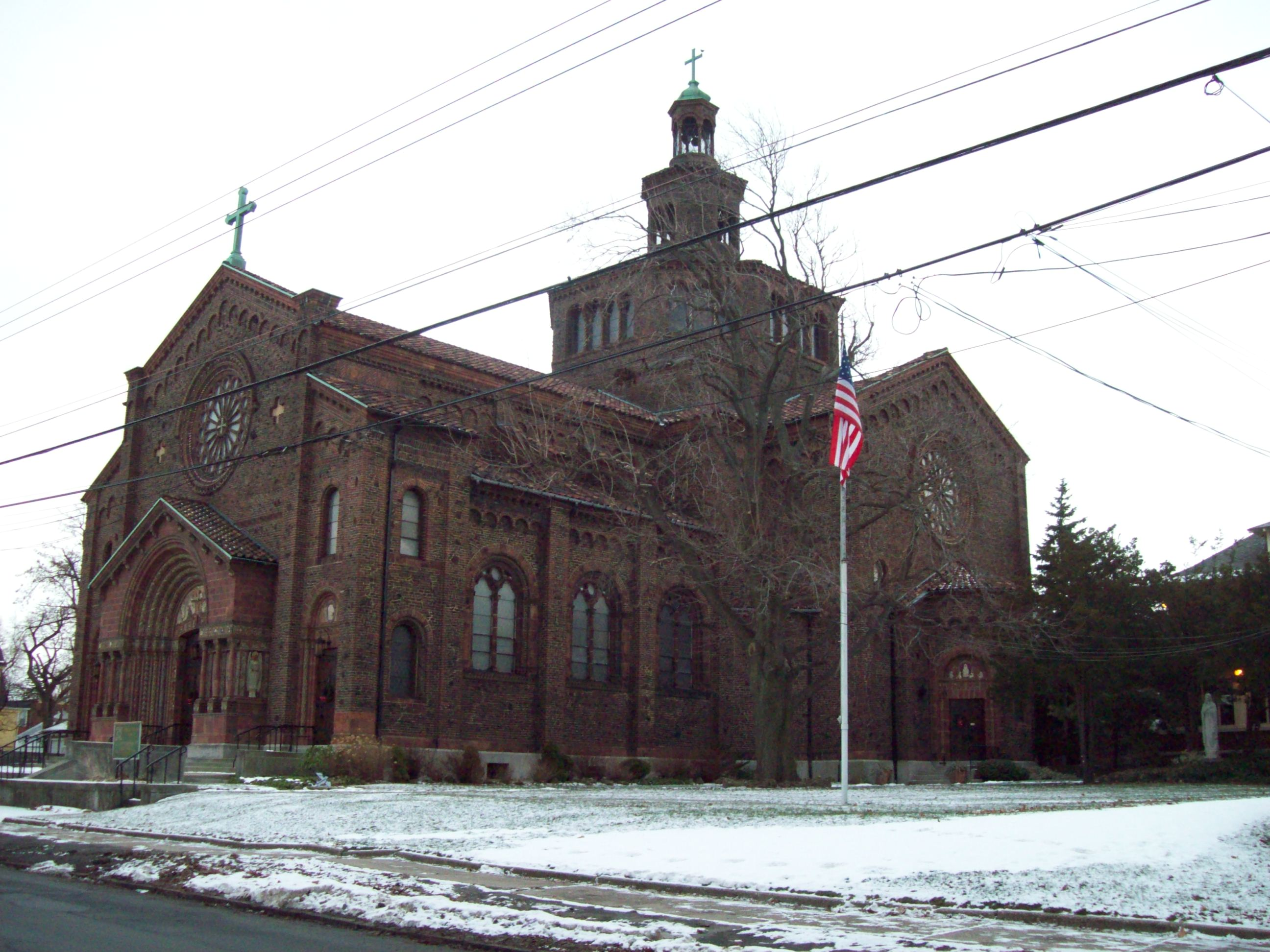
- Blessed Trinity Roman Catholic Church, Buffalo, NY, December 2009

- Location within New York Location within the United States
- Location: 317 LeRoy Ave, Buffalo, New York
- Coordinates: 42°55′57″N 78°50′3″W
- Area: 1.3 acres (0.53 ha)
- Built: 1907
- Architect: Schmill & Gould
- Architectural style: Lombard-Romanesque
- NRHP reference No.: 79001579
- Added to NRHP: August 3, 1979

Blessed Trinity Roman Catholic Church Buildings is a historic Romanesque Revival Roman Catholic church complex located at Buffalo in Erie County, New York. It is part of the Diocese of Buffalo.

== Description ==
The complex consists of the church, church-school building (constructed 1907), and parish house (constructed 1914). The church was constructed in 1923 and is considered the purest replication of 12th century Lombard-Romanesque architecture in the United States. The church is constructed of unmolded medieval style brick and may well contain the largest collection of colored architectural terracotta decoration in an ecclesiastical structure in this country.

It was listed on the National Register of Historic Places in 1979.

== Gallery ==
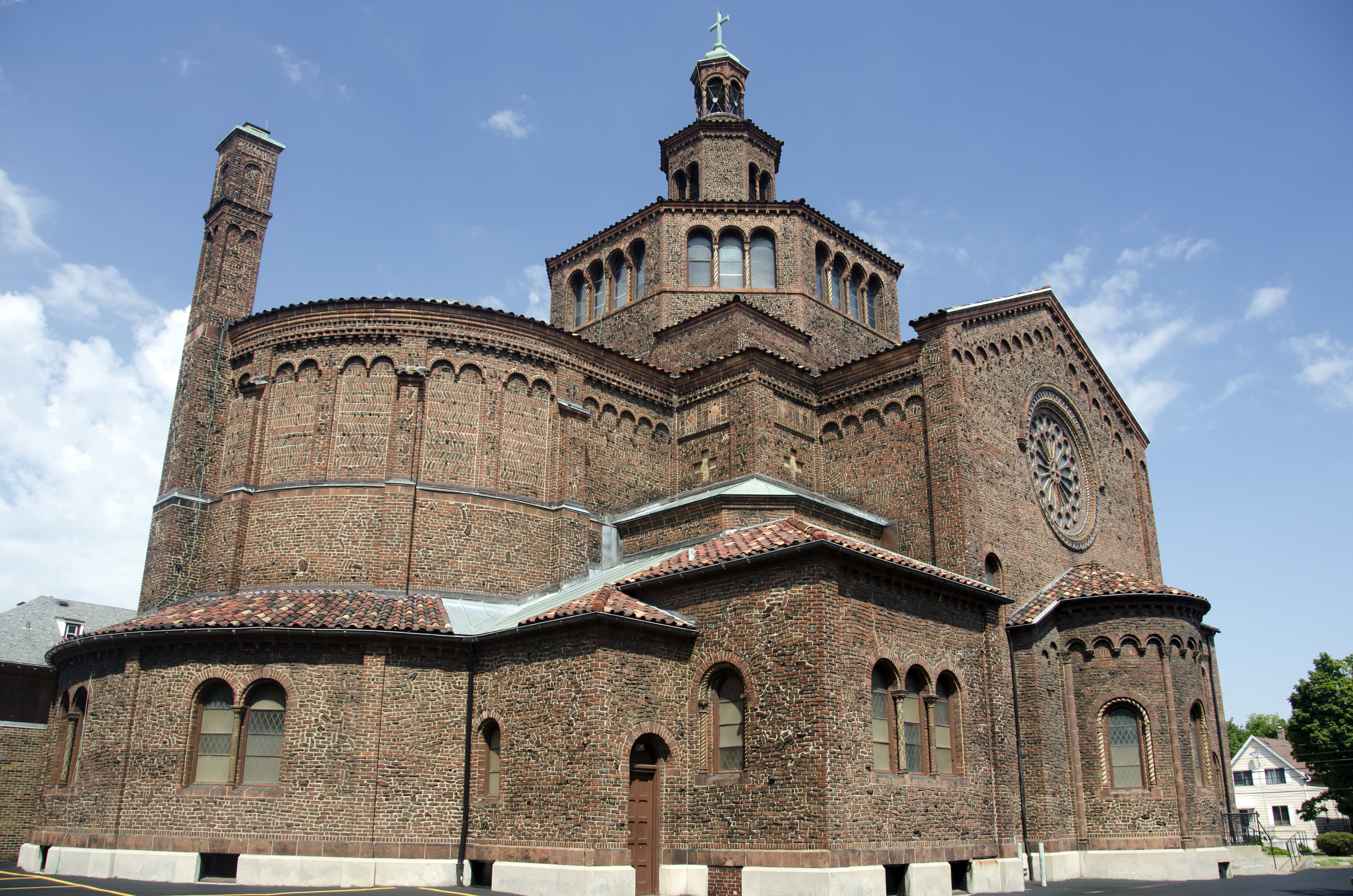
Blessed Trinity RC Church, August 2012

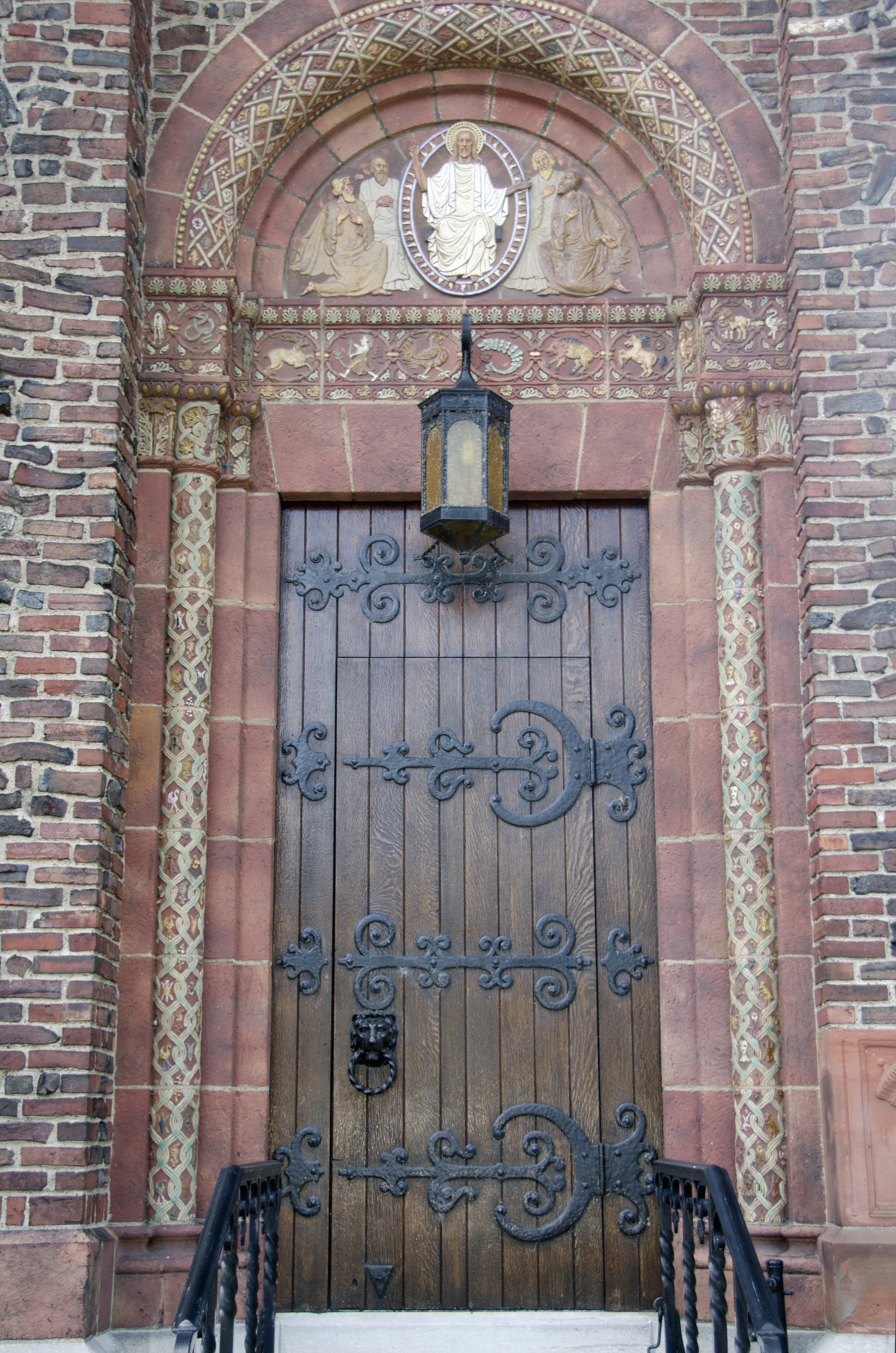
Right portal of the main entrance, Blessed Trinity RC Church, August 2012

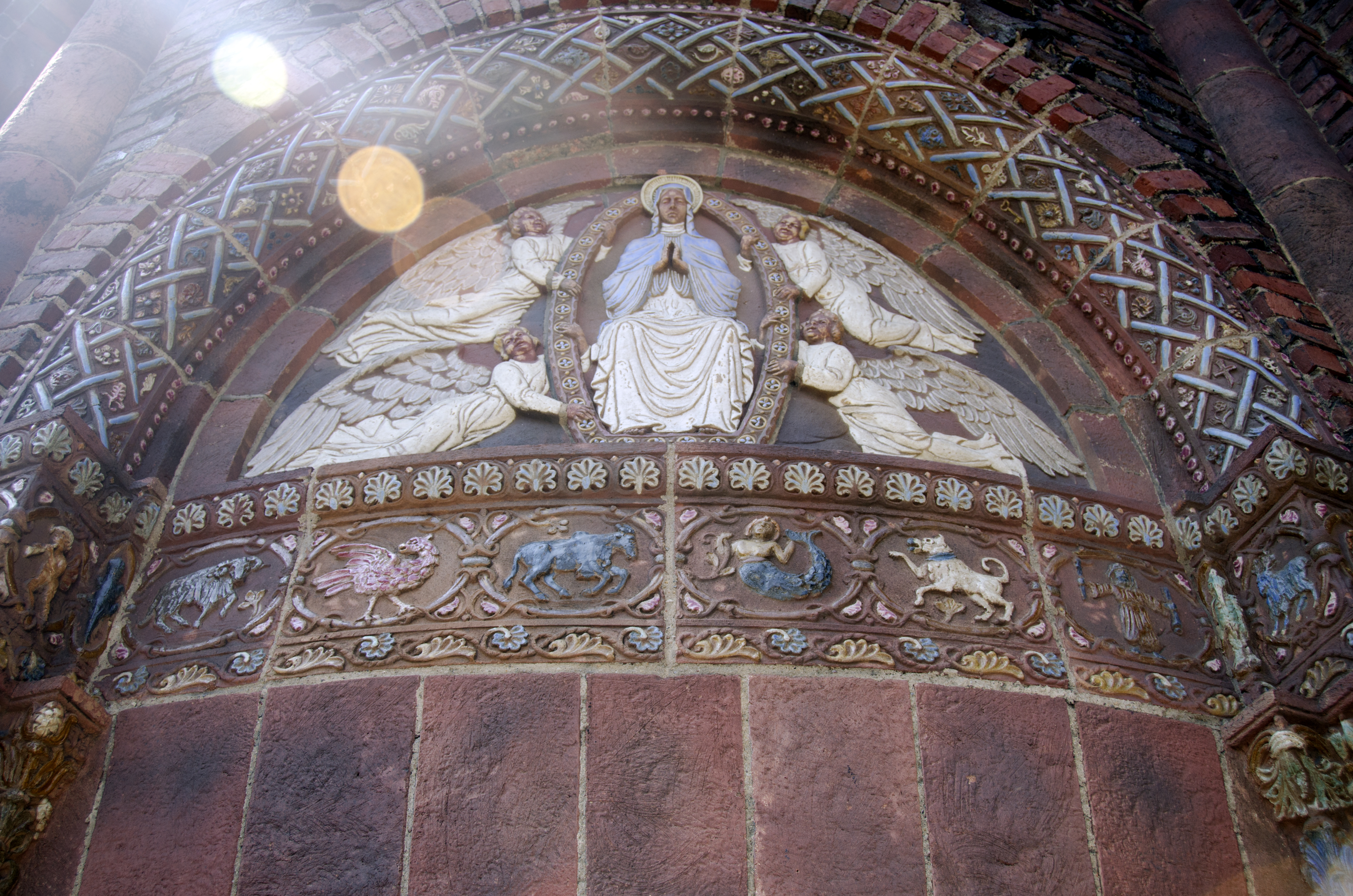
Side entrance, Blessed Trinity RC Church, August 2012

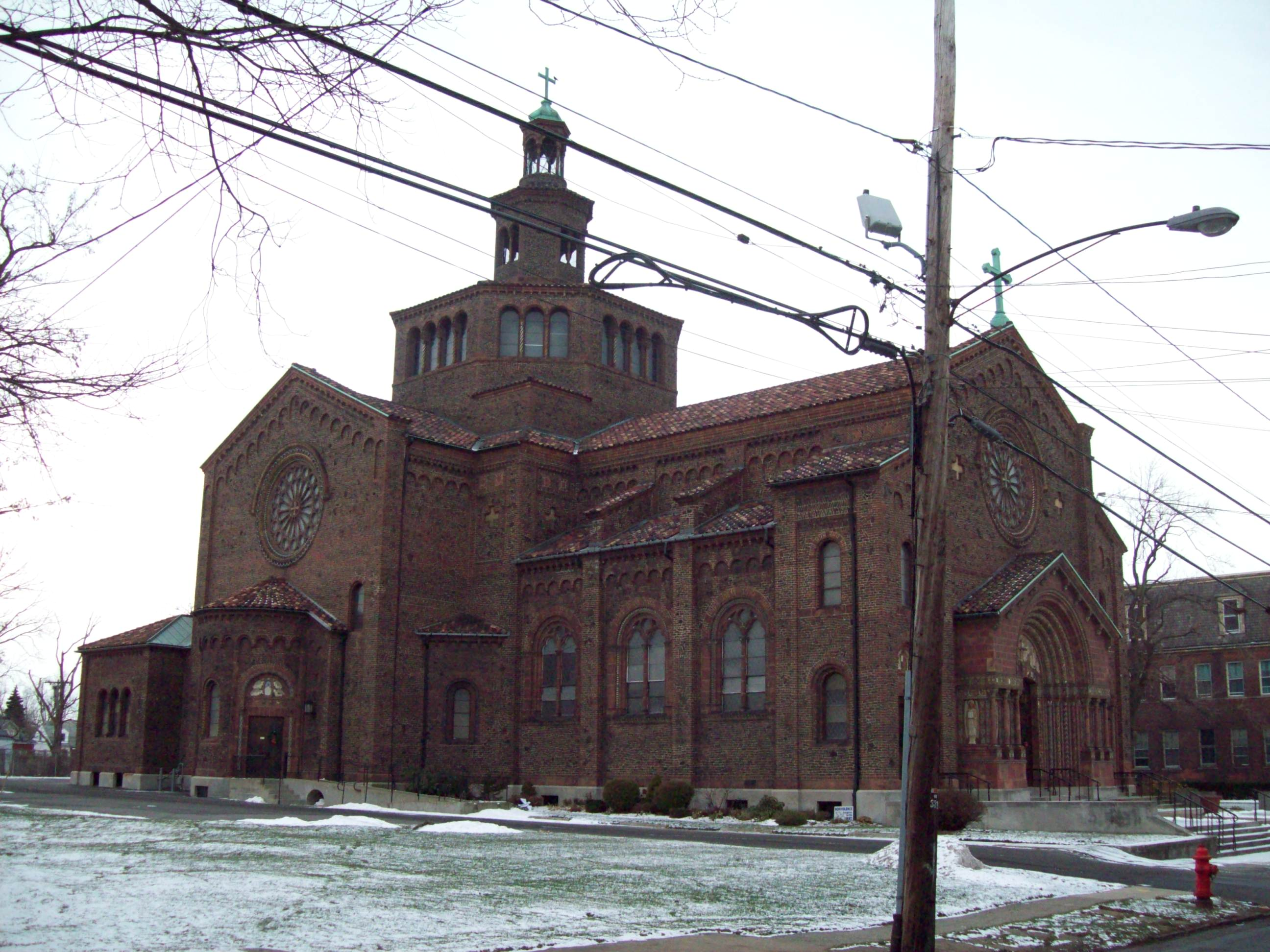
Blessed Trinity Roman Catholic Church-East Side View, December 2009

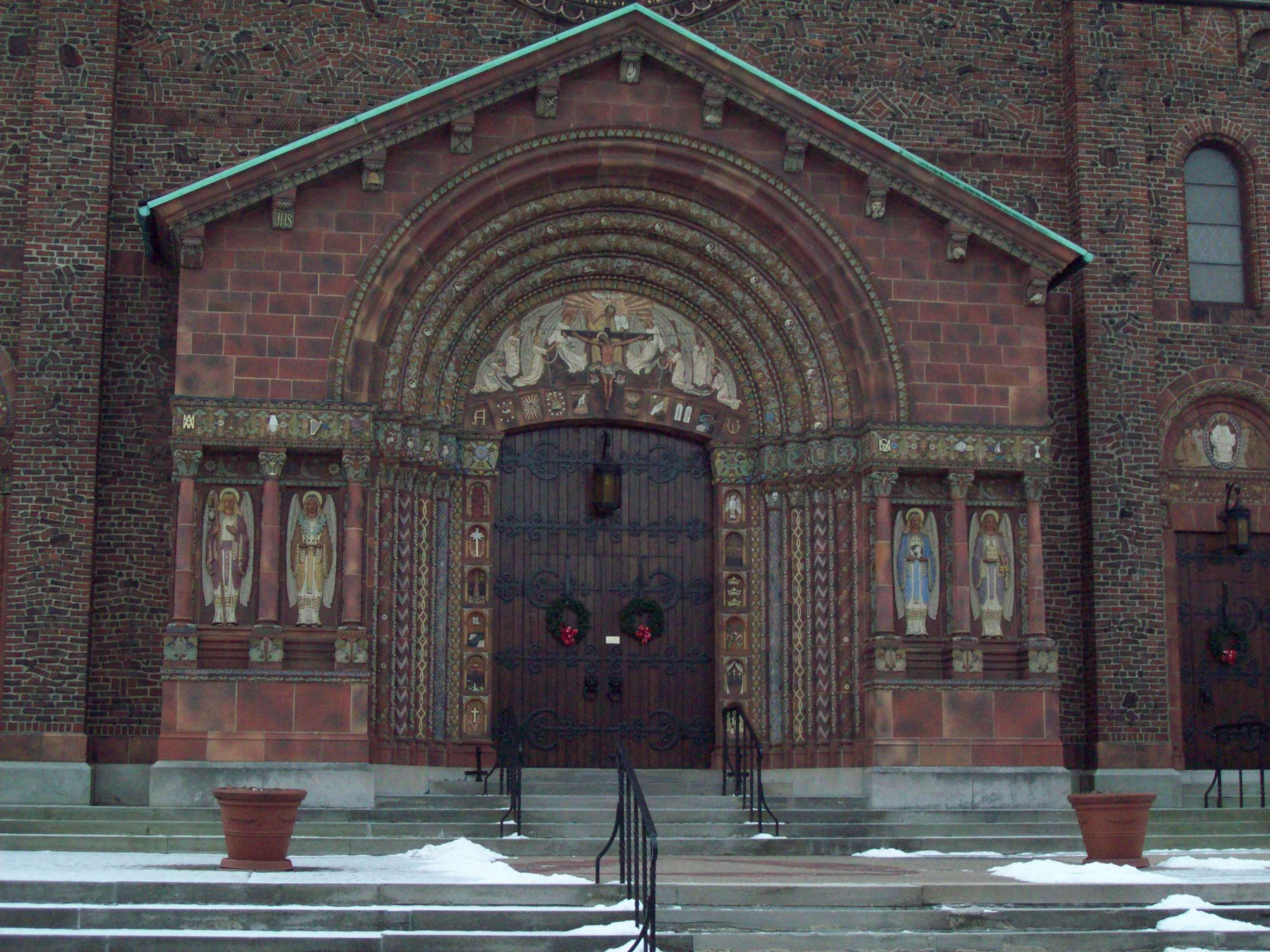
Blessed Trinity Roman Catholic Church-Entrance Detail, December 2009

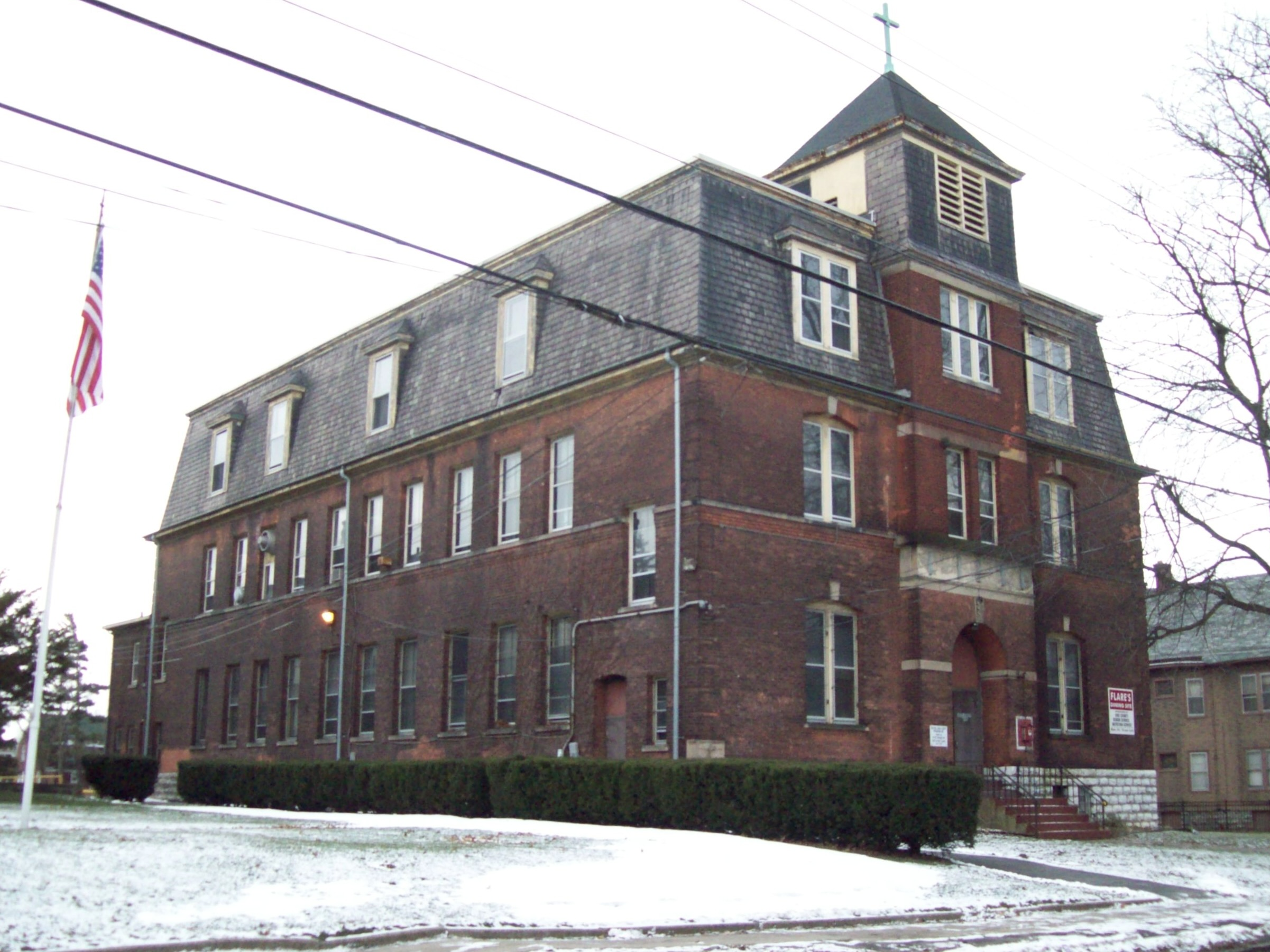
Blessed Trinity Roman Catholic Church-Church-School Building, December 2009
