= Schenck House (Buffalo) =

House in Buffalo, New York

Coordinates: 42°57′30″N 78°48′42″W

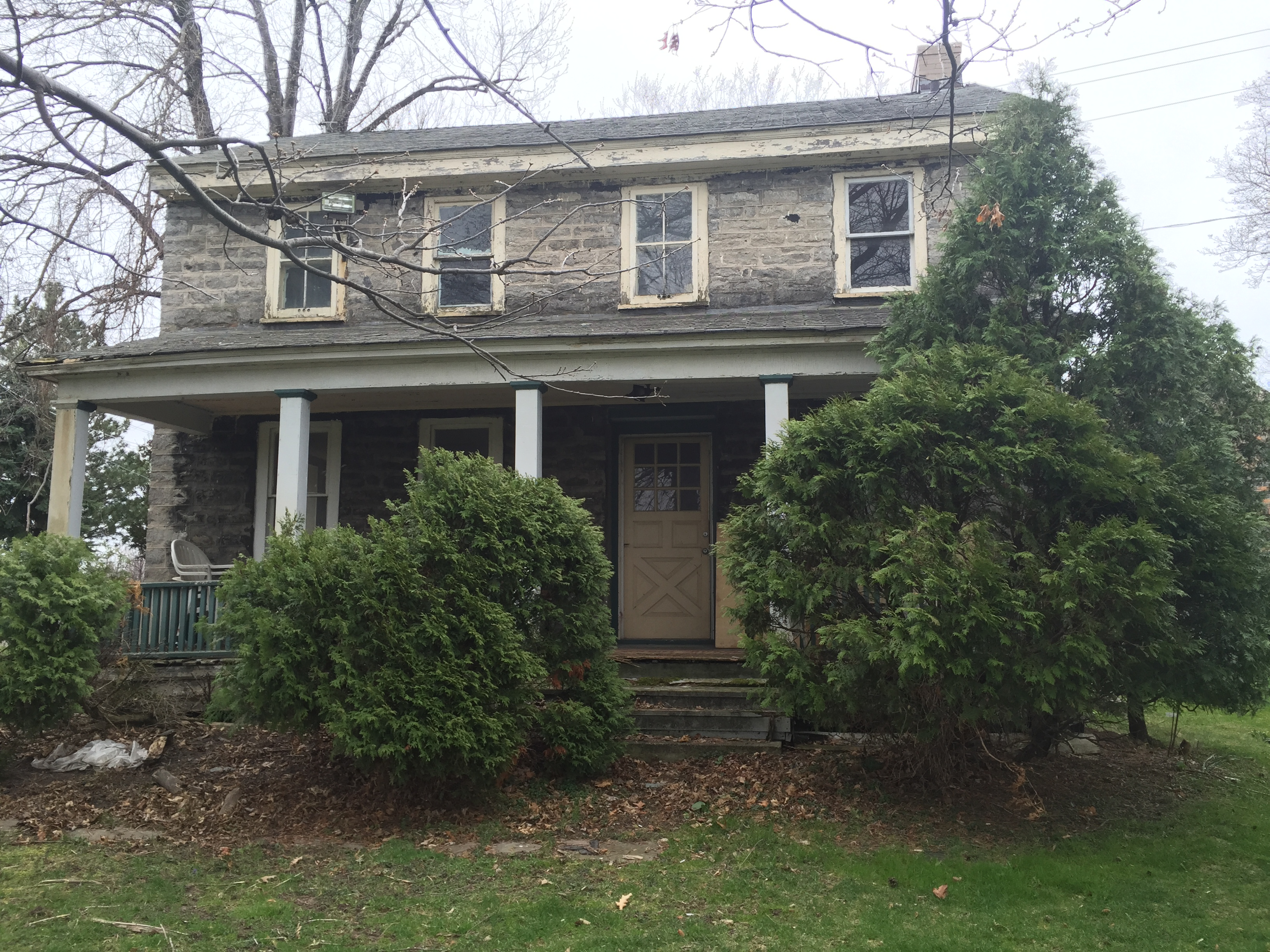
The house in 2016

The Schenck House (built 1822) is one of the earliest extant homes currently within the city limits of Buffalo, New York. It was built by early pioneer and farmer Michael Schenck and his son Samuel Schenck out of limestone.

== History ==
The property was originally part of the Hamlet of Snyder, in the Town of Amherst and continued to be when the family sold it to the Country Club of Buffalo in 1898. The Country Club kept the original buildings except for a cottage – northwest of the main stone house – where Samuel Schenck’s mother Catherine Schenck lived. They added a tennis court, polo field, large club house, garages and a 16-hole golf course. The golf course was completed in 1902. The property was rezoned in the 1920s when it was sold to the City of Buffalo. It became a public park and golf course called Grover Cleveland Golf Course. It was transferred again in the 1970s, this time to Erie County; however, the property remained within the city limits. Around 1970, the large barn and significantly smaller structure were demolished. The Schenck house currently has three of the original six buildings and roughly 180 acres of the original acres surviving to 2016. The 2003 Master Plan developed by Erie County has stated that it is looking at filing for preservation status. The three remaining buildings, in addition to census, church and other records, show that the architecture, farming techniques and religious preferences of the Schencks were of a distinctly Pennsylvania German-Swiss (also called Pennsylvanian Dutch) heritage and culture. They were part of a wave of immigrants that arrived in the Niagara County (later divided into Niagara & Erie County) during the pre-civil war era. Many of the immigrants from Pennsylvania did not live in isolated communities and instead built homes and lived among people from a variety of places of origin. The Friends of Schenck House work with and support Erie County and the 2003 Master Plan to restore the second oldest building in the City of Buffalo.

== Architecture ==
The house has had some alteration over its history, most of which was in the 19th century and included a front porch and two-story rear addition. The construction of the Schenck House was likely started in June 1822, when Michael Schenck purchased the property for $1000, and completed in August 1823, when Michael sold it to his eldest son Samuel Schenck for $3500. The Schenck House was built with a “Continental Pennsylvania German House” (CPGH) floor plan of three rooms over three rooms, without a Federal style “central entrance hall”, plus additional windows set into the third floor for functional light. Traditionally, this style would include a central chimney on a stone or brick central support wall. Further investigation is needed to determine if the two interior chimneys at either end of the house were original to the house. The Continental Pennsylvania German House plan was brought over to America with immigrants in the 17th and 18th century and dates to the Middle Ages in Central Europe. A comparable extant house is the 2 1/2-story Immel House in the State of Pennsylvania; three interior rooms over three, three exterior bays by two deep, with a central chimney and additional windows set into the gable end of the half story.

The exterior of the Schenck house is in the “Pennsylvania German Traditional” (PGT) style pre-1830s due to the asymmetry of the front door. It is noted that the “four over four” [four exterior bays over four] was first used with an asymmetrical front entrance as is the Schenck House, and then by the 1830s either PGT symmetrical (two matching doors) front entrance or English Federal style single door central bay front entrance. The Green House is an example of Vernacular style.

Cooking in an 1823 house would have involved using the fireplace and in the case of the Schencks a 10 plate stove and pipe. A "5 plate stove" or German Jamb stove was a cast-iron free-standing stove developed in German speaking regions in the 1550s A.D.. However, it was used for heating the sleeping and sitting areas of the first floor of the house. The kitchen was heated by the kitchen fireplace. Once in America German immigrants developed a 6 plate or closed stove which was cooked on by the 1740s. Benjamin Franklin is also an inventor of a coal burning stove in 1741, Franklin stove. However, it was not free-standing and was inserted into the fireplace.

Items found in Michael Schenck's 1844 inventory that relate to food preparation included the following: One ten plate stove & Pipe, 1 kitchen cupboard & crockery, 1 table, settee (possibly Pennsylvanian German style), elbow chair, Ironware and hooks. The inventory is short and lacks all personal items.

The inventory includes both a ten-plate stove which would allow enough space for two pots and a small oven. However, it also included ironware and hooks for cooking over the fireplace. This is in comparison to Susannah Schenck Lapp who grew up in the Schenck House and then resided there with her husband John Lapp in the 1880s and 1890s. Despite many changes in technology in the 19th century, the presence of "a lot of chains" in the kitchen may relate to her either still using the fireplace for some cooking, or were for seasonal use when apple butter making in heavy kettles.

== Outbuildings ==
The surviving outbuildings include a red brick, two room building with a loft used either as a SpringHouse or summer kitchen. The duel interior end chimneys and proximity to the main house supports a function in conjunction with the kitchen of the main house. This is likely to be where the dairy butter, apple butter and cider were being processed. A second outbuilding in the form of a 1 1/2-story small barn with the roof extended to create a side stall without exterior walls was possibly either a Combination Structure or a small animal shelter where the sheep or swine were kept. The Non-population agriculture registers show the farming of swine and sheep. Two other structures, the barn which had a fore structure perpendicular to the main barn and a small building between the main house and barn, can be found on a 1927 blueprint of the lot.
