= Buffalo Gas Light Company Works =

- U.S. National Register of Historic Places
- New York State Register of Historic Places
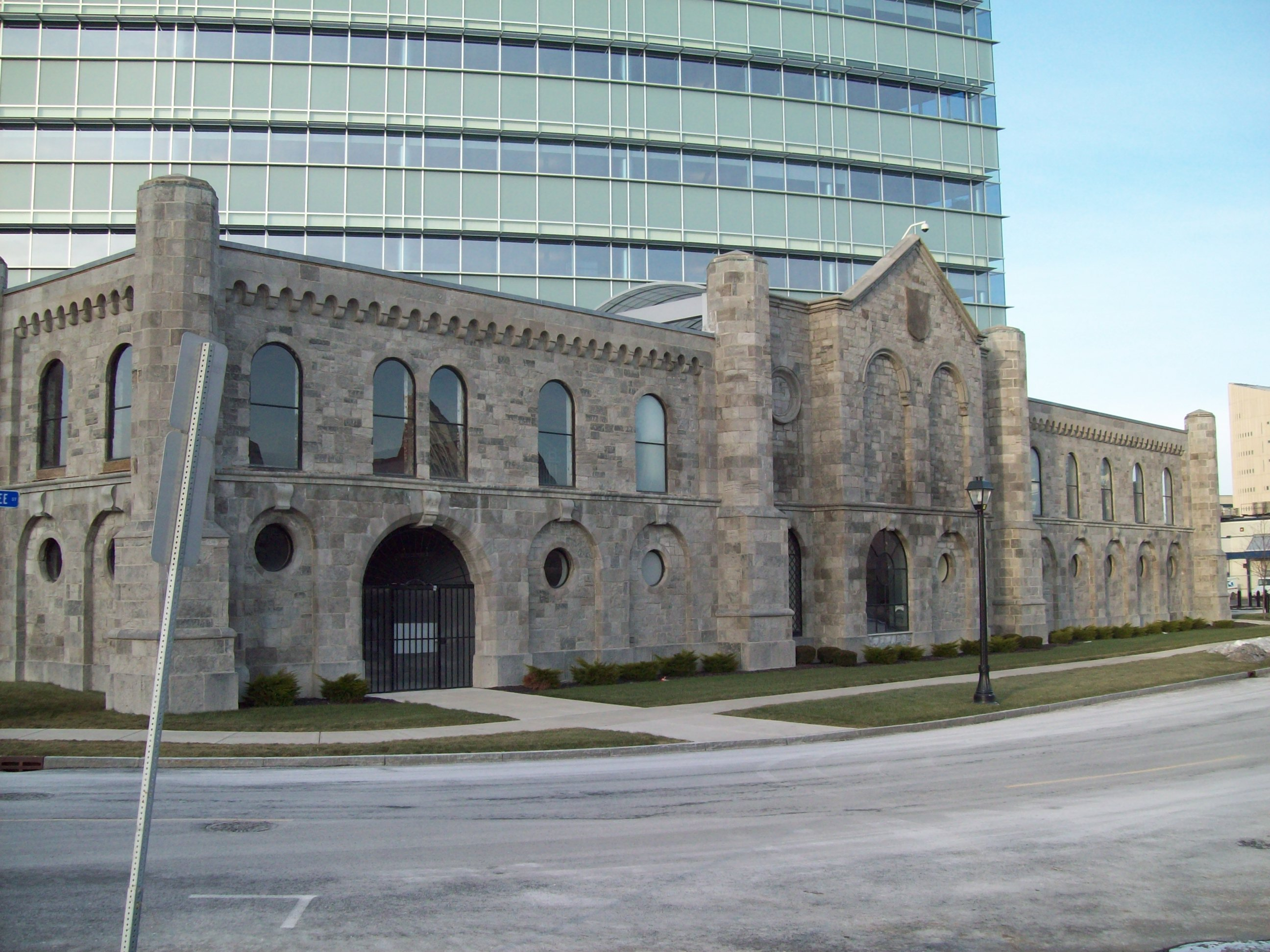
- Buffalo Gas Light Company Works, December 2009

- Location within New York Location within the United States
- Location: 249 W. Genesee St., Buffalo, New York
- Coordinates: 42°53′9″N 78°53′0″W
- Area: 3 acres (1.2 ha)
- Built: 1859
- Architects: Selkirk, John H.
- Architectural style: Norman
- NRHP reference No.: 76001215
- NYSRHP No.: 02940.000007

Significant dates
- Added to NRHP: September 1, 1976
- Designated NYSRHP: June 23, 1980

Buffalo Gas Light Company Works is a historic gas works located at Buffalo in Erie County, New York. After the main gas works structure was razed, the West Genesee Street facade was preserved and later incorporated into the headquarters of HealthNow New York.

It was listed on the National Register of Historic Places in 1976.
