= 17–21 Emerson Place Row =

Historic houses in New York, United States

- Formerly listed on the U.S. National Register of Historic Places
- As seen in 1981

- Location within New York Location within the United States
- Location: 17–21 Emerson Pl., Buffalo, New York
- Built: 1900
- Architect: Rice, Benjamin B.
- MPS: Masten Neighborhood Rows TR
- NRHP reference No.: 86000689

Significant dates
- Added to NRHP: March 19, 1986
- Removed from NRHP: May 20, 1988

17–21 Emerson Place Row was a set of historic rowhouses located at Buffalo in Erie County, New York. It was built in 1900, by land dealer and speculator George C. Rice and demolished in 1987 due to neglect.

It was listed on the National Register of Historic Places in 1986.
