= 33-61 Emerson Place Row =

Historic residential buildings in New York, United States

- U.S. National Register of Historic Places
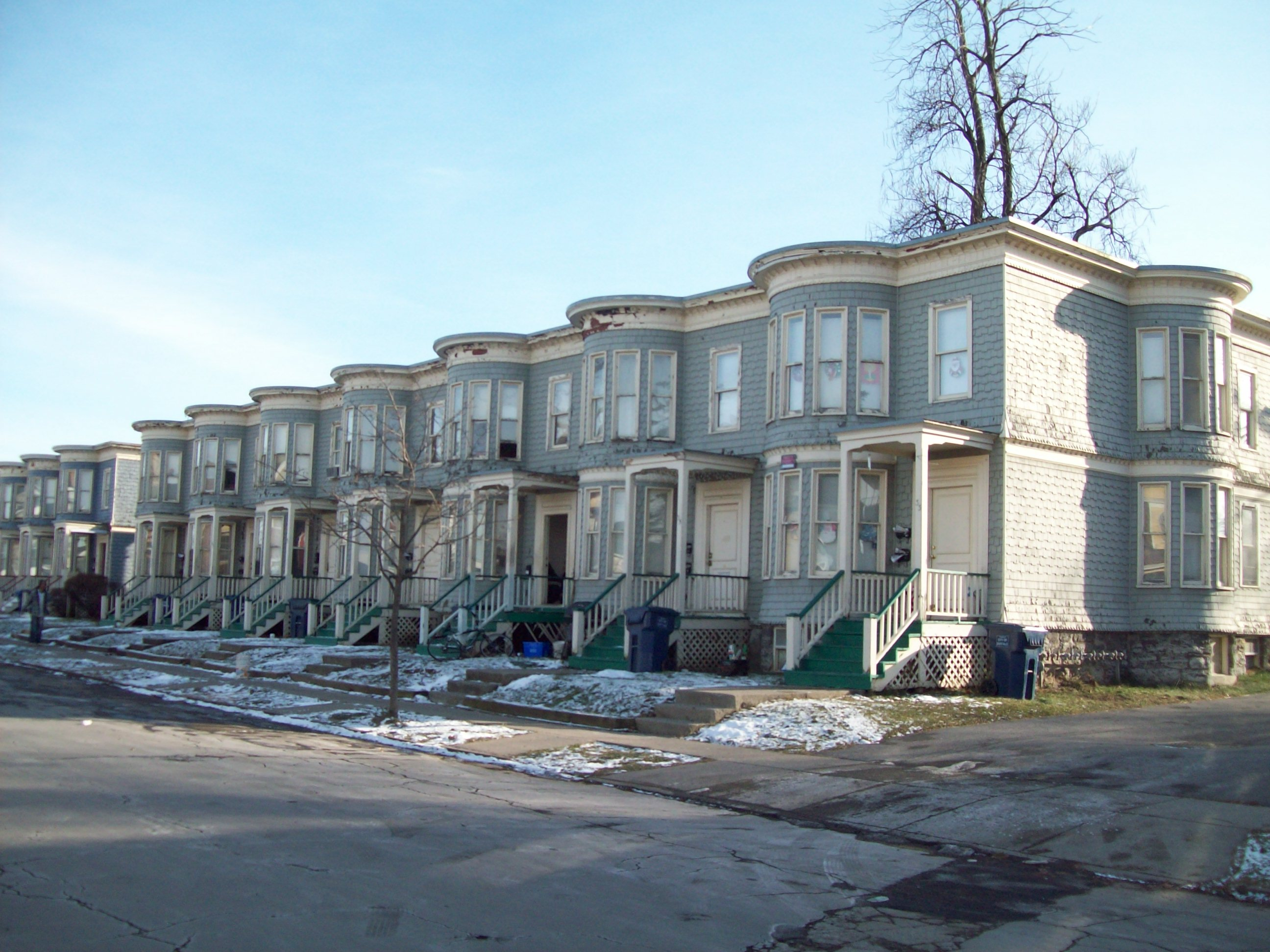
- 33-61 Emerson Place Row, Buffalo, NY, December 2009

- Location within New York Location within the United States
- Location: 33-61 Emerson Pl., Buffalo, New York
- Coordinates: 42°54′47″N 78°51′38″W
- Area: 1 acre (0.40 ha)
- Built: 1893
- Architect: Rice, Benjamin B.
- Architectural style: Colonial Revival, Stick/Eastlake, Shingle Style
- MPS: Masten Neighborhood Rows TR
- NRHP reference No.: 86000691
- Added to NRHP: March 19, 1986

33-61 Emerson Place Row is a set of historic rowhouses located at Buffalo in Erie County, New York. It is one of a rare surviving group of speculative multi-unit frame residences designed to resemble rowhouses in the city of Buffalo. It was built in 1893, by land dealer and speculator Benjamin B. Rice. The seven unit row features decorative shingle sheathing and two-story bow windows.

It was listed on the National Register of Historic Places in 1986.
