= Woodlawn Avenue Row =

- U.S. National Register of Historic Places
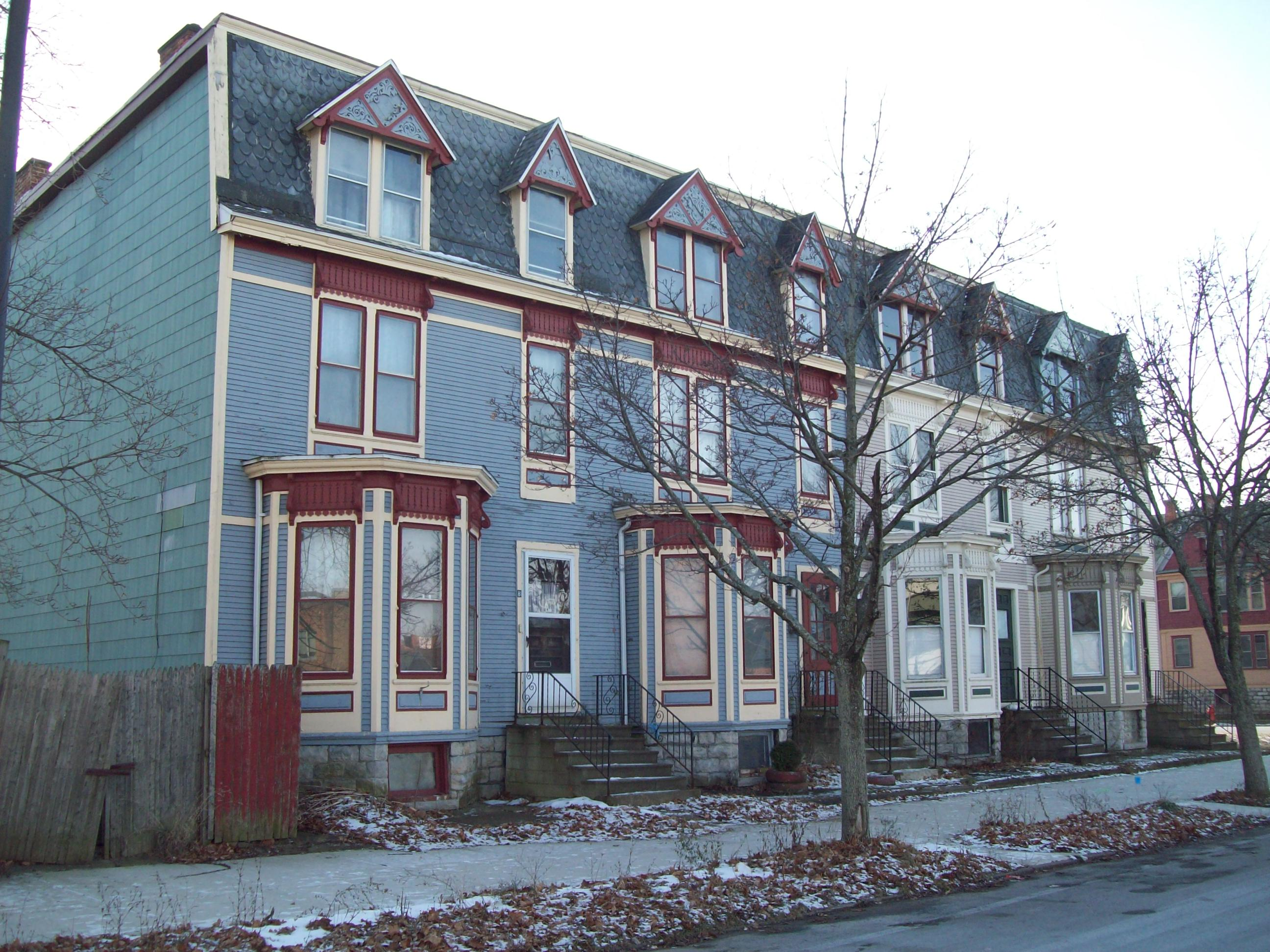
- Woodlawn Avenue Row, December 2009

- Location within New York Location within the United States
- Location: 75-81 Woodlawn Ave., Buffalo, New York
- Coordinates: 42°54′49″N 78°51′44″W
- Area: 0.5 acres (0.20 ha)
- Built: 1898
- Architect: Lautenslager, Louis F.
- Architectural style: Stick/Eastlake
- MPS: Masten Neighborhood Rows TR
- NRHP reference No.: 86000690
- Added to NRHP: March 19, 1986

Woodlawn Avenue Row is a set of historic rowhouses located at Buffalo in Erie County, New York. It is one of a rare surviving group of speculative multi-unit frame residences designed to resemble rowhouses in the city of Buffalo. The set of four frame, two story rowhouses was built in 1898.

It was listed on the National Register of Historic Places in 1986.
