= Engine House No. 2 and Hook and Ladder No. 9 =

- U.S. National Register of Historic Places
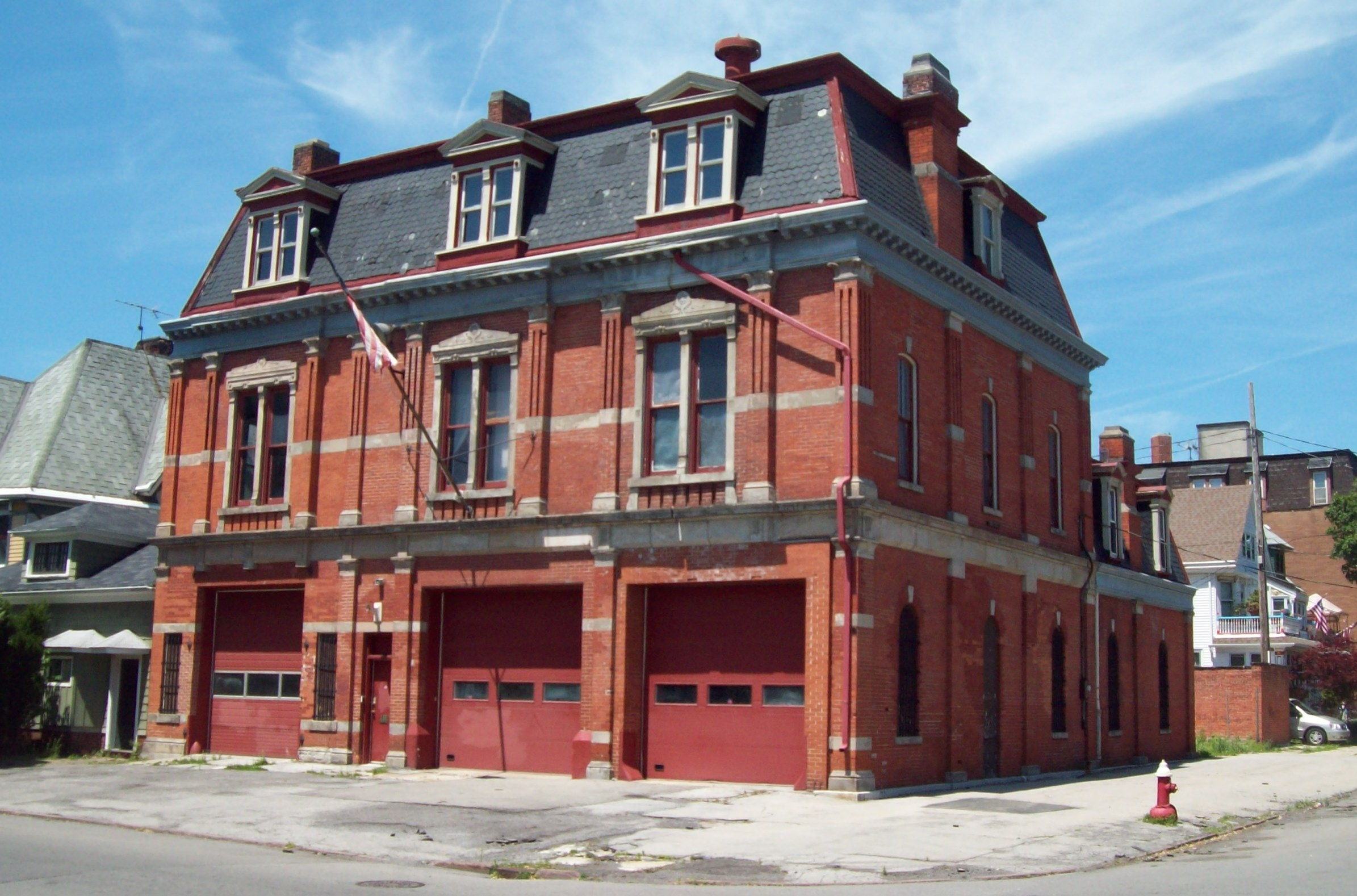
- Engine House No. 2 and Hook and Ladder No. 9, July 2011

- Location within New York Location within the United States
- Location: 310 Jersey St., Buffalo, New York
- Coordinates: 42°54′7.8372″N 78°53′11.2158″W
- Area: 0.17 acres (0.069 ha)
- Built: 1875
- Architect: Porter & Watkins, Eckel & Ackerman
- Architectural style: Second Empire
- NRHP reference No.: 11000272
- Added to NRHP: May 11, 2011

Engine House No. 2 and Hook and Ladder No. 9, also known as Jersey Street Firehouse, is a historic fire station located at Buffalo in Erie County, New York.

== History ==
It was built in 1875 and is a 2 1/2-story, L-shaped brick building with a mansard roof in the Second Empire style. A hook and ladder bay was added in 1897. The building was rebuilt in 1917 after a fire caused severe damage. The station was active until 1997, when it was closed as part of a consolidation in the Buffalo Fire Department. As of May 2011, the building was occupied by the paving contractor Beartooth Industries, LLC.

It was listed on the National Register of Historic Places in 2011.
