= National Register of Historic Places listings in Buffalo, New York =

Location of Buffalo in New York

This is a list of the National Register of Historic Places listings in Buffalo, New York.

This is intended to be a complete list of the properties and districts on the National Register of Historic Places in Buffalo, New York, United States. The locations of National Register properties and districts for which the latitude and longitude coordinates are included below, may be seen in a map.

There are 290 properties and districts listed on the National Register in Erie County. The city of Buffalo is the location of 205 of these properties and districts; they are listed here, while the other properties and districts are listed separately. Another two properties in the city were formerly listed but have been removed.

This National Park Service list is complete through NPS recent listings posted November 13, 2026.

Contents: Counties in New York
Albany (Albany) – Allegany – Bronx – Broome – Cattaraugus – Cayuga – Chautauqua – Chemung – Chenango – Clinton – Columbia – Cortland – Delaware – Dutchess (Poughkeepsie, Rhinebeck) – Erie (Buffalo) – Essex – Franklin – Fulton – Genesee – Greene – Hamilton – Herkimer – Jefferson – Kings – Lewis – Livingston – Madison – Monroe (Rochester) – Montgomery – Nassau – New York (Below 14th Street, 14th to 59th Streets, 59th to 110th Streets, Above 110th Street, Islands) – Niagara (Niagara Falls) – Oneida – Onondaga (Syracuse) – Ontario – Orange – Orleans – Oswego – Otsego – Putnam – Queens – Rensselaer – Richmond – Rockland – St. Lawrence – Saratoga – Schenectady – Schoharie – Schuyler – Seneca – Steuben – Suffolk – Sullivan – Tioga – Tompkins – Ulster – Warren – Washington – Wayne – Westchester (Northern, Southern, New Rochelle, Peekskill, Yonkers) – Wyoming – Yates

== Current listings ==
	Name on the Register	Image	Date listed	Location	Neighborhood	Description
1	20th Century Club	20th Century Club	May 11, 2011 (#11000270)	595 Delaware Ave. 42°54′01″N 78°52′23″W	Allentown	First club founded by women, for women, in the U.S.
2	33-61 Emerson Place Row	33-61 Emerson Place Row	March 19, 1986 (#86000691)	33-61 Emerson Pl. 42°54′47″N 78°51′38″W	Cold Spring	Frame rowhouses built in 1893
3	J.N. Adam-AM&A Historic District	J.N. Adam-AM&A Historic District	February 20, 2009 (#09000056)	Main St., E. Eagle St., Washington St., Ellicott St. 42°53′03″N 78°52′26″W	Downtown	Former J. N. Adam & Co. and AM&A's department store and warehouse complex
4	Albright-Knox Art Gallery	Albright-Knox Art Gallery	May 27, 1971 (#71000538)	1285 Elmwood Ave., in Delaware Park; 42°55′56″N 78°52′33″W	Elmwood Village	Contemporary and modern art gallery opened in 1905.
5	Aldrich & Ray Manufacturing Company Building	Aldrich & Ray Manufacturing Company Building	November 28, 2022 (#100008405)	1491 Niagara St. 42°55′30″N 78°53′52″W	Upper West Side	
6	Allentown Historic District	Allentown Historic District	April 21, 1980 (#80002605)	Off NY 384; also portions of Delaware, Elmwood, S. Elmwood, Linwood, Normal, Plymouth, Porter, and Richmond Aves., and Franklin and Hudson Sts. 42°53′58″N 78°52′47″W	all of Allentown and several adjoining sections of the Lower West Side and the Elmwood Village	Second set of boundaries represents a boundary increase of February 14, 2012. A historic district including parks designed by Frederick Law Olmsted, and 733 buildings.
7	Alling & Cory Buffalo Warehouse	Alling & Cory Buffalo Warehouse	February 17, 2010 (#10000026)	136 N. Division St. 42°52′59″N 78°52′11″W	Downtown	
8	American Grain Complex	American Grain Complex	August 7, 2012 (#12000475)	87 Childs St.; also 100 Childs St. 42°51′40″N 78°51′57″W	First Ward	Second address represents a boundary increase approved November 10, 2021.
9	American Radiator Company Factory Complex	American Radiator Company Factory Complex	September 29, 2015 (#15000674)	1801-1809 Elmwood Ave. 42°56′44″N 78°52′43″W	North Park	Buildings constructed over 40 years starting in the 1890s were a major research facility in addition to factory; recently converted into residential lofts.
10	Annunciation School	Annunciation School	December 5, 2008 (#08001139)	257 Lafayette Ave. 42°55′11″N 78°53′18″W	Upper West Side	Former parochial school
11	Austin Street Police Athletic League (PAL) Center		August 9, 2024 (#100010612)	348 Austin Street; 42°56′29″N 78°53′34″W		
12	Barcalo Manufacturing Company Factory	Barcalo Manufacturing Company Factory	August 17, 2020 (#100005457)	225 Louisiana St. 42°52′05″N 78°51′57″W	First Ward	
13	Bennett Apartments		August 13, 2026 (#100013311)	19-29 Benwood Avenue; 42°56′32″N 78°50′06″W		
14	Berkeley Apartments	Berkeley Apartments	October 15, 1987 (#87001852)	24 Johnson Park; 42°53′31″N 78°52′35″W	Downtown	Reinforced concrete building built 1894-1897
15	Charles Berrick's Sons Florida Street Houses	Charles Berrick's Sons Florida Street Houses	April 10, 2023 (#100008801)	84, 88, 90, 94, 96, 100, and 102 Florida St. 42°55′13″N 78°51′21″W	Hamlin Park	
16	Beth Jacob Cemetery		December 10, 2025 (#100012373)	23 Doat Street; 42°54′33″N 78°49′09″W		
17	Birge-Horton House	Birge-Horton House	July 16, 2004 (#04000703)	477 Delaware Ave. 42°53′50″N 78°52′28″W	Allentown	Rowhouse designed in 1895 and part of "The Midway"
18	Blessed Trinity Roman Catholic Church Buildings	Blessed Trinity Roman Catholic Church Buildings	August 3, 1979 (#79001579)	317 Leroy Ave; 42°55′57″N 78°50′03″W	Highland Park	Church in Lombard-Romanesque style built in 1923–1928 with noted mosaics
19	Boarding House at 72-74 Sycamore Street	Boarding House at 72-74 Sycamore Street	August 25, 2021 (#100004805)	72 Sycamore St. 42°53′20″N 78°52′02″W	Near East Side	
20	Brisbane Building	Brisbane Building	November 23, 2022 (#100008403)	395 Main St. 42°53′06″N 78°52′28″W	Downtown	
21	Buffalo and Erie County Historical Society Building	Buffalo and Erie County Historical Society Building	April 23, 1980 (#80002606)	25 Nottingham Ct. 42°56′07″N 78°52′35″W	Park Meadow	Built for Pan-American Exposition in 1901
22	Buffalo City Hall	Buffalo City Hall	January 15, 1999 (#98001611)	65 Niagara Sq. 42°53′12″N 78°52′45″W	Downtown	Classic 32 story Art Deco municipal building completed in 1931
23	The Buffalo Club	The Buffalo Club	April 22, 2021 (#100006481)	388 Delaware Ave. 42°53′41″N 78°52′32″W	Downtown	
24	Buffalo Electric Vehicle Company Building	Buffalo Electric Vehicle Company Building	June 10, 2005 (#05000571)	1219-1247 Main St. 42°54′25″N 78°52′02″W	Masten Park	Former automobile factory and showroom constructed in 1910
25	Buffalo Envelope Company Building		January 26, 2026 (#100012612)	268-270 Michigan Avenue; 42°52′45″N 78°52′11″W		
26	Buffalo Gas Light Company Works	Buffalo Gas Light Company Works	September 1, 1976 (#76001215)	249 W. Genesee St. 42°53′09″N 78°53′00″W	Downtown	Remains of gas works complex built originally in 1848
27	Buffalo General Electric Complex	Buffalo General Electric Complex	May 25, 2018 (#100002509)	960-996 Busti Ave & 990 Niagara St. 42°54′35″N 78°54′01″W	Upper West Side	Power station built from 1906 to 1923 helped bring electricity generated at Niagara Falls to city
28	Buffalo Lounge Company Building		December 29, 2025 (#100012417)	567 Exchange Street; 42°52′33″N 78°51′23″W		
29	Buffalo Main Light	Buffalo Main Light	July 19, 1984 (#84002383)	Buffalo River; 42°52′49″N 78°53′45″W	First Ward	Lighthouse established and lit in 1833 and deactivated in 1914
30	Buffalo Meter Company Building	Buffalo Meter Company Building	August 7, 2012 (#12000476)	2917 Main St. 42°56′39″N 78°49′51″W	Highland Park	
31	Buffalo Milk Company Building	Buffalo Milk Company Building	December 13, 2016 (#16000839)	885 Niagara St. 42°54′27″N 78°53′52″W	Lower West Side	Intact 1905 Renaissance Revival structure was first in city to be used for homogenization and pasteurization of milk
32	Buffalo North Breakwater South End Light	Buffalo North Breakwater South End Light	August 4, 1983 (#83001669)	Buffalo Harbor; 42°52′49″N 78°53′45″W	First Ward	Beacon lit in 1903 and removed in 1985
33	Buffalo Public School No. 24	Buffalo Public School No. 24	December 13, 2016 (#16000840)	775 Best St. 42°54′12″N 78°50′21″W	Humboldt Park	1901 school became home to city's first special education classes during 1930s.
34	Buffalo Public School #32-PS 32	Buffalo Public School #32-PS 32	August 12, 2022 (#100008002)	342 Clinton St. 42°53′00″N 78°51′43″W	Near East Side	
35	Buffalo Public School No. 44 (PS 44)	Buffalo Public School No. 44 (PS 44)	July 27, 2018 (#100002735)	1369 Broadway; 42°53′46″N 78°49′27″W	Broadway-Fillmore	Two phases of brick school building, first in 1909–10 and second in 1930, demonstrate evolution of standardized urban public school designs in the early 20th century.
36	Buffalo Public School No. 57 (PS 57)	Buffalo Public School No. 57 (PS 57)	July 27, 2018 (#100002736)	243 Sears Street; 42°53′36″N 78°50′08″W	Broadway-Fillmore	1914 Classical Revival school, originally built as extension of now-demolished main building, exemplifies standards of early 20th century urban public school design.
37	Buffalo Public School #75 (PS 75)		December 28, 2023 (#100009683)	57 Howard Street; 42°53′00″N 78°51′06″W		
38	Buffalo Public School No. 77 (PS 77)	Buffalo Public School No. 77 (PS 77)	July 24, 2017 (#100001361)	429 Plymouth Ave. 42°54′33″N 78°53′31″W	Lower West Side	1927 public school typifies standardization of school design in that era.
39	Buffalo Public School No. 78 (PS 78)	Buffalo Public School No. 78 (PS 78)	January 30, 2020 (#100004917)	345 Olympic Ave. 42°55′55″N 78°49′04″W	Kensington-Bailey	Intact 1927 public elementary school with all features of schools from that era
40	Buffalo Public School #92-PS 92	Buffalo Public School #92-PS 92	January 30, 2020 (#100008007)	340 Fougeron St. 42°54′30″N 78°49′35″W	Genesee-Moselle	
41	Buffalo Seminary	Buffalo Seminary	May 11, 2011 (#11000271)	205 Bidwell Parkway; 42°55′28″N 78°52′30″W	Elmwood Village	Mid-19th-century girls' school housed in 1909 Tudor Revival building
42	Buffalo Smelting Works	Buffalo Smelting Works	October 18, 2011 (#11000738)	23 Austin St. 42°56′07″N 78°54′14″W	Black Rock	
43	Buffalo State Hospital	Buffalo State Hospital	January 12, 1973 (#73001186)	400 Forest Ave. 42°55′49″N 78°52′59″W	Elmwood Village	Landmark defining architect H. H. Richardson's Richardsonian Romanesque style
44	Buffalo Tennis and Squash Club	Buffalo Tennis and Squash Club	December 5, 2008 (#08001141)	314 Elmwood Ave. 42°54′20″N 78°52′38″W	Elmwood Village	Clubhouse building located constructed in 1915-1916
45	Buffalo Trunk Manufacturing Company Building	Buffalo Trunk Manufacturing Company Building	February 17, 2010 (#10000027)	125 Cherry St. 42°53′38″N 78°51′40″W	Near East Side	
46	Buffalo Veterans Hospital Historic District	Buffalo Veterans Hospital Historic District	September 1, 2022 (#100008102)	3495 Bailey Ave. 42°57′06″N 78°48′49″W	Kensington-Bailey	
47	Buffalo Zoo Entrance Court	Buffalo Zoo Entrance Court	May 22, 2013 (#13000305)	Parkside Ave. & Amherst St. 42°56′23″N 78°51′06″W	Parkside	Surviving work from early 20th century by early African-American architect.
48	Building at 1389 Delaware Avenue		January 19, 2024 (#100009780)	1389 Delaware Avenue; 42°55′19″N 78°52′02″W	Delaware District	
49	F.N. Burt Company Factory	F.N. Burt Company Factory	March 6, 2013 (#13000053)	500 Seneca Street; 42°52′40″N 78°51′26″W	The Hydraulics	
50	F.N. Burt Company Factory "C"	F.N. Burt Company Factory "C"	April 17, 2017 (#100000891)	1502 Niagara Street; 42°55′30″N 78°53′53″W	Upper West Side	1911 factory built to then state of art
51	The Calumet	The Calumet	November 29, 2010 (#10000958)	46-58 W. Chippewa St. / 233 Franklin St. 42°53′25″N 78°52′29″W	Downtown	
52	Cazenovia Park-South Park System	Cazenovia Park-South Park System	March 30, 1982 (#82005028)	South Park, NW along McKinley Pkwy. to Cazenovia Park, NW along McKinley Pkwy. to Heacock Park; 42°50′22″N 78°49′16″W	South Buffalo	Park and parkways system located in South Buffalo; location of the Buffalo and Erie County Botanical Gardens
53	Chandler Street Industrial Buildings	Chandler Street Industrial Buildings	November 9, 2018 (#100003112)	27–63 Chandler Street; 42°56′35″N 78°53′23″W	Black Rock	Three intact buildings built 1902–03 to take advantage of New York Central's newly constructed Buffalo Belt Line
54	CLARA BROWN (sloop)	CLARA BROWN (sloop)	March 20, 2013 (#13000098)	First Buffalo River Marina, 32 Fuhrmann Blvd. 42°52′26″N 78°52′52″W	First Ward	Distinctive sloop designed for races on Lake Champlain by noted naval architect John G. Alden
55	Robert T. Coles House and Studio	Robert T. Coles House and Studio	August 30, 2011 (#11000594)	321 Humboldt Pkwy. 42°55′30″N 78°50′50″W	Hamlin Park	Innovative modernist home of prominent African-American architect anticipated expansion of street by putting rear of building to it
56	Colonial Flats and Annex	Colonial Flats and Annex	April 30, 2018 (#100002366)	399-401 Delaware Ave. 42°53′43″N 78°52′30″W	Allentown	1896 brick structure is the only apartment building downtown built for that purpose; current structure reflects three different phases of construction
57	Colored Musicians Club	Colored Musicians Club	August 28, 2018 (#100002833)	145 Broadway; 42°53′12″N 78°52′04″W	Near East Side	Home to oldest continuously operating African American musicians' organization in the U.S.
58	COLUMBIA (Steamer)	COLUMBIA (Steamer)	November 2, 1979 (#79001171)	Marine A Grain Elevator, Buffalo River at Silo City Row; 42°51′39″N 78°51′44″W	First Ward	Designed by noted naval architect Frank E. Kirby; one of the last two remaining turn-of-the-century excursion steamships in existence, having ferried passengers from Detroit to Bois Blanc Island until 1991. Currently docked on the Buffalo River while undergoing repairs. Register record transferred to Buffalo December 20, 2017.
59	Commercial Buildings at 136-142 Seneca Street		August 21, 2025 (#100012133)	136-142 Seneca Street; 42°52′48″N 78°52′17″W		
60	Commercial Row at Broadway and Michigan Avenue		April 28, 2025 (#100010706)	163-167 Broadway (Route 130); 42°53′12″N 78°52′02″W		
61	Concordia Cemetery	Concordia Cemetery	February 28, 2008 (#08000106)	438 Walden Ave. 42°54′22″N 78°49′11″W	Genesee-Moselle	German Lutheran Cemetery established in 1859
62	Concrete-Central Elevator	Concrete-Central Elevator	May 19, 2003 (#03000410)	175 Buffalo River; 42°51′37″N 78°51′20″W	First Ward	Grain elevator built between 1915 and 1917 and in operation until 1973
63	Connecticut Street Armory	Connecticut Street Armory	January 12, 1995 (#94001543)	184 Connecticut St. 42°54′14″N 78°53′39″W	Lower West Side	National Guard armory built in 1899
64	Continental Baking Company Factory	Continental Baking Company Factory	November 8, 2021 (#100007098)	356 Fougeron St. 42°54′30″N 78°49′43″W	Genesee-Moselle	
65	Corpus Christi R. C. Church Complex	Corpus Christi R. C. Church Complex	June 27, 2007 (#07000630)	199 Clark St. 42°53′29″N 78°50′10″W	Broadway-Fillmore	Massive sandstone church built about 1900
66	County and City Hall	County and City Hall	May 24, 1976 (#76001216)	92 Franklin St. 42°53′03″N 78°52′42″W	Downtown	Granite courthouse building constructed between 1871 and 1875
67	Harlow C. Curtiss Building	Harlow C. Curtiss Building	December 5, 2008 (#08001142)	204-210 Franklin St. 42°53′21″N 78°52′33″W	Downtown	Office building built in 1912
68	Dayton House	Dayton House	October 18, 2011 (#11000739)	243 Dearborn St. 42°56′09″N 78°54′05″W	Black Rock	
69	Delaware Avenue Historic District	Delaware Avenue Historic District	January 17, 1974 (#74001232)	Western side of Delaware Ave. between North and Bryant Sts. 42°54′20″N 78°52′23″W	Delaware District	Historic district encompassing area once known as Millionaires' Row.
70	Delaware Avenue Medical Center	Delaware Avenue Medical Center	August 8, 2019 (#100004247)	1275 Delaware Avenue; 42°55′02″N 78°52′05″W	Delaware District	International Style 1958 building that was the first in the city built to house multiple physicians' practices; considered the most advanced such medical center in the country at the time
71	Delaware Avenue Methodist Episcopal Church	Delaware Avenue Methodist Episcopal Church	November 15, 2003 (#03001149)	339 Delaware Ave. 42°53′37″N 78°52′31″W	Downtown	Church constructed in two phases between 1871 and 1876; now home to Righteous Babe Records
72	Delaware, Lackawanna, and Western (DL&W) Train Shed	Delaware, Lackawanna, and Western (DL&W) Train Shed	September 14, 2023 (#100009321)	15 Main St. 42°52′25″N 78°52′33″W		
73	Delaware Park-Front Park System	Delaware Park-Front Park System	March 30, 1982 (#82005029)	Front Park, Porter Ave. to Symphony Cir., north along Richmond Ave., Bidwell Pkwy., Gates Cir. and Delaware Park; 42°55′10″N 78°52′47″W	Includes portions of the Lower West Side, Delaware District, and Elmwood Village	Park and parkway system in north and west Buffalo; connects city neighborhoods and major cultural landmarks such as Albright-Knox Art Gallery, Buffalo and Erie County Historical Society, Buffalo Zoo, and Kleinhans Music Hall
74	Edward A. Diebolt House	Edward A. Diebolt House	July 12, 2006 (#06000565)	62 Niagara Falls Blvd. 42°57′53″N 78°49′23″W	University Heights	Colonial Revival style frame house built in 1922-1923
75	William Dorsheimer House	William Dorsheimer House	November 21, 1980 (#80002607)	434 Delaware Ave. 42°53′46″N 78°52′31″W	Allentown	Brick dwelling designed and built in 1868 by Henry Hobson Richardson (1838–1886) for William Dorsheimer (1832–1888)
76	Durham Memorial A.M.E. Zion Church	Durham Memorial A.M.E. Zion Church	September 15, 1983 (#83001670)	174 E. Eagle St. 42°53′00″N 78°52′07″W	Near East Side	African American brick church constructed in 1920
77	Eberz House	Eberz House	October 18, 2011 (#11000740)	285 Dearborn St. 42°56′14″N 78°54′08″W	Black Rock	
78	EDWARD M. COTTER (fireboat)	EDWARD M. COTTER (fireboat)	June 28, 1996 (#96000968)	Junction of Michigan and Ohio Sts. on the Buffalo River; 42°51′41″N 78°50′41″W	Cobblestone District	Fireboat built in 1900 and rebuilt in 1953
79	Elmwood Historic District–East	Elmwood Historic District–East	March 22, 2016 (#16000108)	Portions of Auburn, Bird, Cleveland, Delaware, Elmwood, Forest & Hodge Aves., Anderson, Atlantic & Berkley Pls. 42°55′03″N 78°52′31″W	The entire portion of the Elmwood Village lying to the east of Elmwood Avenue, plus an adjoining portion of the Delaware District	Early suburban neighborhood that developed along trolley lines
80	Elmwood Historic District–West	Elmwood Historic District–West	December 4, 2012 (#12000996)	Roughly Ashland, Auburn, Bird, Claremont, Elmwood, Forest, Highland, Hodge, Lafayette, Lexington, Norwood Aves. 42°55′07″N 78°52′43″W	The entire portion of the Elmwood Village lying to the west of Elmwood Avenue, plus adjoining portions of the Upper and Lower West Sides	Early suburban neighborhood that developed along trolley lines
81	Engine House No. 2 and Hook and Ladder No. 9	Engine House No. 2 and Hook and Ladder No. 9	May 11, 2011 (#11000272)	310 Jersey St. 42°54′08″N 78°53′11″W	Lower West Side	
82	Engine House No. 28	Engine House No. 28	May 25, 2001 (#01000554)	1170 Lovejoy St. 42°53′23″N 78°48′18″W	Lovejoy	Queen Anne style firehouse built in 1897
83	Faith Missionary Baptist Church	Faith Missionary Baptist Church	July 27, 2018 (#100002737)	626 Humboldt Parkway; 42°55′05″N 78°50′34″W	Delavan-Grider	Synagogue built in 1924 for area's Jewish population has since become an African-American church
84	Fargo Estate Historic District	Fargo Estate Historic District	February 2, 2016 (#15001024)	Portions of Fargo, Normal, Plymouth, Porter, Prospect & West Aves., Jersey & Pennsylvania Sts., Cobb Alley; 42°54′03″N 78°53′26″W	Lower West Side	Estate demolished at beginning of the 20th century led to rapid development of middle class housing
85	Fedders Manufacturing Company Factory	Fedders Manufacturing Company Factory	February 25, 2022 (#100007439)	31-71 Tonawanda St. 42°55′47″N 78°53′50″W	Black Rock	
86	First Unitarian Church of Buffalo	First Unitarian Church of Buffalo	June 30, 2015 (#15000367)	695 Elmwood Ave. 42°54′56″N 78°52′35″W	Elmwood Village	
87	Forest Lawn Cemetery	Forest Lawn Cemetery	May 10, 1990 (#90000688)	1411 Delaware Ave. 42°55′38″N 78°51′44″W	Delaware District	Cemetery of 250 acres (1.0 km^{2}) founded in 1849
88	Fosdick-Masten Park High School	Fosdick-Masten Park High School	June 30, 1983 (#83001672)	Masten Ave. and E. North St. 42°54′11″N 78°51′38″W	Masten Park	Public high school building built 1912-1914
89	Garret Club	Garret Club	January 4, 2007 (#06001212)	91 Cleveland Ave. 42°55′04″N 78°52′22″W	Elmwood Village	Former clubhouse building built in 1929
90	Gates Circle Medical Building		January 19, 2024 (#100009751)	50 Gates Circle; 42°55′16″N 78°52′02″W	Delaware District	
91	Gates Manor Apartment Building		August 3, 2026 (#100013291)	870 Lafayette Avenue; 42°55′15″N 78°51′58″W		
92	General Electric Tower	General Electric Tower	September 12, 2008 (#08000865)	535 Washington St. 42°53′19″N 78°52′20″W	Downtown	Beaux-Arts Classical Revival style office building built in 1912
93	The Great Atlantic and Pacific Tea Company Warehouse	The Great Atlantic and Pacific Tea Company Warehouse	January 5, 2016 (#15000819)	545 Swan St. 42°52′41″N 78°51′27″W	The Hydraulics	Primary warehouse for the first U.S. nationwide retailer, built in 1917
94	E.M. Hager & Sons Company Building	E.M. Hager & Sons Company Building	May 22, 2013 (#13000306)	141 Elm Street; 42°53′07″N 78°52′10″W	Downtown	One of the few planing mills left in city, built in 1878
95	Hamlin Park Historic District	Hamlin Park Historic District	July 3, 2013 (#13000462)	Beverly, Donaldson, Hamlin, & Lonsdale Rds., Blaine, Butler, E. Delevan, Goulding, Hughes, Jefferson & Loring Aves. 42°55′13″N 78°50′53″W	Hamlin Park	Early developed neighborhood became home to many middle-class African-Americans
96	Edmund B. Hayes Hall	Edmund B. Hayes Hall	June 21, 2016 (#16000394)	3435 Main St. 42°57′12″N 78°49′14″W	University Heights	Expanded from an almshouse in 1925–26 to become main building of unified UB campus
97	Hellenic Orthodox Church of the Annunciation	Hellenic Orthodox Church of the Annunciation	November 13, 2002 (#02001329)	1000 Delaware Ave. 42°54′39″N 78°52′20″W	Delaware District	Gothic Revival style church constructed in 1906 as home to North Presbyterian Church
98	Hotel Lafayette	Hotel Lafayette	August 19, 2010 (#10000555)	391 Washington St. 42°53′04″N 78°52′22″W	Downtown	
99	Houk Manufacturing Co.	Houk Manufacturing Co.	February 14, 2014 (#14000003)	300–320 Grote St., 1686–1700 Elmwood Ave. 42°56′32″N 78°52′48″W	Black Rock	
100	House at 218 Dearborn Street	House at 218 Dearborn Street	October 18, 2011 (#11000741)	218 Dearborn St. 42°56′07″N 78°54′07″W	Black Rock	
101	James and Fanny How House	James and Fanny How House	May 23, 1997 (#97000415)	41 St. Catherine's Crt. 42°54′59″N 78°52′28″W	Elmwood Village	Tudor Revival house designed in 1924
102	E. & B. Holmes Machinery Company Building	E. & B. Holmes Machinery Company Building	June 2, 2009 (#09000376)	55-59 Chicago St. 42°52′11″N 78°52′08″W	First Ward	Former barrel machinery manufacturing complex
103	Edgar W. Howell House	Edgar W. Howell House	November 15, 2007 (#07001203)	52 Lexington Ave. 42°54′46″N 78°52′21″W	Delaware District	Late Victorian Eclectic house dated to 1889
104	The Huyler Building	The Huyler Building	February 8, 2012 (#12000010)	374 Delaware Ave. 42°53′41″N 78°52′32″W	Allentown	
105	Illinois Alcohol Company Building		August 26, 2022 (#100008027)	1432 Niagara St. 42°55′24″N 78°53′54″W	Upper West Side	
106	Ingleside Home	Ingleside Home	May 25, 2018 (#100002511)	70 Harvard Place; 42°55′10″N 78°51′47″W	Oxford	1929 Colonial Revival building for institution that provided social services and health care to women in need through 1976. Currently being remodeled into apartments.
107	Iroquois Door Company Building		December 29, 2025 (#100012418)	619-659 Exchange Street; 42°52′31″N 78°51′15″W		
108	Edwin M. and Emily S. Johnston House	Edwin M. and Emily S. Johnston House	May 23, 1997 (#97000416)	24 Tudor Pl. 42°55′01″N 78°52′30″W	Elmwood Village	Colonial Revival house designed in 1934 by Bley & Lyman
109	John Kam Company Malt House & Kiln House	John Kam Company Malt House & Kiln House	June 28, 2021 (#100006684)	356 Hertel Ave. 42°56′45″N 78°53′42″W	West Hertel	
110	The Kamman Building	The Kamman Building	March 1, 2010 (#10000043)	755 Seneca St. 42°52′33″N 78°50′57″W	The Hydraulics	
111	The Karnak Flats	The Karnak Flats	December 13, 2016 (#16000841)	87 Whitney Place; 42°53′36″N 78°52′53″W	Lower West Side	1898 Colonial Revival apartment building targeted to affluent buyers looking to move out of downtown
112	Col. William Kelly House	Col. William Kelly House	May 23, 1997 (#97000414)	36 Tudor Place; 42°55′01″N 78°52′30″W	Elmwood Village	Colonial Revival house constructed in 1937
113	Kensington Gardens Apartment Complex	Kensington Gardens Apartment Complex	December 7, 2010 (#10000989)	1, 2, 3 W. Cleveland Dr. 42°56′30″N 78°47′59″W	Kensington-Bailey	
114	Martin Luther King, Jr. Park	Martin Luther King, Jr. Park	March 30, 1982 (#82005027)	Roughly bounded by Northampton St., E. Parade Ave., Best St. and Kensington Expressway; 42°54′19″N 78°50′26″W	Humboldt Park	Location of the Buffalo Museum of Science; park designed by Frederick Law Olmsted
115	Kleinhans Music Hall	Kleinhans Music Hall	June 29, 1989 (#89001235)	Symphony Circle; 42°54′06″N 78°53′00″W	Lower West Side	Home of the Buffalo Philharmonic Orchestra and designed by Eliel Saarinen with his son Eero Saarinen, built 1938-1940
116	Kreiner Malt House and Grain Elevator	Kreiner Malt House and Grain Elevator	December 8, 2017 (#100001883)	50 Elk St. 42°52′11″N 78°51′08″W	The Valley	
117	Lafayette Avenue Presbyterian Church	Lafayette Avenue Presbyterian Church	August 21, 2009 (#09000630)	875 Elmwood Ave. 42°55′15″N 78°52′37″W	Elmwood Village	
118	Lafayette Flats	Lafayette Flats	December 21, 2020 (#100005913)	115-135 Lafayette Ave. 42°55′12″N 78°53′38″W	Upper West Side	
119	Lafayette High School	Lafayette High School	December 3, 1980 (#80002608)	370 Lafayette Ave. 42°55′15″N 78°53′05″W	Upper West Side	Public high school building built 1901-1903
120	Laurel and Michigan Avenues Row	Laurel and Michigan Avenues Row	March 19, 1986 (#86000688)	1335-1345 Michigan Ave. 42°54′36″N 78°51′45″W	Cold Spring	Former frame rowhouse structure demolished in 1997
121	Linde Air Products Factory	Linde Air Products Factory	September 11, 2017 (#100001584)	155 Chandler St. 42°56′36″N 78°53′09″W	Black Rock	First oxygen preparation facility in U.S. built in 1907
122	Macedonia Baptist Church	Macedonia Baptist Church	February 12, 1974 (#74001233)	511 Michigan Ave. 42°53′10″N 78°52′03″W	Near East Side	African American Baptist church constructed in 1845, also known as the Michigan Street Baptist Church
123	Manze Block		August 4, 2025 (#100012062)	461-471 Niagara Street; 42°53′48″N 78°53′16″W		
124	Market Square Historic District	Market Square Historic District	October 18, 2011 (#11000743)	Amherst St. between Niagara and Tonawanda Sts., and portions of Dearborn and East Sts. 42°56′06″N 78°54′01″W	Black Rock	
125	Darwin D. Martin House Complex	Darwin D. Martin House Complex	December 30, 1975 (#75001185)	123 Jewett Parkway; 42°56′11″N 78°50′53″W	Parkside	House and related structures designed by Frank Lloyd Wright. Reference number 75001185 is for the original 1975 NRHP designation; the National Historic Landmark designation for the same property (1986) is under a different reference number, 86000160.
126	H. A. Meldrum Company Building	H. A. Meldrum Company Building	May 29, 2013 (#13000330)	265–267 Pearl St. 42°53′11″N 78°52′31″W	Downtown	Early 20th-century home of department store
127	The Mentholatum Company Building	The Mentholatum Company Building	February 21, 2017 (#100000657)	1360 Niagara St. 42°55′16″N 78°53′56″W	Upper West Side	
128	Meteor Manufacturing Corporation Building		December 29, 2025 (#100012419)	26 Glenwood Avenue; 42°54′45″N 78°51′53″W		
129	C. W. Miller Livery Stable	C. W. Miller Livery Stable	December 11, 2007 (#07001259)	75 W. Huron St. 42°53′29″N 78°52′34″W	Downtown	Late 19th century multi-story livery stable
130	Monarch Knitting Company Factory	Monarch Knitting Company Factory	March 7, 2019 (#100003432)	10 Doat St. 42°54′35″N 78°49′15″W	Genesee-Moselle	
131	Monroe Motor Car Company Building and the Main Garage Company Building		July 11, 2022 (#100007891)	1786-1796 Main St., 1040 Lafayette Ave. 42°55′15″N 78°51′32″W	Oxford	
132	Rev. J. Edward Nash Sr. House	Rev. J. Edward Nash Sr. House	January 4, 2007 (#06001210)	36 Nash St. 42°53′09″N 78°52′01″W	Near East Side	Queen Anne style dwelling constructed in 1892
133	New York Central Black Rock Freight House	New York Central Black Rock Freight House	May 18, 2018 (#MP100002461)	68–120 Tonawanda St. 42°55′56″N 78°53′51″W	Black Rock	Only remaining rail freight house in the city
134	New York Central Terminal	New York Central Terminal	September 7, 1984 (#84002389)	495 Paderewski Dr. 42°53′18″N 78°49′54″W	Broadway-Fillmore	Former central passenger terminal for New York Central Railroad
135	Niagara Hall		August 12, 2025 (#100012132)	831-833 Niagara Street; 42°54′21″N 78°53′47″W		
136	Niagara Lithograph Company	Niagara Lithograph Company	December 21, 2020 (#100005920)	1050 Niagara St. 42°54′44″N 78°54′00″W	Upper West Side	
137	Niagara Machine and Tool Works Factory	Niagara Machine and Tool Works Factory	March 26, 2018 (#100002255)	631 & 683 Northland Ave. 42°55′08″N 78°50′05″W	Delavan-Grider	1910 industrial facility is one of the oldest built in 20th-century Buffalo
138	Norstar Building		January 26, 2026 (#100012611)	560 Main Street; 42°53′20″N 78°52′24″W		
139	North Park Branch Library	North Park Branch Library	November 9, 2018 (#100003113)	2351 Delaware Ave. 42°56′54″N 78°52′04″W	North Park	1928 building is only Tudor Revival branch library in city designed by city architect Howard Beck
140	Packard Motor Car Showroom and Storage Facility	Packard Motor Car Showroom and Storage Facility	July 14, 2006 (#06000561)	1325 Main St. 42°54′35″N 78°51′59″W	Cold Spring	Reinforced concrete automobile showroom designed in 1926 by Albert Kahn
141	Parke Apartments	Parke Apartments	May 30, 2007 (#07000492)	33 Gates Circle; 42°55′14″N 78°52′08″W	Delaware District	Large apartment building built 1926-1927
142	Parkside Candy Shoppe and Factory	Parkside Candy Shoppe and Factory	November 16, 2015 (#15000799)	3208 Main St. 42°57′06″N 78°49′40″W	University Heights	Working candy shop built in late 1920s, still making its own product on site
143	Parkside East Historic District	Parkside East Historic District	October 17, 1986 (#86002817)	Roughly bounded by Parkside Ave., Amherst St., Colvin Ave., New York Central RR tracks, Main St., and Humboldt Ave. 42°56′09″N 78°50′59″W	Parkside	Historic district of 1,769 contributing structures developed primarily from 1876 to 1936, as a middle class residential neighborhood
144	Parkside West Historic District	Parkside West Historic District	December 10, 1986 (#86003372)	Roughly bounded by Amherst St., Nottingham Terr., Middlesex Rd., and Delaware Ave. 42°56′15″N 78°52′01″W	Park Meadow	Historic district of 137 contributing structures developed primarily from 1923 to 1940, as a middle class residential neighborhood
145	Pierce Arrow Factory Complex	Pierce Arrow Factory Complex	October 1, 1974 (#74001234)	Elmwood and Great Arrow Aves. 42°56′34″N 78°52′26″W	Park Meadow	Former Pierce-Arrow automobile factory complex and designed by Albert Kahn in about 1906
146	Playter-King-Felthousen House		September 2, 2025 (#100012185)	617 Niagara Street; 42°54′02″N 78°53′29″W		
147	Prospect Hill Historic District	Prospect Hill Historic District	October 4, 2016 (#16000694)	Columbus Pkwy., Columbus Park W., Busti & Rhode Island Aves., Niagara & Vermont Sts. 42°54′22″N 78°53′55″W	Lower West Side	Streetcar suburb built over a century starting from 1860s on former estate was home to many successful Italian Americans in Buffalo
148	Prudential (Guaranty) Building	Prudential (Guaranty) Building	March 20, 1973 (#73001187)	Church and Pearl Sts. 42°52′58″N 78°52′36″W	Downtown	Early skyscraper office building designed by Louis Sullivan and Dankmar Adler, and built in 1894, also known as the Prudential Building
149	Public School No. 60	Public School No. 60	August 18, 2014 (#14000489)	238 Ontario St. 42°57′04″N 78°54′12″W	Riverside	Early 20th-century school instrumental in developing the Black Rock neighborhood
150	Public School No. 63	Public School No. 63	August 25, 2016 (#16000587)	91 Lisbon Ave. 42°56′51″N 78°49′37″W	Kensington-Bailey	1917 building, expanded eight years later, is excellent surviving example of early 20th-century open-plan standardized school. Soon to be converted into apartments.
151	The Rae Flats and The Raleigh	The Rae Flats and The Raleigh	December 13, 2016 (#16000842)	346 and 354 Franklin St. 42°53′40″N 78°52′27″W	Allentown	1890s apartment buildings representing transformation of apartment living during that era
152	Richmond Avenue Methodist-Episcopal Church	Richmond Avenue Methodist-Episcopal Church	December 5, 2008 (#08001143)	525 W. Ferry St. 42°54′56″N 78°52′53″W	Elmwood Village	Church complex constructed between 1885 and 1898 built of Medina sandstone; now home to Upper West Side Arts Center
153	Riverside Park	Riverside Park	March 30, 1982 (#82005026)	Roughly bounded by Vulcan, Tonawanda, Crowley, and Niagara St. 42°57′20″N 78°54′32″W	Riverside	Park located in northwest Buffalo overlooking the Niagara River
154	Robertson–Cataract Electric Building	Robertson–Cataract Electric Building	February 8, 2012 (#12000011)	100, 126 S. Elmwood; 42°53′18″N 78°52′46″W	Downtown	
155	Theodore Roosevelt Inaugural National Historic Site	Theodore Roosevelt Inaugural National Historic Site	November 2, 1966 (#66000516)	641 Delaware Ave. 42°57′20″N 78°54′32″W	Allentown	Home where Theodore Roosevelt took the oath of office as President of the United States on September 14, 1901, following the assassination of William McKinley
156	J.W. Ruger & Deck Bros. Building	J.W. Ruger & Deck Bros. Building	November 23, 2022 (#100008402)	220-222 Chicago St. 42°52′27″N 78°52′03″W	First Ward	
157	Sacred Heart Roman Catholic Church and Convent		November 27, 2024 (#100011076)	198 Emslie Street; 42°52′55″N 78°50′56″W		
158	Sattler Theater		November 18, 2024 (#100010985)	512 Broadway; 42°53′23″N 78°51′18″W		
159	Saturn Club	Saturn Club	May 19, 2005 (#05000444)	977 Delaware Ave. 42°54′38″N 78°52′13″W	Delaware District	Tudor Revival clubhouse structure opened in 1922
160	Schaefer and Brother Malt House	Schaefer and Brother Malt House	December 3, 2019 (#100004737)	520 Seventh St. 42°53′55″N 78°53′31″W	Lower West Side	1880 malt house with attached grain elevator later used as chocolate factory
161	School 13	School 13	March 15, 2005 (#05000161)	266-268 Oak St. 42°53′20″N 78°52′13″W	Downtown	Former school building built in 1915
162	Seeger-Scherer Furniture Store Building	Seeger-Scherer Furniture Store Building	May 4, 2026 (#100012960)	122-126 Genesee Street; 42°53′24″N 78°52′11″W		
163	Shea's Buffalo Theater	Shea's Buffalo Theater	May 6, 1975 (#75001186)	646 Main St. 42°53′29″N 78°52′25″W	Downtown	Former movie palace originally called Shea's Buffalo and opened in 1926
164	Shea's Seneca Building	Shea's Seneca Building	December 8, 2017 (#100001884)	2178 Seneca St. 42°51′12″N 78°48′26″W	South Buffalo	
165	Sibley and Holmwood Candy Factory and Witkop and Holmes Headquarters	Sibley and Holmwood Candy Factory and Witkop and Holmes Headquarters	July 11, 2014 (#14000398)	149 & 145 Swan Street; 42°52′50″N 78°52′13″W	Near East Side	Well-preserved factory near downtown recently remodeled into apartments
166	Sinclair, Rooney & Co. Building	Sinclair, Rooney & Co. Building	February 2, 2016 (#15001025)	465 Washington St. 42°53′12″N 78°52′29″W	Downtown	1909 factory building meant to be flexible and adaptable for different kinds of manufacturing
167	St. Andrew's Episcopal Church	St. Andrew's Episcopal Church	June 9, 2010 (#10000333)	3105 Main St. 42°50′07″N 78°52′03″W	University Heights	
168	St. Andrew's Evangelical Lutheran Church Complex	St. Andrew's Evangelical Lutheran Church Complex	September 8, 1983 (#83001674)	Sherman and Peckham Sts. 42°53′17″N 78°50′48″W	Broadway-Fillmore	Former Evangelical Lutheran church complex consisting of church, parish house, and school constructed 1859-1892
169	St. Francis Xavier Roman Catholic Parish Complex	St. Francis Xavier Roman Catholic Parish Complex	August 20, 2009 (#09000631)	157 East St. 42°56′09″N 78°54′01″W	Black Rock	
170	St. John Kanty Roman Catholic Church Complex	St. John Kanty Roman Catholic Church Complex	November 8, 2021 (#100007100)	101 Swinburne St. 42°53′43″N 78°49′14″W	Broadway-Fillmore	
171	St. Paul's Cathedral (Buffalo)	St. Paul's Cathedral (Buffalo)	December 23, 1987 (#87002600)	125 and/or 139 Pearl St. 42°52′58″N 78°52′35″W	Downtown	The cathedral of the Episcopal Diocese of Western New York; built 1849–1851 and designed by Richard Upjohn
172	Sts. Peter and Paul Orthodox Church Complex	Sts. Peter and Paul Orthodox Church Complex	August 10, 2015 (#15000513)	40 Benzinger St. 42°53′10″N 78°48′25″W	Lovejoy	Oldest Orthodox church in Buffalo and oldest in use in the Orthodox Diocese of New York and New Jersey.
173	St. Rose of Lima Roman Catholic Church Complex	St. Rose of Lima Roman Catholic Church Complex	February 21, 2017 (#100000658)	500 Parker Ave. 42°57′10″N 78°50′21″W	North Park	
174	St. Stephen's Roman Catholic Church Complex	St. Stephen's Roman Catholic Church Complex	July 27, 2018 (#100002738)	169–193 Elk St. 42°52′07″N 78°50′50″W	The Valley	1882 Late Victorian Gothic church and school were social center for several generations of Irish immigrants to Buffalo
175	St. Teresa's Roman Catholic Church Complex	St. Teresa's Roman Catholic Church Complex	September 6, 2016 (#16000589)	1970 Seneca St., 17 Mineral Springs Rd. 42°51′28″N 78°48′53″W	South Buffalo	Well-preserved collection of late 19th-century church buildings.
176	St. Thomas Aquinas Roman Catholic Church Complex	St. Thomas Aquinas Roman Catholic Church Complex	February 21, 2017 (#100000659)	432 Abbott Rd. 42°51′02″N 78°48′56″W	South Buffalo	
177	Smith-Henry Building		January 23, 2026 (#100012610)	41 West Tupper Street; 42°53′37″N 78°52′25″W		
178	South Presbyterian Church		May 18, 2026 (#100013006)	1782 Seneca Street. 42°51′41″N 78°49′03″W		
179	South Side Bank of Buffalo	South Side Bank of Buffalo	October 5, 2021 (#100005463)	2221 Seneca St. 42°51′09″N 78°48′23″W	South Buffalo	
180	Spencer Kellogg & Sons Elevator		November 15, 2024 (#100010984)	395 Ganson Street; 42°52′15″N 78°52′28″W		
181	Stone Farmhouse	Stone Farmhouse	February 1, 1999 (#98001614)	60 Hedley Pl. 42°55′24″N 78°51′05″W	Hamlin Park	Greek Revival influenced stone vernacular farmhouse built about 1830-1850
182	Taylor Signal Company-General Railway Signal Company	Taylor Signal Company-General Railway Signal Company	May 27, 2014 (#14000260)	1738 Elmwood Ave. 42°56′41″N 78°52′42″W	West Hertel	
183	Temple Beth Zion	Temple Beth Zion	January 16, 2018 (#100001965)	805 Delaware Ave. 42°54′23″N 78°52′18″W	Delaware District	
184	Tishman Building	Tishman Building	February 14, 2012 (#12000012)	447 Main St., 10 Lafayette Sq. 42°53′09″N 78°52′26″W	Downtown	
185	Trico Plant No. 1	Trico Plant No. 1	February 2, 2001 (#01000053)	817 Washington St. 42°53′42″N 78°52′10″W	Medical Corridor	Early and significant example of the "Daylight Factory"; former home to first manufacturer of windshield wipers
186	Trinity Episcopal Church	Trinity Episcopal Church	February 28, 2009 (#08000100)	371 Delaware Ave. 42°53′41″N 78°52′29″W	Allentown	Main church constructed in 1884–1886 and features stained glass windows designed by John LaFarge and Tiffany studios
187	Turner Brothers' Building–American Household Storage Company	Turner Brothers' Building–American Household Storage Company	January 9, 2013 (#12001128)	295 Niagara St. 42°53′34″N 78°53′01″W	Lower West Side	
188	University Heights-Summit Park-Berkshire Terrace Historic District	University Heights-Summit Park-Berkshire Terrace Historic District	August 17, 2020 (#100005458)	Portions of East Amherst St., Northrup Pl., Berkshire, Comstock, Cordova, Dartmouth, Dunlop, Hewett, Highgate, LaSalle, Lisbon, Minnesota, Parkridge, Shirley, Stockbridge and Winspear Aves. 42°56′41″N 78°49′02″W	Kensington-Bailey	
189	University Presbyterian Church	University Presbyterian Church	November 24, 2015 (#15000820)	3330 Main St. 42°57′17″N 78°49′29″W	University Heights	Unusual V-shaped church built in two phases was one of first to reach out to growing suburbs
190	U.S. Post Office	U.S. Post Office	March 16, 1972 (#72000839)	121 Ellicott St. 42°52′53″N 78°52′22″W	Downtown	Former post office built 1897–1901; home to city campus of Erie Community College
191	USS CROAKER (submarine)	USS CROAKER (submarine)	September 12, 2008 (#08000863)	1 Naval Park Cove; 42°52′41″N 78°52′54″W	Downtown	Gato class submarine, launched in 1943
192	USS THE SULLIVANS (destroyer)	USS THE SULLIVANS (destroyer)	January 14, 1986 (#86000085)	1 Naval Park Cove; 42°52′40″N 78°52′50″W	Downtown	Fletcher class destroyer, launched in 1943
193	University Park Historic District	University Park Historic District	May 11, 2011 (#11000273)	Portions of Larchmont Rd., Niagara Falls Blvd., Radcliffe Rd., University Ave., Allenhurst Rd., Pellhan Dr; 42°57′24″N 78°49′30″W	University Heights	
194	The Virginia	The Virginia	June 12, 2017 (#100001067)	250 Virginia St. 42°53′41″N 78°52′56″W	Lower West Side	Intact 1900 apartment building designed for young middle-class tenants
195	Visco Meter Factory-Buerk Tool Factory	Visco Meter Factory-Buerk Tool Factory	May 9, 2022 (#100007689)	293 Grote St. 42°56′32″N 78°52′49″W	Black Rock	
196	West Village Historic District	West Village Historic District	May 6, 1980 (#80002610)	Roughly bounded by S. Elmwood Ave., Chippewa, Georgia, Prospect, Carolina and Tracy Sts. 42°53′31″N 78°52′50″W	Lower West Side	District with 102 structures built between 1854 and 1914, most of which are detached single-family dwellings, with about a dozen apartment buildings
197	The Wayne and The Waldorf Apartments	The Wayne and The Waldorf Apartments	November 12, 2014 (#14000912)	1106 Main St. 42°54′20″N 78°52′31″W	Delaware District	Only remaining apartments meant for middle-class residents from city's early 20th-century expansion
198	Westminster House Club House	Westminster House Club House	May 25, 2018 (#100002512)	419 Monroe St. 42°53′30″N 78°51′06″W	Broadway-Fillmore	1909 brick structure is one of few left in the city built by the Settlement movement
199	M. Wile and Company Factory Building	M. Wile and Company Factory Building	November 22, 2000 (#00001419)	77 Goodell St. 42°53′40″N 78°52′07″W	Medical Corridor	Early example of the "Daylight Factory" built in 1924
200	Winspear Extension Historic District		February 2, 2024 (#100009880)	393-638 Highgate Avenue; 16-258 Rounds Avenue (north side only); 361-605 B street & number and 412-604 Winspear Avenue; Orleans Street and Suffolk Street between Winspear Avenue and Rounds Avenue; 42°56′56″N 78°48′28″W	Kensington-Bailey	
201	Wollenberg Grain and Seed Elevator	Wollenberg Grain and Seed Elevator	May 19, 2003 (#03000409)	131 Goodyear Ave. 42°53′59″N 78°49′18″W	Broadway-Fillmore	"Country style" grain elevator built in 1912 and destroyed by fire in 2006
202	Woodlawn Avenue Row	Woodlawn Avenue Row	March 19, 1986 (#86000690)	75-81 Woodlawn Ave. 42°54′49″N 78°51′44″W	Cold Spring	Speculative frame rowhouses built in 1898
203	Young Men's Christian Association Central Building	Young Men's Christian Association Central Building	September 8, 1983 (#83001676)	45 W. Mohawk St. 42°53′15″N 78°52′33″W	Downtown	Constructed in 1901–1902 and home to the third oldest YMCA chapter in North America until converted to office use in the early 1980s
204	Ziegele-Phoenix Refrigeration House and Office	Ziegele-Phoenix Refrigeration House and Office	January 17, 2018 (#100001966)	835 Washington St. 42°53′48″N 78°52′11″W	Medical Corridor	
205	The Zink Block	The Zink Block	December 7, 2010 (#10000987)	346 Connecticut St. 42°54′21″N 78°53′17″W	Lower West Side	

== Former listings ==
	Name on the Register	Image	Date listed	Date removed	Location	Neighborhood	Description
1	17-21 Emerson Place Row		March 19, 1986 (#86000689)	May 20, 1988	17-21 Emerson Place; 42°54′47″N 78°51′38″W	Cold Spring	Demolished on October 27, 1987.
2	Niagara Frontier Transit Buildings		May 14, 1980 (#80002609)	October 5, 1981	855 Main St. 42°53′50″N 78°52′13″W	Medical Corridor	Destroyed by fire on April 8, 1981.

== See also ==
- National Register of Historic Places listings in New York
- List of National Historic Landmarks in New York
- List of City of Buffalo landmarks and historic districts
