= Lower West Side =

Lower West Side may refer to the following neighborhoods:

- Lower West Side, Chicago
- Lower West Side, Buffalo New York
- Lower West Side, Manhattan

== See also ==
- Lower East Side
- Upper West Side
