= Upper West =

Upper West may refer to:

== Places ==
- Upper West Province, Western Australia
- Upper West Pubnico, Nova Scotia, Canada
- Upper West Region, in Ghana
- Upper West Side, New York City
- Upper West Side, Buffalo, New York, United States

== Other ==
- Success Academy Upper West, part of Success Academy Charter Schools
- Upper West Side Story, TV show
- Upper West Akim, parliamentary constituency in West Akim District of Eastern Region of Ghana
