= The Karnak Flats =

- U.S. National Register of Historic Places
- New York State Register of Historic Places
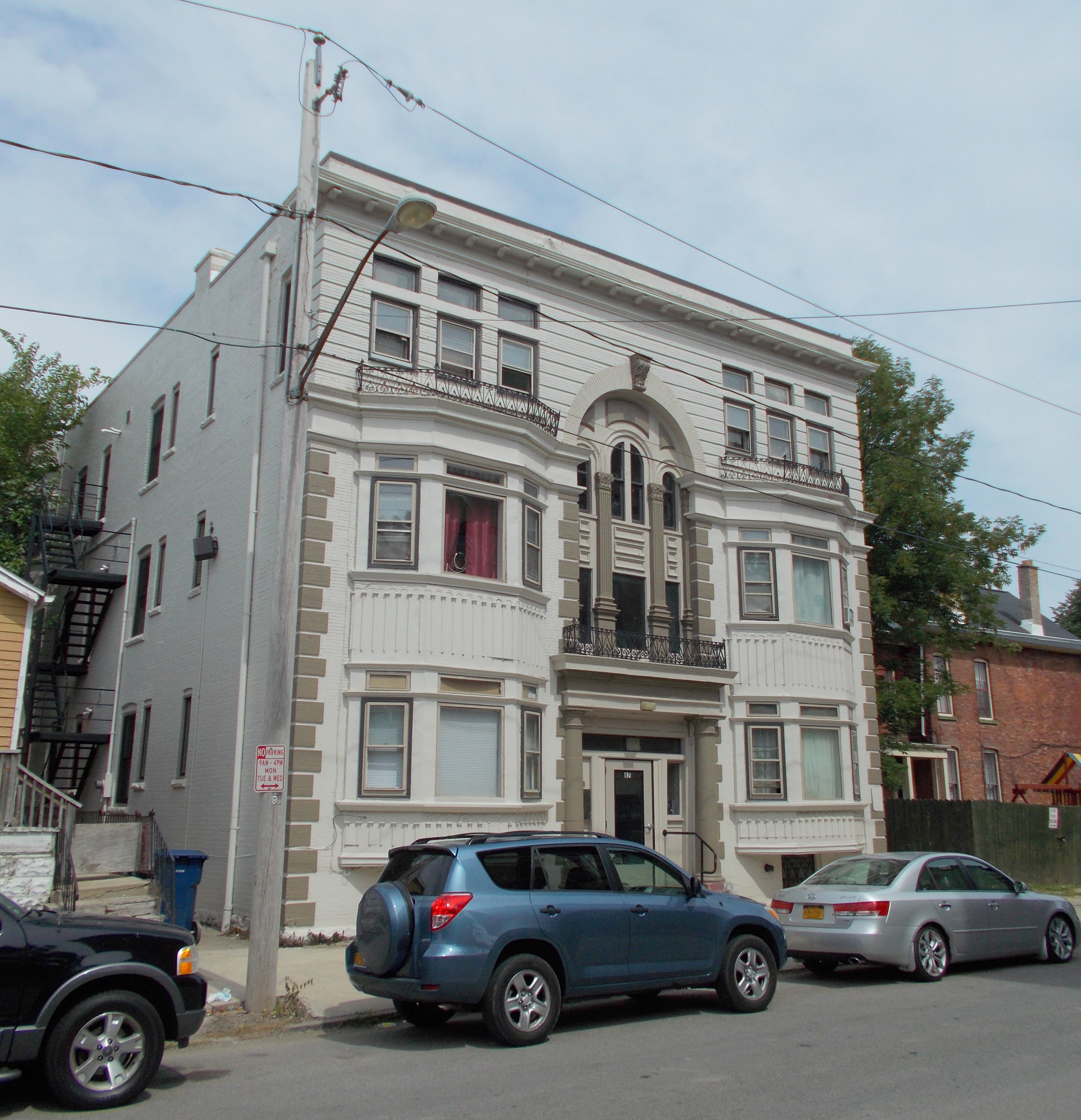
- The Karnak Flats, July 2016

- Location within New York Location within the United States
- Location: 87 Whitney Place, Buffalo, New York
- Coordinates: 42°53′36″N 78°52′53″W
- Area: .12 acres (0.049 ha)
- Built: c. 1898
- Architectural style: Colonial Revival
- NRHP reference No.: 16000841
- NYSRHP No.: 02940.000326

Significant dates
- Added to NRHP: December 13, 2016
- Designated NYSRHP: October 7, 2016

The Karnak Flats is a historic apartment building located in the Lower West Side neighborhood of Buffalo, Erie County, New York, United States. It was built about 1898, and is a three-story, three-bay, Colonial Revival style brick building. It sits on a stone foundation and full basement. The building has four apartments per floor, for a total of twelve in the building. The front facade features a metal balconette above the central recessed entrance and a two-story tripartite Palladian window with fluted Corinthian pilaster mullions.

It was listed on the National Register of Historic Places in 2016.
