= The Virginia (Buffalo, New York) =

- U.S. National Register of Historic Places
- New York State Register of Historic Places
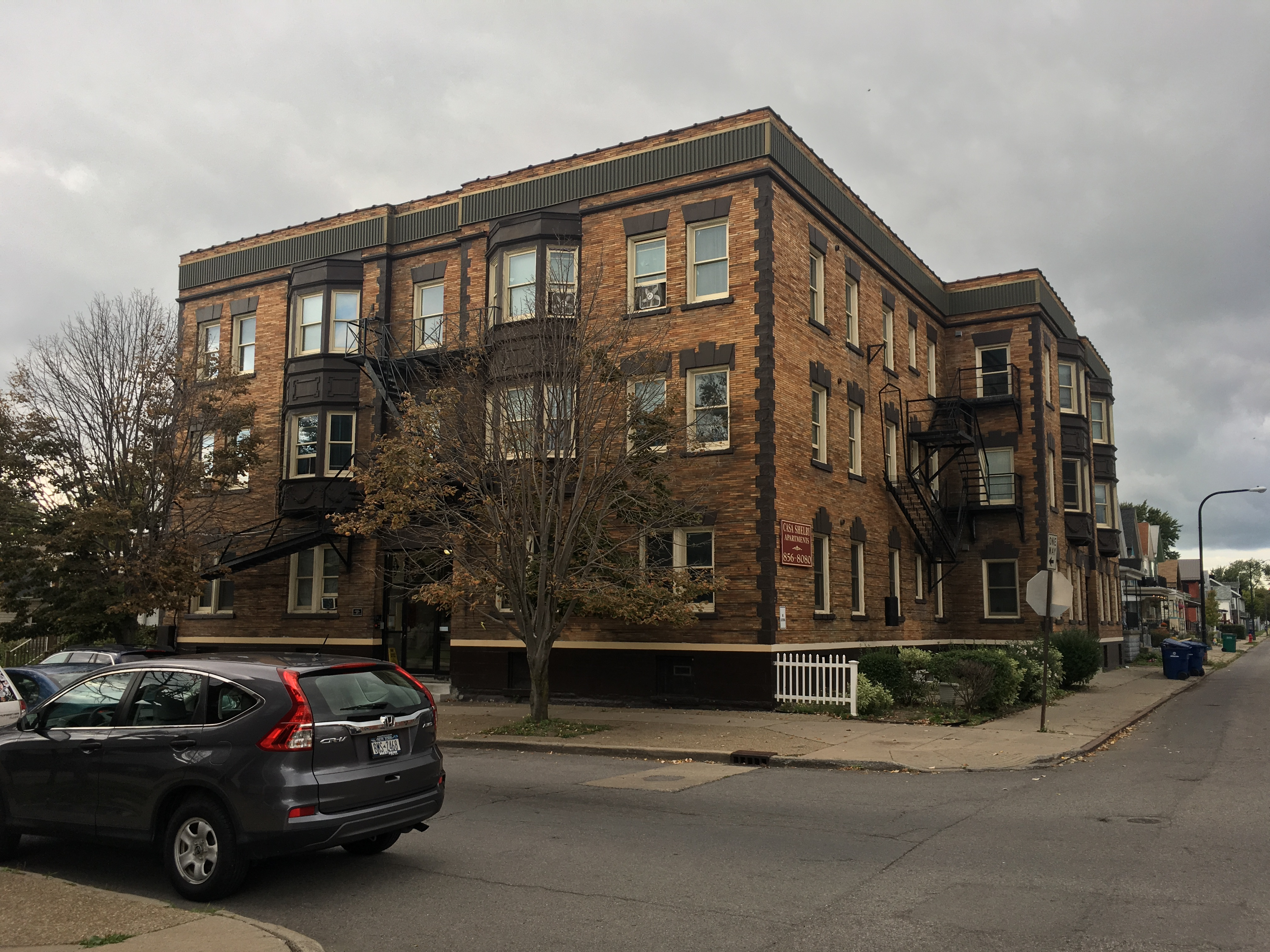
- The Virginia, September 2019

- Location within New York Location within the United States
- Location: 250 Virginia Street, Buffalo, New York
- Coordinates: 42°53′41″N 78°52′56″W
- Area: .172 acres (0.070 ha)
- Built: c. 1900
- Architect: Henry Perram
- Architectural style: Colonial Revival
- NRHP reference No.: 100001067
- NYSRHP No.: 02940.003899

Significant dates
- Added to NRHP: June 12, 2017
- Designated NYSRHP: April 20, 2017

The Virginia, also known as the Casa Shelby Apartments, is a historic apartment building located in the Lower West Side neighborhood of Buffalo, New York, United States. It was built about 1900, and is a three-story, Colonial Revival style brick building. It sits on a stone foundation and full basement. The building houses 24 apartments and was originally designed for young middle-class tenants.

It was listed on the National Register of Historic Places in 2017.
