= Buffalo Milk Company Building =

- U.S. National Register of Historic Places
- New York State Register of Historic Places
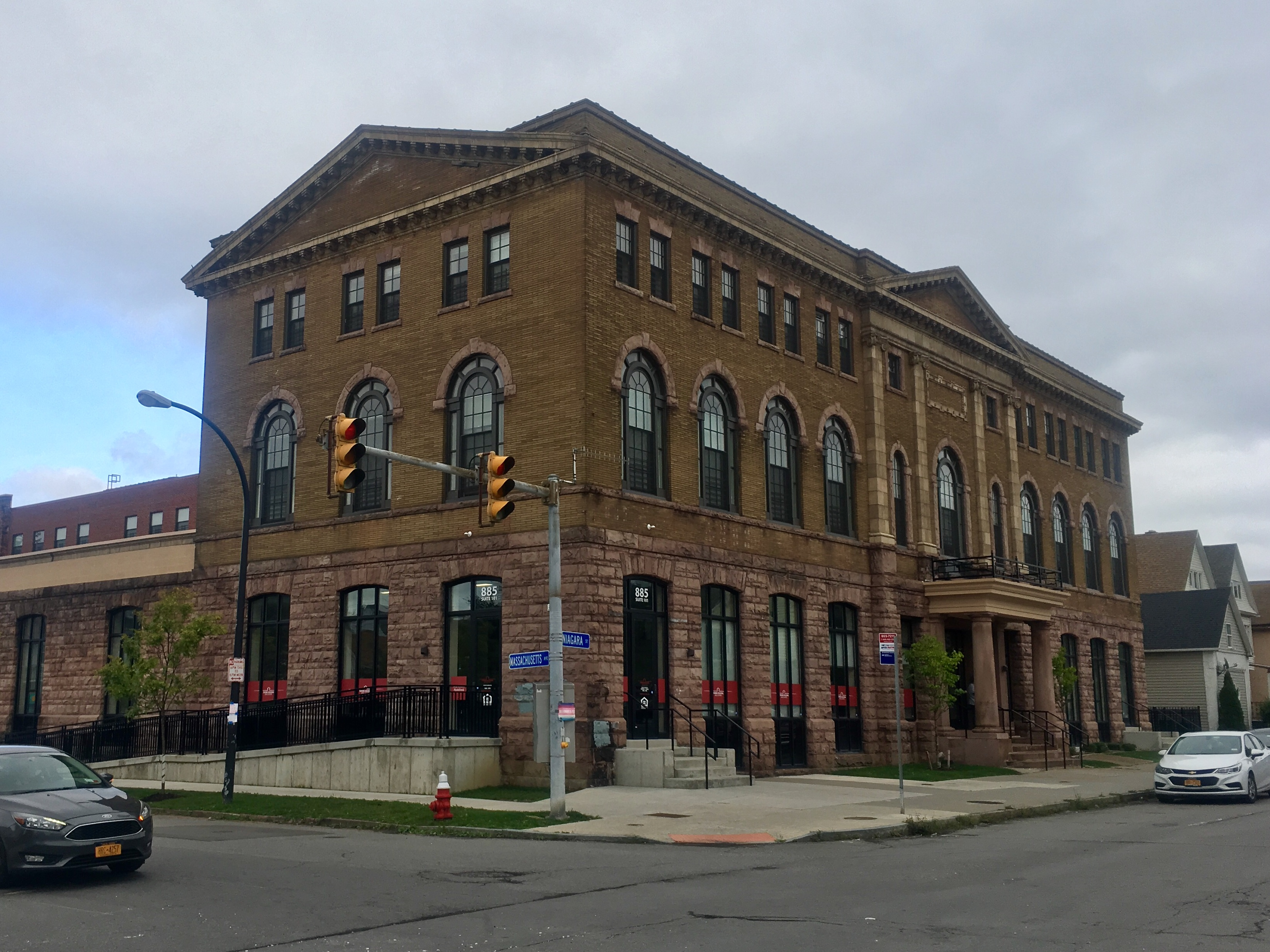
- Buffalo Milk Company Building, September 2019

- Location within New York Location within the United States
- Location: 885 Niagara St., Buffalo, New York
- Coordinates: 42°54′27″N 78°53′52″W
- Area: 0.806 acres (0.326 ha)
- Built: 1903-1905, 1910, 1914
- Architect: Sidney Woodruff (1903-1905)
- Architectural style: Renaissance Revival
- NRHP reference No.: 16000839
- NYSRHP No.: 02940.004578

Significant dates
- Added to NRHP: December 13, 2016
- Designated NYSRHP: October 20, 2016

Buffalo Milk Company Building, also known as the Queen City Dairy Company Building, is a historic dairy building located in Buffalo, New York, United States. The original section was built in 1903–1905, and is a three-story, L-shaped, brick and sandstone building in the Renaissance Revival style. Additions to the building were made in 1910 and 1911. The dairy was first in city to be used for large-scale for the pasteurization and distribution of milk. The building has been redeveloped as an apartment building known as the Niagara Gateway Apartments.

It was listed on the National Register of Historic Places in 2016.

== Gallery ==
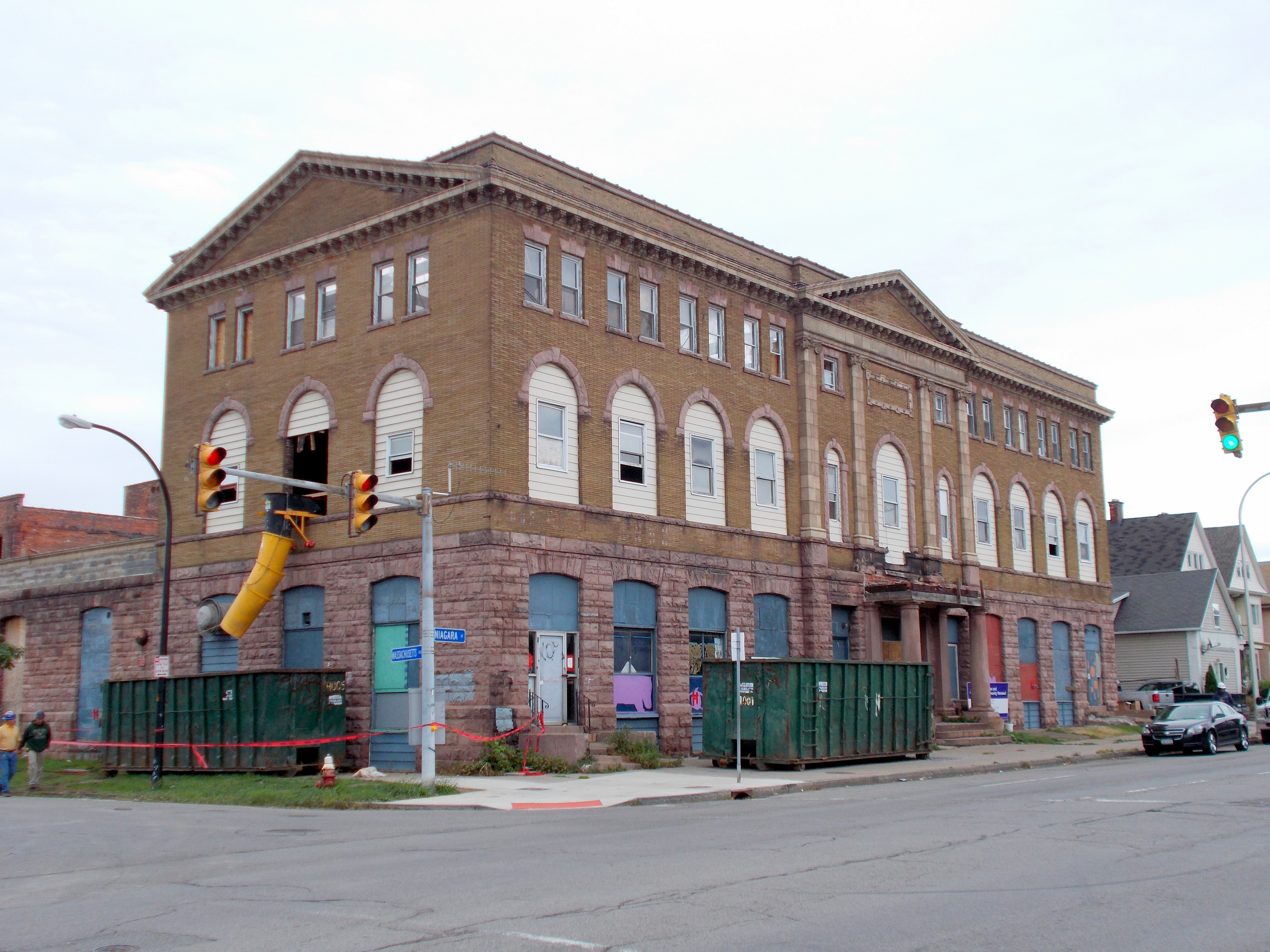
Buffalo Milk Co Building, September 2016
