= H. A. Meldrum Company Building =

Historic commercial building in New York, United States

- U.S. National Register of Historic Places
- New York State Register of Historic Places
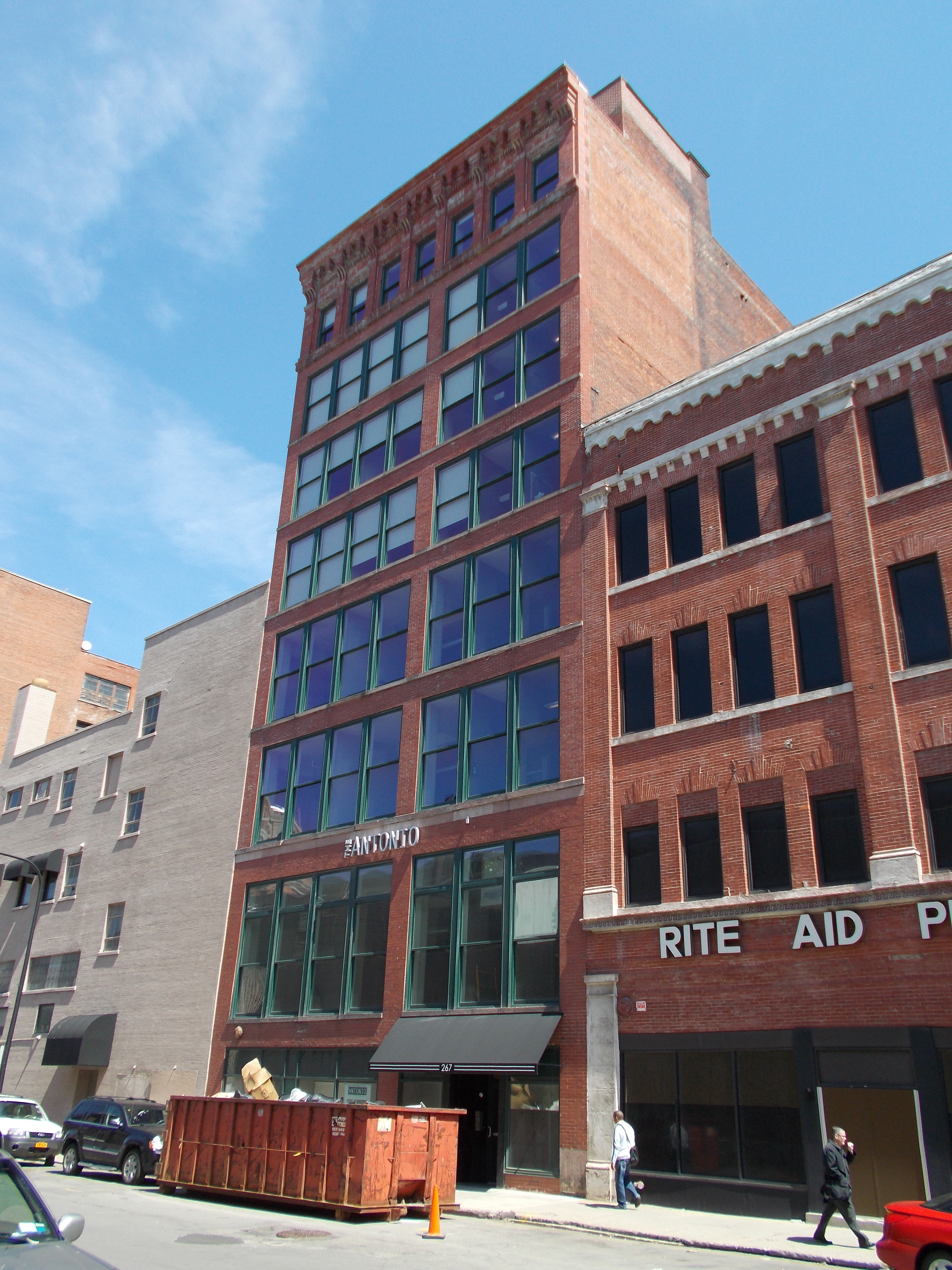
- H. A. Meldrum Company Building, April 2013

- Location within New York Location within the United States
- Location: 265–267 Pearl St., Buffalo, New York
- Coordinates: 42°53′11″N 78°52′31″W
- Area: 0.15 acres (0.061 ha)
- Built: c. 1909
- Architectural style: Reinforced concrete frame
- NRHP reference No.: 13000330
- NYSRHP No.: 02940.003004

Significant dates
- Added to NRHP: May 29, 2013
- Designated NYSRHP: April 1, 2013

H. A. Meldrum Company Building is a historic department store building located at Buffalo in Erie County, New York. It was built about 1909 and is an eight-story, reinforced concrete commercial building with brick veneer walls. It was built as an addition to the Meldrum department store located at 460-470 Main Street. The H. A. Meldrum Company operated from 1897 to 1922. Its founder, Herbert Alexander Meldrum (1870-1960), was the son of Alexander Meldrum one of the founders of AM&A's.

It was listed on the National Register of Historic Places in 2014.

== Gallery ==
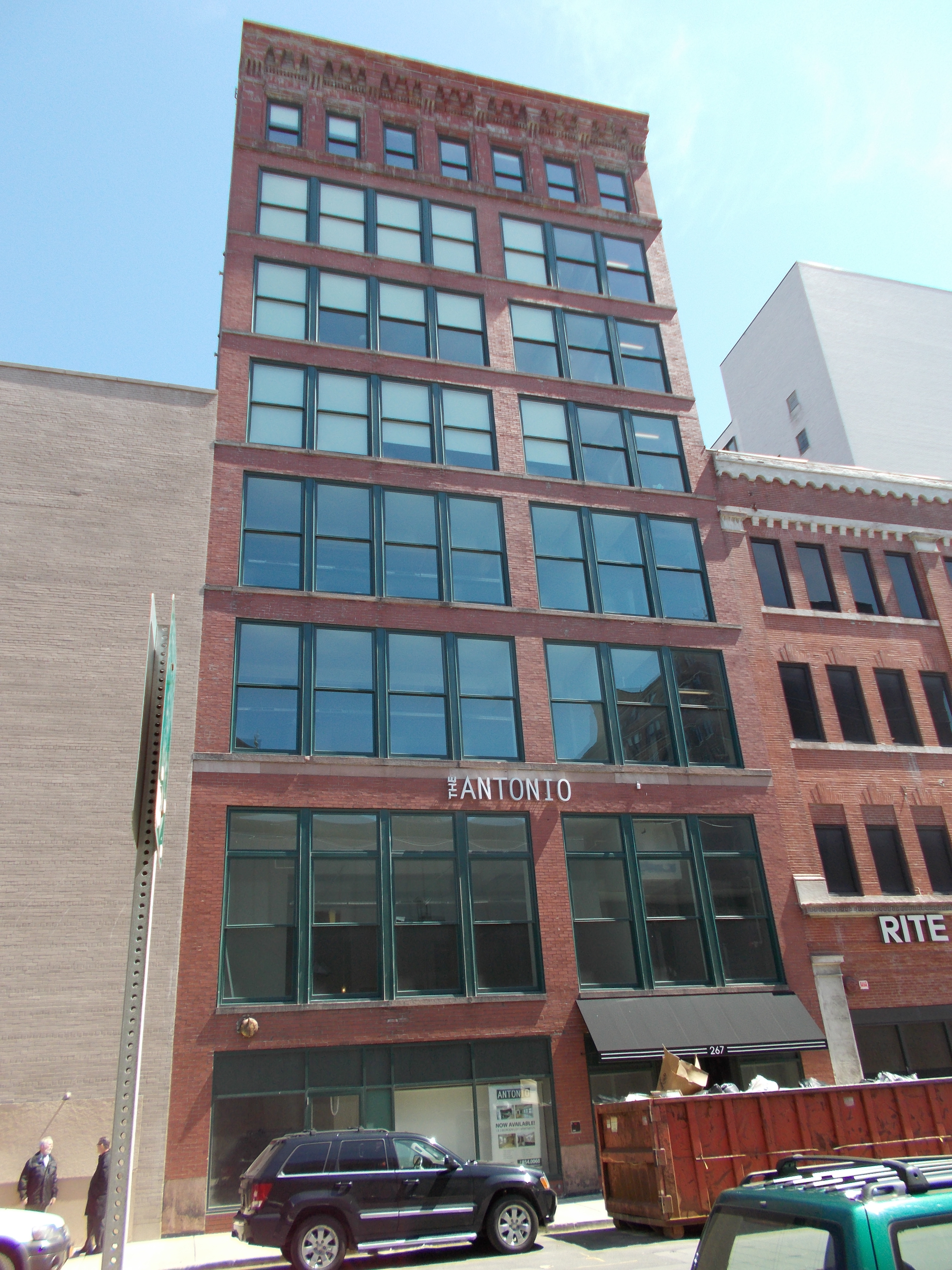
H.A. Meldrum & Company Building, Front View, Buffalo, NY, April 2013

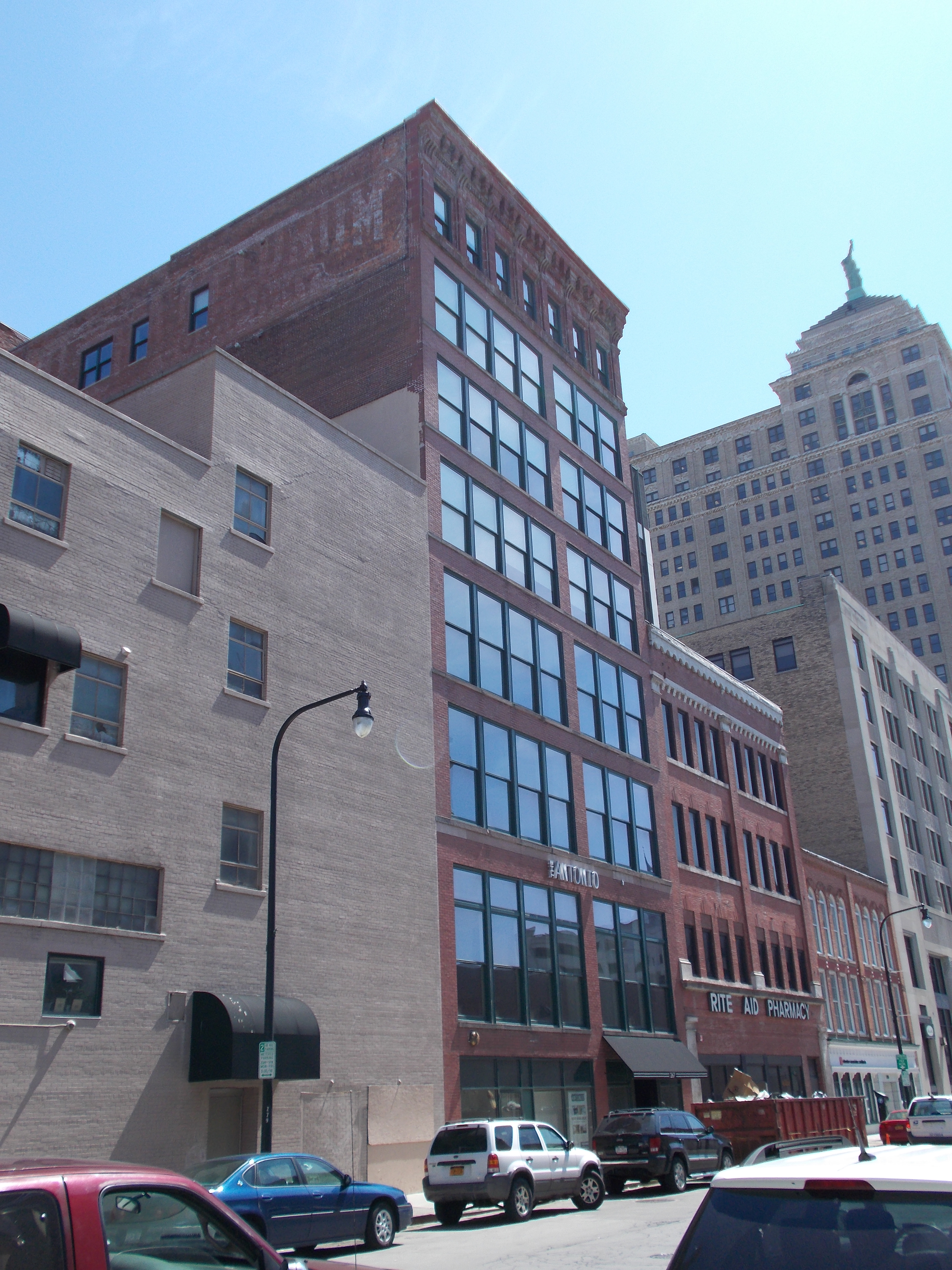
H.A. Meldrum & Company Building, North View, Buffalo, NY, April 2013
