= Parkside Candy Shoppe and Factory =

Historic commercial building in New York, United States

- U.S. National Register of Historic Places
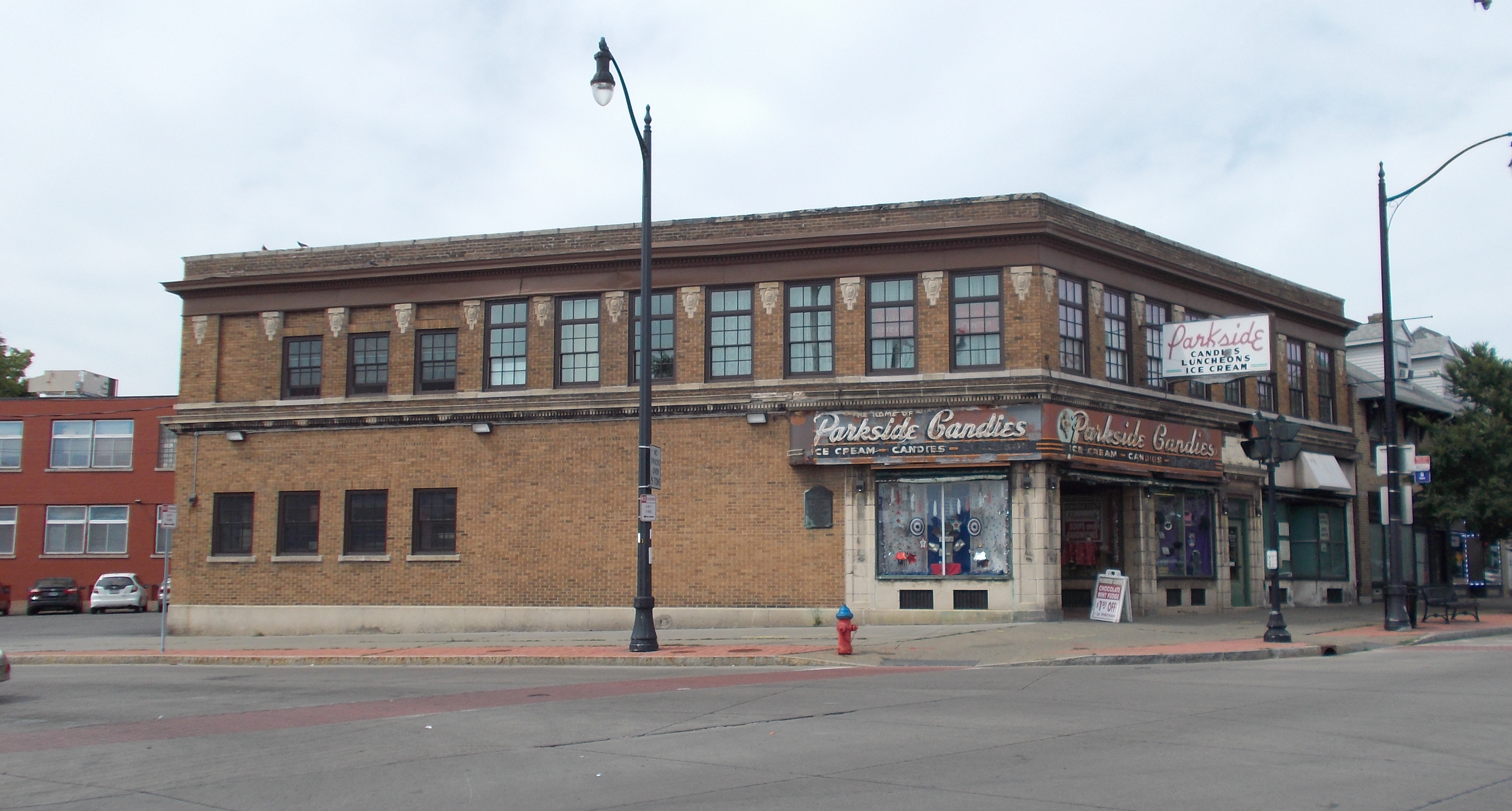
- Parkside Candy Shoppe and Factory, July 2016

- Location within New York Location within the United States
- Location: 3208 Main St., Buffalo, New York
- Coordinates: 42°57′06″N 78°49′41″W
- Area: 0.46 acres (0.19 ha)
- Built: 1925, 1927, 1928, c.1955
- Architect: G. Morton Wolfe
- Architectural style: Arts and Crafts, Adams Revival
- NRHP reference No.: 15000799
- Added to NRHP: November 16, 2015

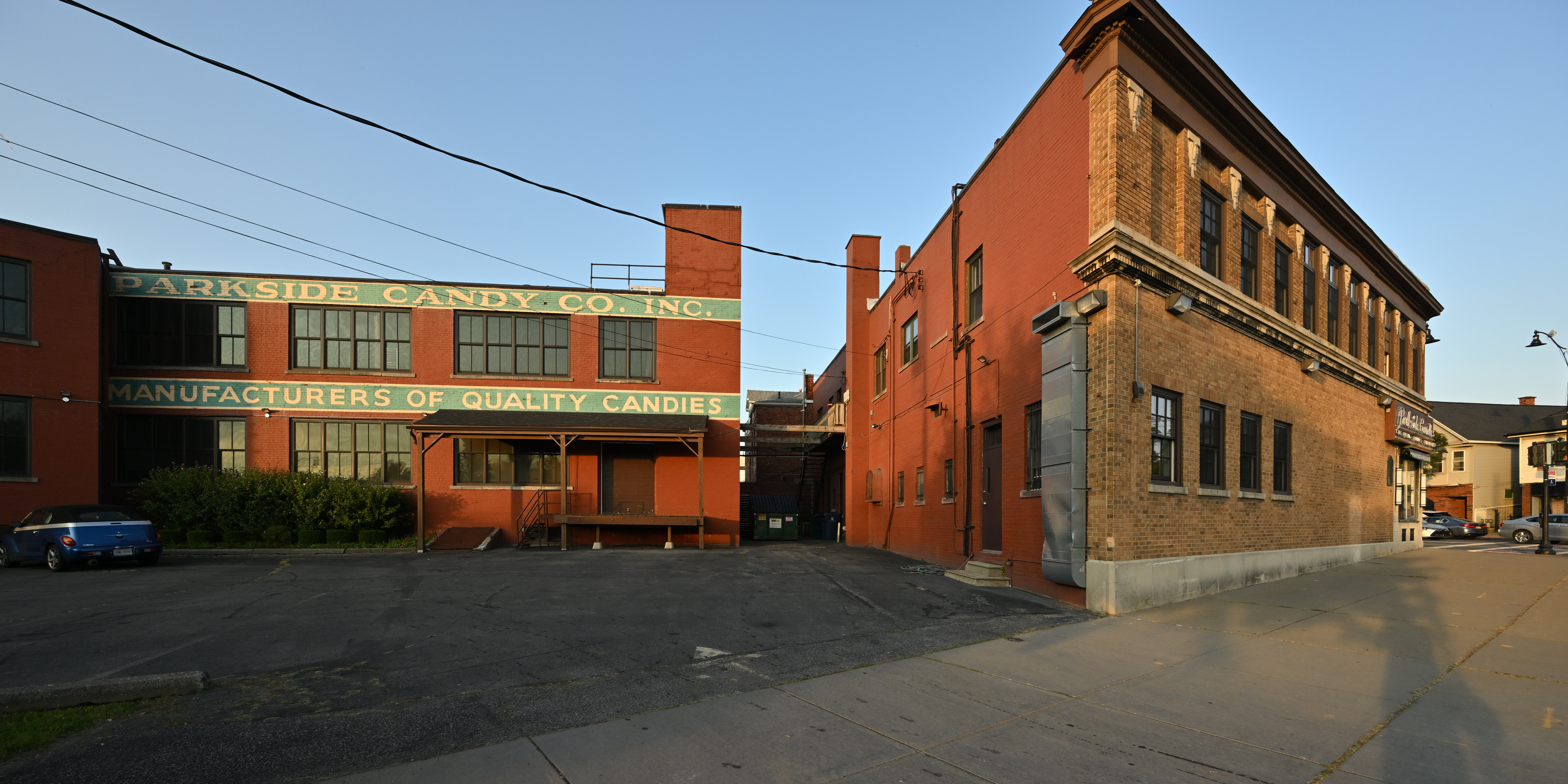
Parkside Candy Co factory, Buffalo, NY

Parkside Candy Shoppe and Factory is a historic commercial and industrial complex located in the University Heights neighborhood of Buffalo, Erie County, New York. It consists of a two-story brick and stone commercial Candy Shoppe building (1925–1927), with an attached two-story brick and tile daylight factory building, erected in two stages (1925–1927; 1928). Also on the property is a contributing one-story, three-bay frame garage (1928).

It was listed on the National Register of Historic Places in 2015.
