= The Zink Block =

Historic commercial building in New York, United States

- U.S. National Register of Historic Places
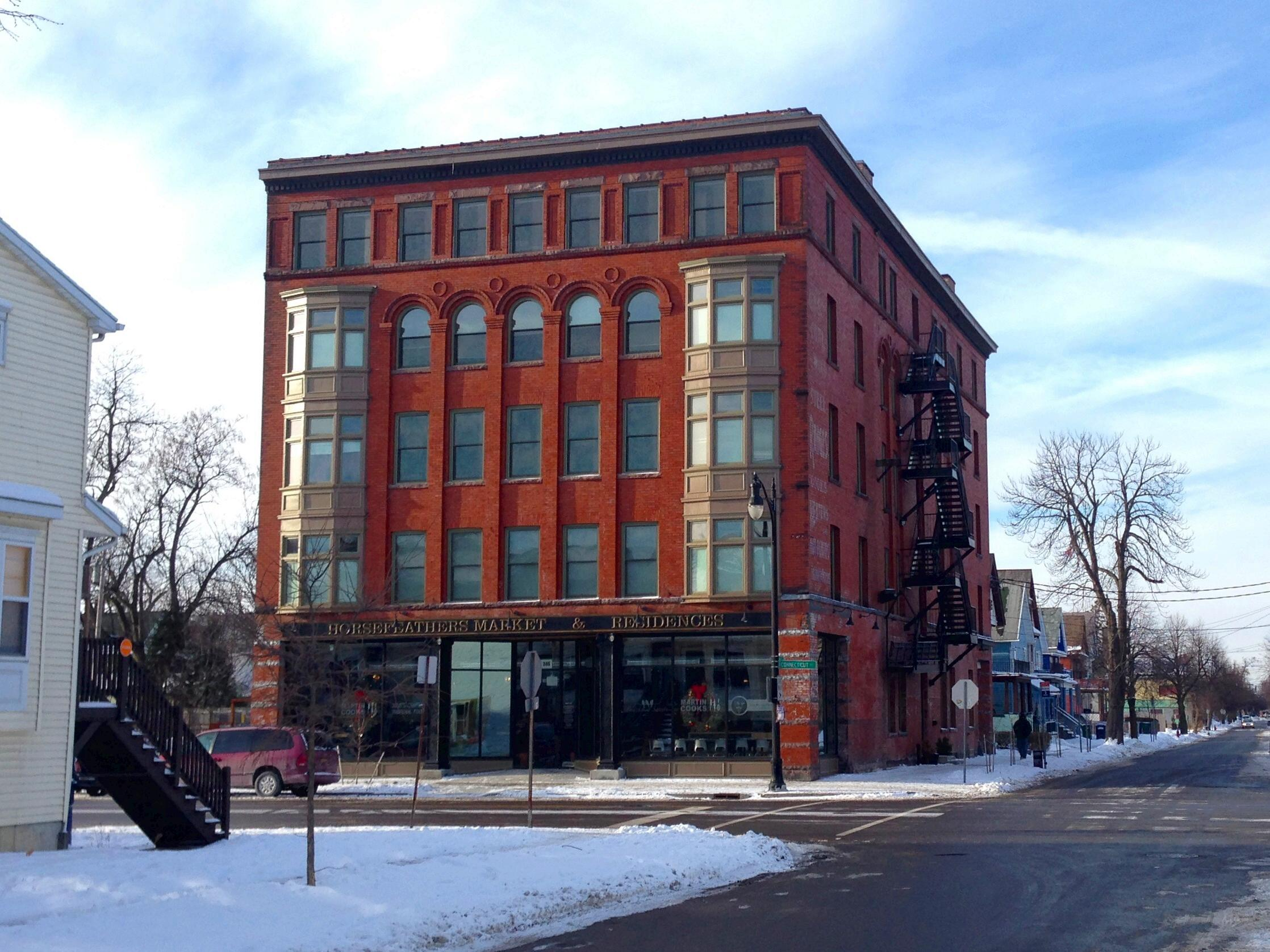
- The Zink Block, January 2014

- Location within New York Location within the United States
- Location: 346 Connecticut St., Buffalo, New York
- Coordinates: 42°54′21″N 78°53′17″W
- Area: under 1 acre
- Built: 1896
- Architect: Swan, Charles Day
- Architectural style: Italian Renaissance
- NRHP reference No.: 10000987
- Added to NRHP: December 7, 2010

The Zink Block is a historic commercial building located in Buffalo, in Erie County, New York. It was built in 1896 for William T. Zink for his furniture sales and repair store. It is a five-story, brick building with a flat roof and Italian Renaissance Revival detailing. It sits on a stone foundation. The seven-bay front facade features two stacked tripartite bay window units on the second through fourth floors.

It was listed on the National Register of Historic Places in 2010.

== Gallery ==
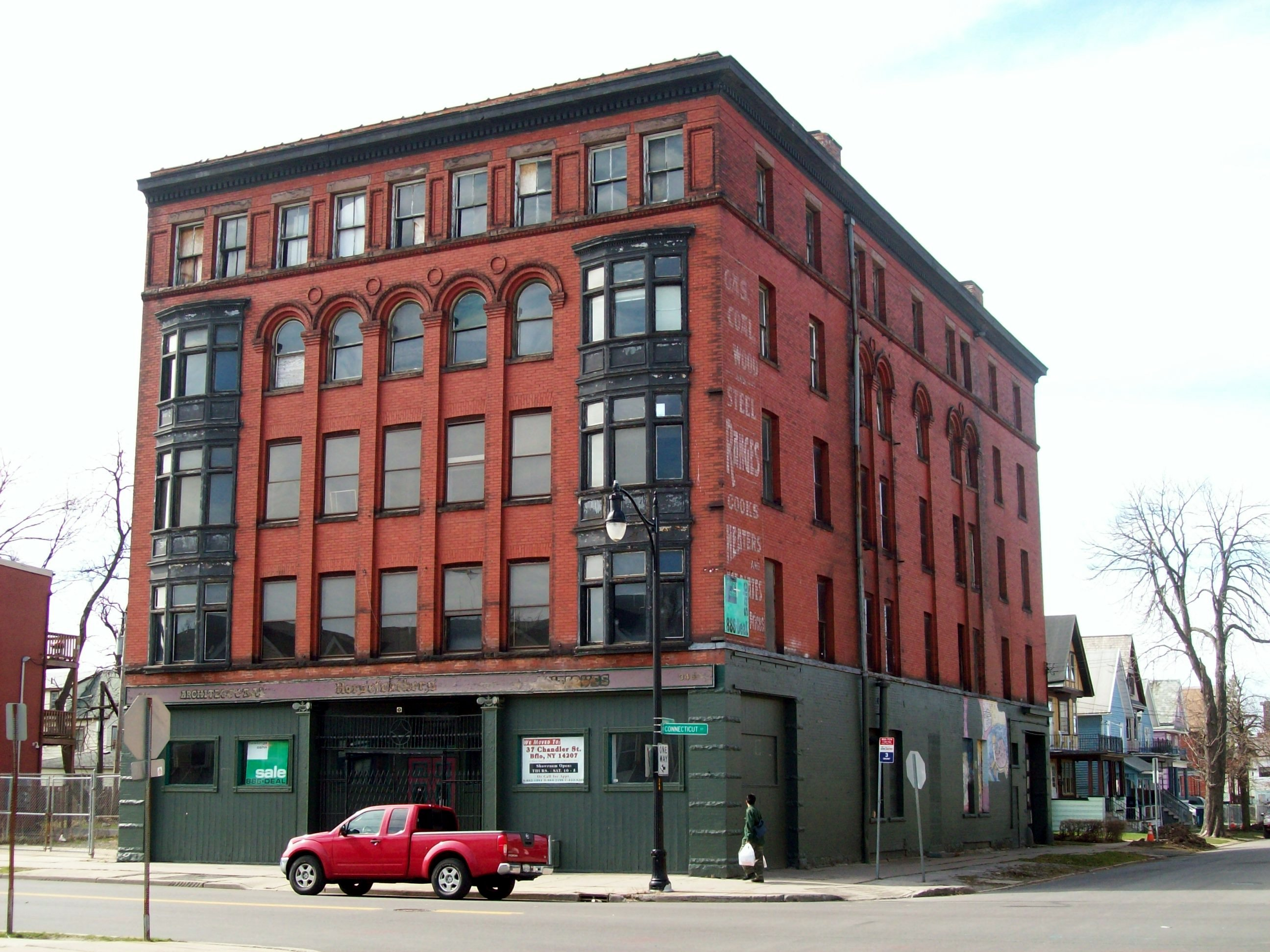
The Zink Block, April 2011
