= Robertson–Cataract Electric Building =

Historic commercial building in New York, United States

- U.S. National Register of Historic Places
- New York State Register of Historic Places
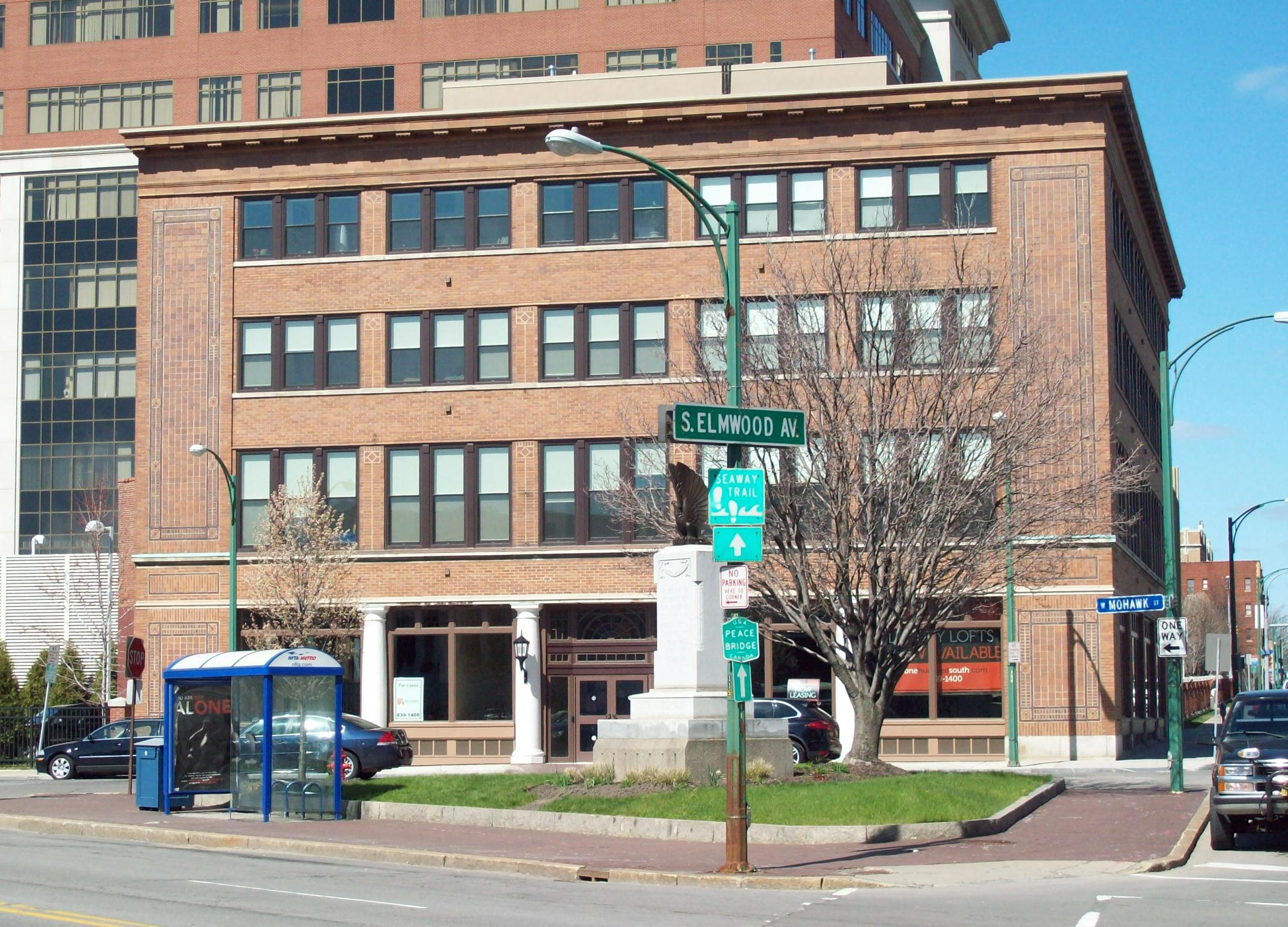
- Robertson–Cataract Electric Building, April 2012

- Location within New York Location within the United States
- Location: 100, 126 S. Elmwood, Buffalo, New York
- Coordinates: 42°53′18″N 78°52′46″W
- Area: under one acre
- Built: 1915-1916, 1919
- Built by: Turner Construction
- Architects: Wood and Bradney
- Architectural style: Renaissance Revival
- NRHP reference No.: 12000011
- NYSRHP No.: 02940.000293

Significant dates
- Added to NRHP: February 8, 2012
- Designated NYSRHP: December 19, 2011

Robertson–Cataract Electric Building, also known as The Corn Exchange and 100 South, is a historic commercial building located in downtown Buffalo in Erie County, New York. It was built in 1915–1916, and is a four-story, five-bay, reinforced concrete building faced in brick in the Renaissance Revival-style. The building was expanded in 1919. It features terra cotta and polychromatic brick details in hues of red, brown, and purple. It originally housed a retail showroom and warehouse space for the Robertson–Cataract Electric Co.

In July 2012, global engineering firm T. Y. Lin International announced it would lease 6,500 square feet in the building.

It was listed on the National Register of Historic Places in 2012.
