= House at 218 Dearborn Street =

Historic house in New York, United States

- U.S. National Register of Historic Places
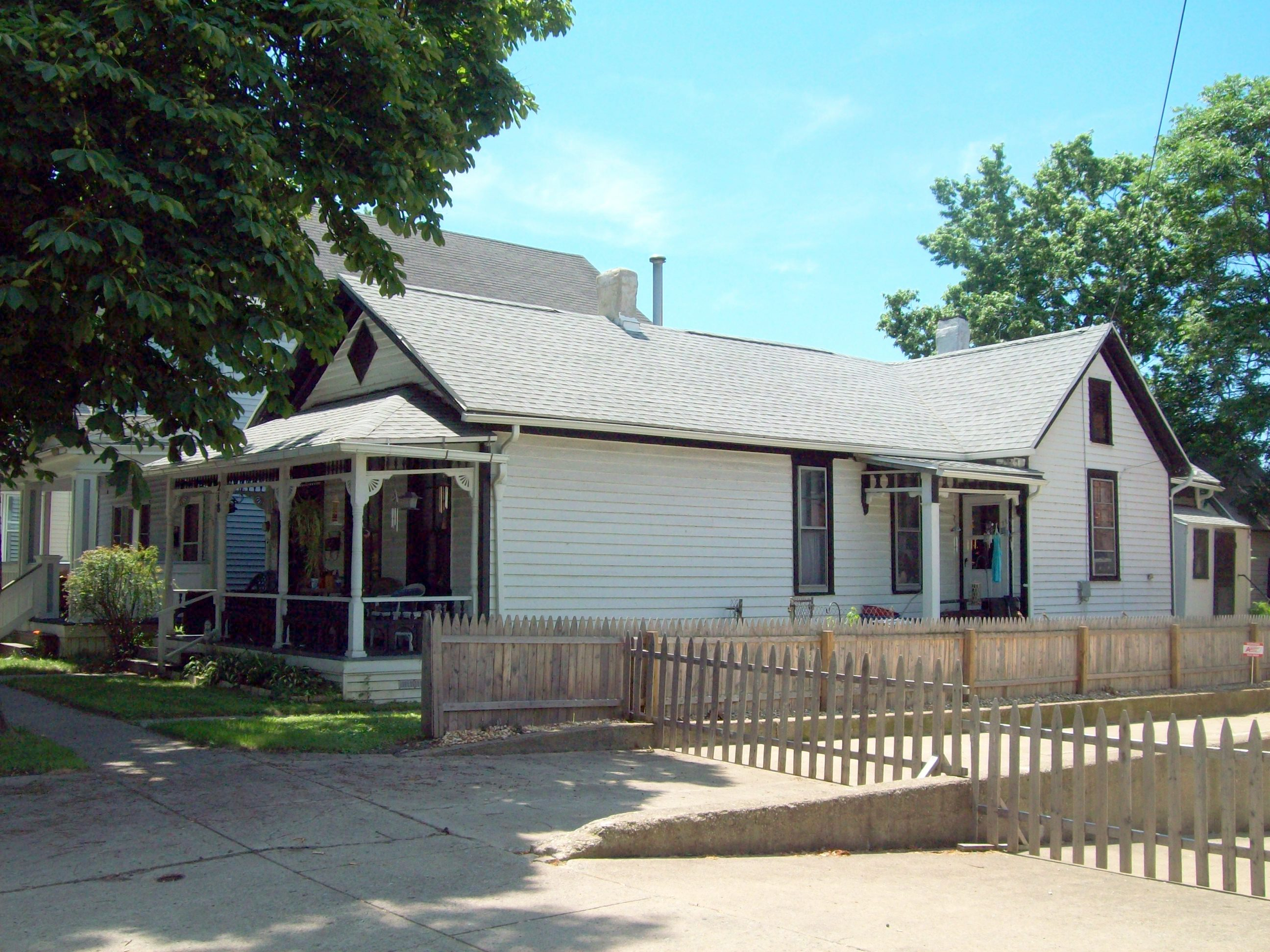
- House at 218 Dearborn Street, July 2011

- Location within New York Location within the United States
- Location: 218 Dearborn Street, Buffalo, New York
- Coordinates: 42°56′07″N 78°54′07″W
- Area: under one acre
- Built: c. 1880
- MPS: Historic Resources of the Black Rock Planning Neighborhood MPS
- NRHP reference No.: 11000741
- Added to NRHP: October 18, 2011

House at 218 Dearborn Street is a historic home located in the Black Rock neighborhood of Buffalo in Erie County, New York. It was built about 1880, and is a one-story, wood-frame shotgun-style workers cottage on a limestone foundation. It is three bays wide and has a low pitched gable roof. It features a hipped roof front porch with decorative spandrels, added about 1890. Also on the property is a shed dated to about 1890.

It was listed on the National Register of Historic Places in 2011.
