= Westminster House Club House =

- U.S. National Register of Historic Places
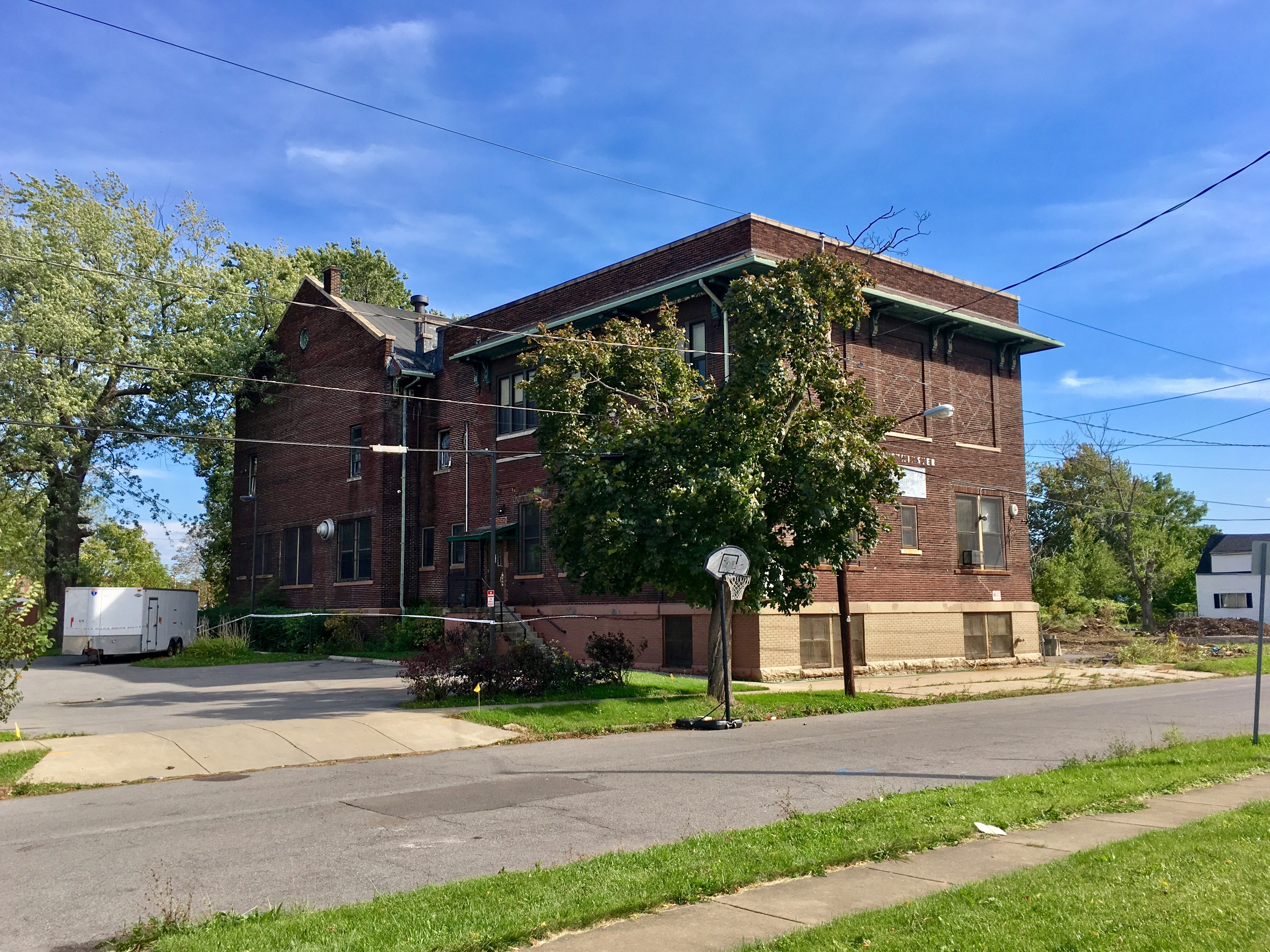
- Westminster House Club House, September 2019

- Location within New York Location within the United States
- Location: 419 Monroe St., Buffalo, New York
- Coordinates: 42°53′30″N 78°51′06″W
- Area: 0.25 acres (0.10 ha)
- Built: 1909
- Architectural style: Craftsman
- NRHP reference No.: 100002512
- Added to NRHP: May 25, 2018

Westminster House Club House is a historic settlement house clubhouse located in the Broadway-Fillmore neighborhood of Buffalo, New York, United States. It was built in 1909–1910, and is a two-story, L-shaped, red brick building with Craftsman style design elements. It features broad overhanging eaves with paired brackets and a raised basement. The building is the last of a complex of buildings operated by Westminster Presbyterian Church that housed social welfare activities that largely benefited the German immigrant community on Buffalo's East Side in the early 20th century.

It was listed on the National Register of Historic Places in 2018.
