= Turner Brothers' Building–American Household Storage Company =

- U.S. National Register of Historic Places
- New York State Register of Historic Places
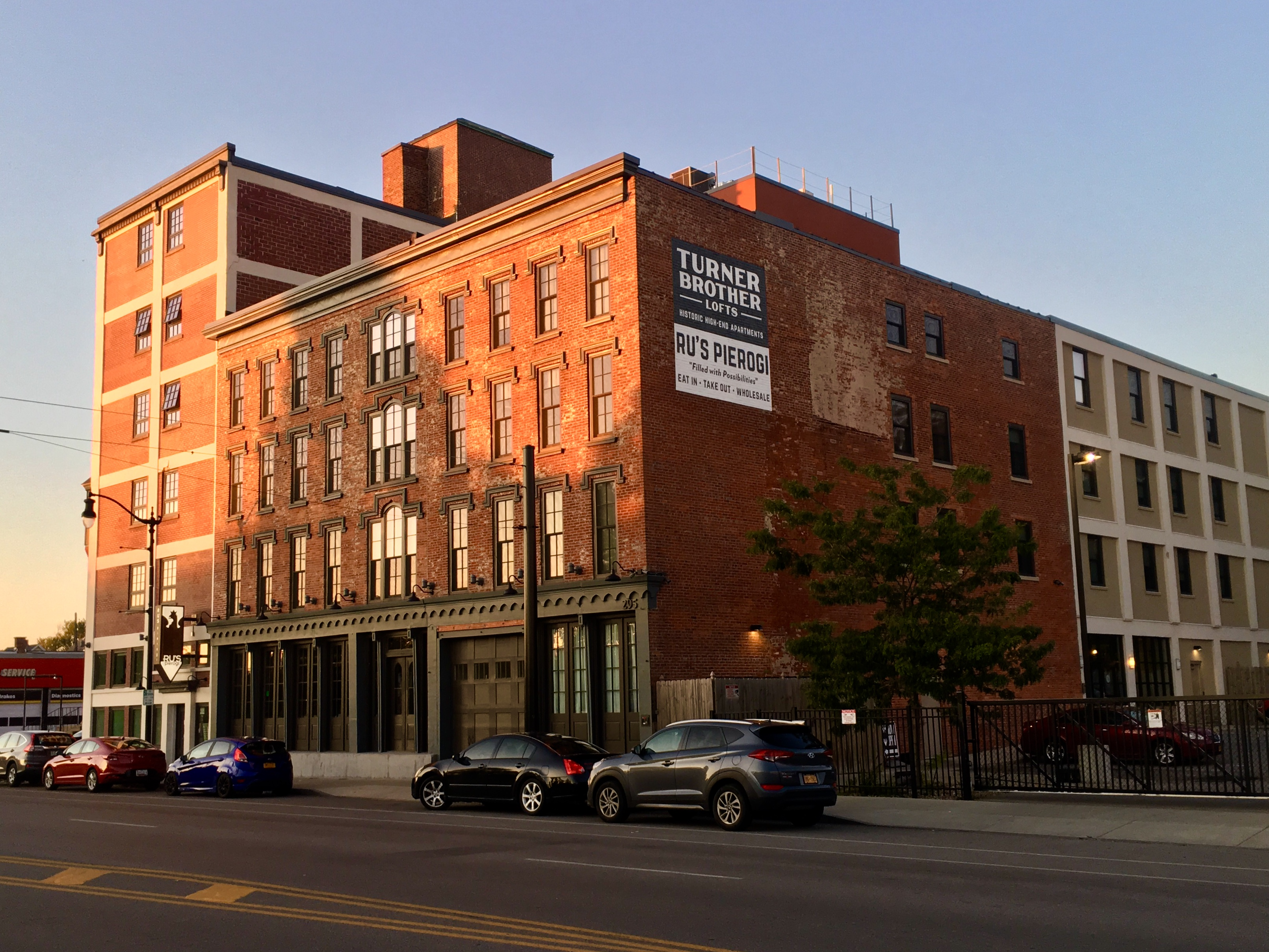
- Turner Brothers' Building–American Household Storage Company, September 2019

- Location within New York Location within the United States
- Location: 295 Niagara St., Buffalo, New York
- Coordinates: 42°53′34″N 78°53′01″W
- Area: 0.43 acres (0.17 ha)
- NRHP reference No.: 12001128
- NYSRHP No.: 02940.000301, 02940.000302

Significant dates
- Added to NRHP: January 9, 2013
- Designated NYSRHP: November 5, 2012

Turner Brothers' Building–American Household Storage Company is a historic manufacturing and warehouse building located at Buffalo in Erie County, New York. The original section was built about 1848, and it is a four-story, wood frame, brick faced building in the Gothic Revival style. A six-story, two bay reinforced concrete addition was built in 1910. The building has three-story rear additions built in 1889 and 1940.

It was listed on the National Register of Historic Places in 2013.
