= E. & B. Holmes Machinery Company Building =

- U.S. National Register of Historic Places
- New York State Register of Historic Places
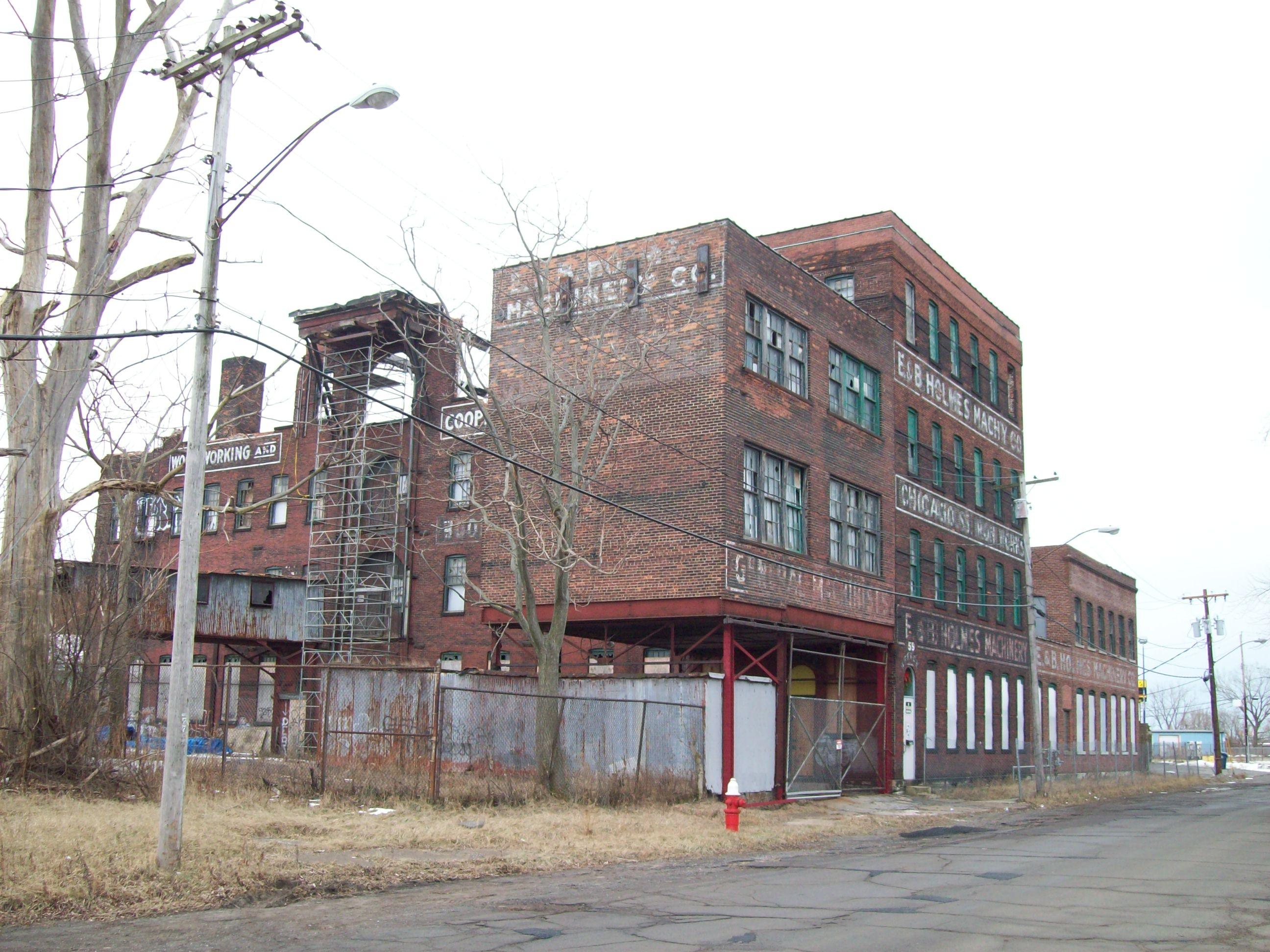
- E. & B. Holmes Machinery Company Building, December 2009

- Location within New York Location within the United States
- Location: 55-59 Chicago St., Buffalo, New York
- Coordinates: 42°52′11.27″N 78°52′7.72″W
- Area: 0.67 acres (0.27 ha)
- Built: 1870
- NRHP reference No.: 09000376
- NYSRHP No.: 02940.000078

Significant dates
- Added to NRHP: June 2, 2009
- Designated NYSRHP: April 6, 2009

E. & B. Holmes Machinery Company Building, also known as The Cooperage, is a historic factory building located at Buffalo in Erie County, New York. It is a roughly rectangular brick building composed of three primary sections of four-, three-, and two-stories, which encircle a central courtyard. The three sections are the Mill Building (ca. 1870), Forge Building (ca. 1910-1912), and Pattern Building (1913). The E. & B. Holmes Machinery Company revolutionized the barrel making industry by patenting the design and manufacturing of machinery used for mass-producing barrels. The company operated from 1840 until 2002.

Plans announced in January 2010 are for the complex to be converted to "live and work" apartments and commercial space by Newark Niagara LLC in partnership with Clinton Brown Company Architecture. More information about the project can be found at River Lofts Buffalo.

Since 2019, the two-story section to the south has been the home of Resurgence Brewing Company. The other sections were torn down for a new building.

It was listed on the National Register of Historic Places in 2009.

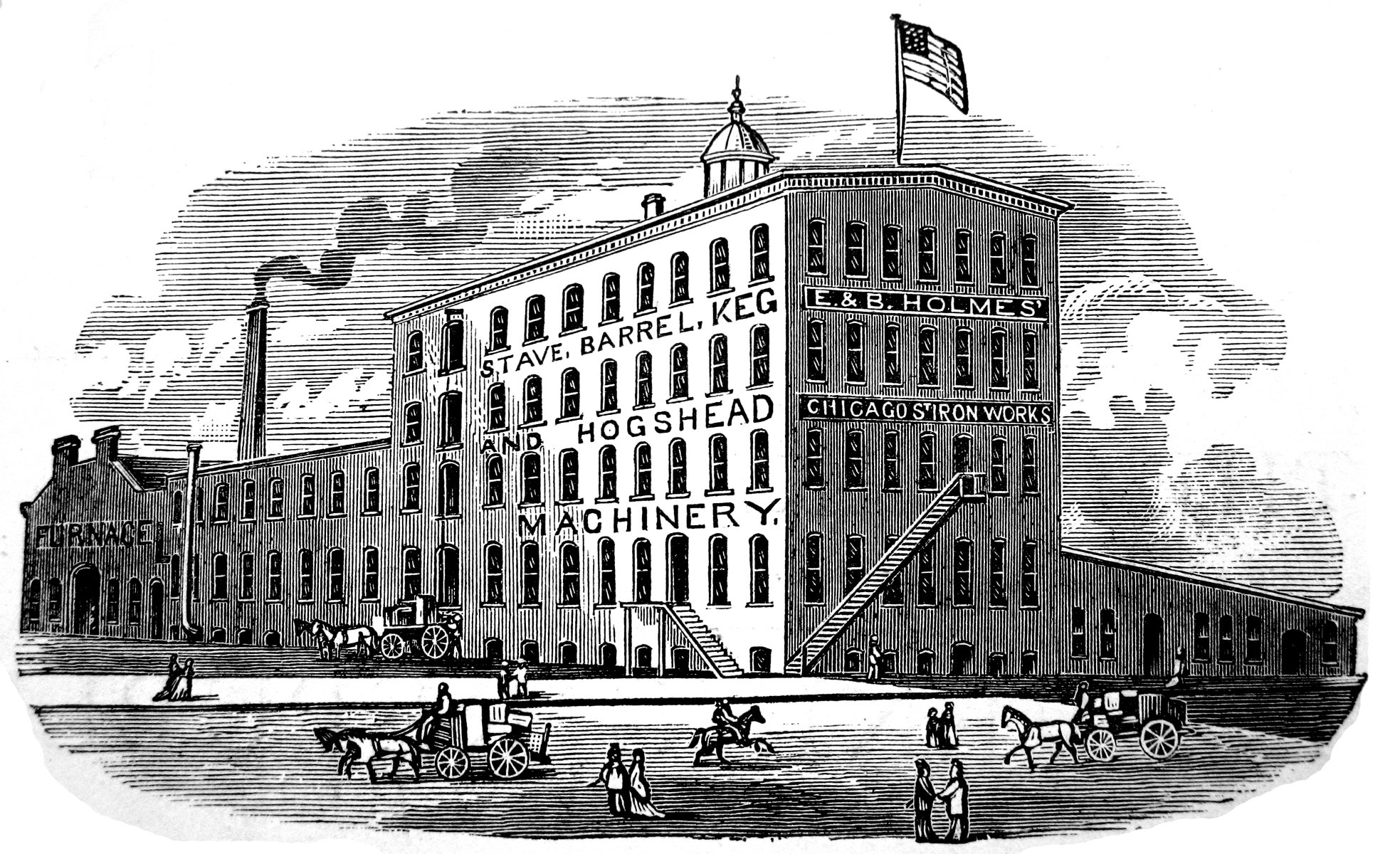
The E. & B. Machinery Company Building as it appeared in 1876

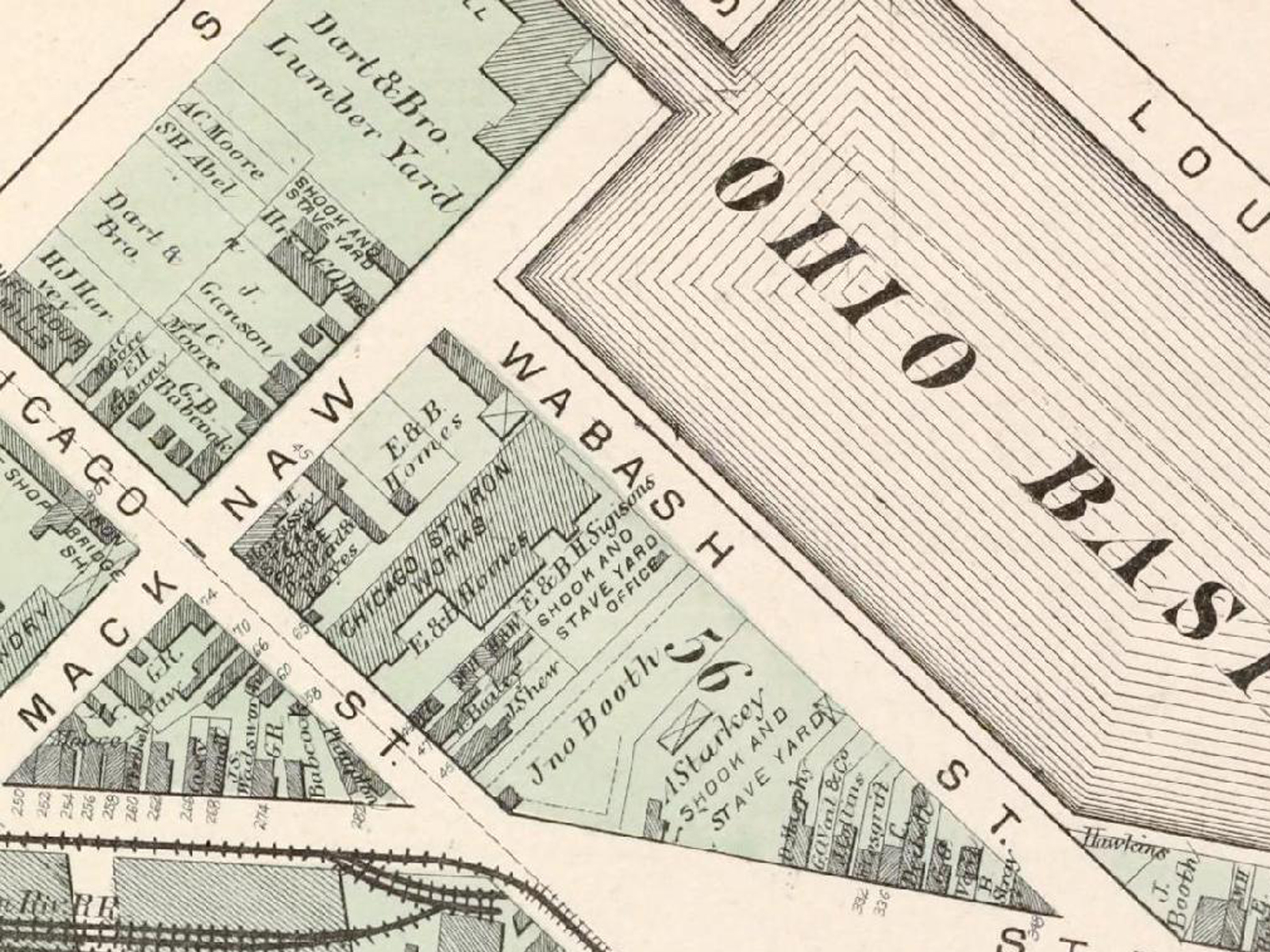
1872 Atlas Detail (building at center)

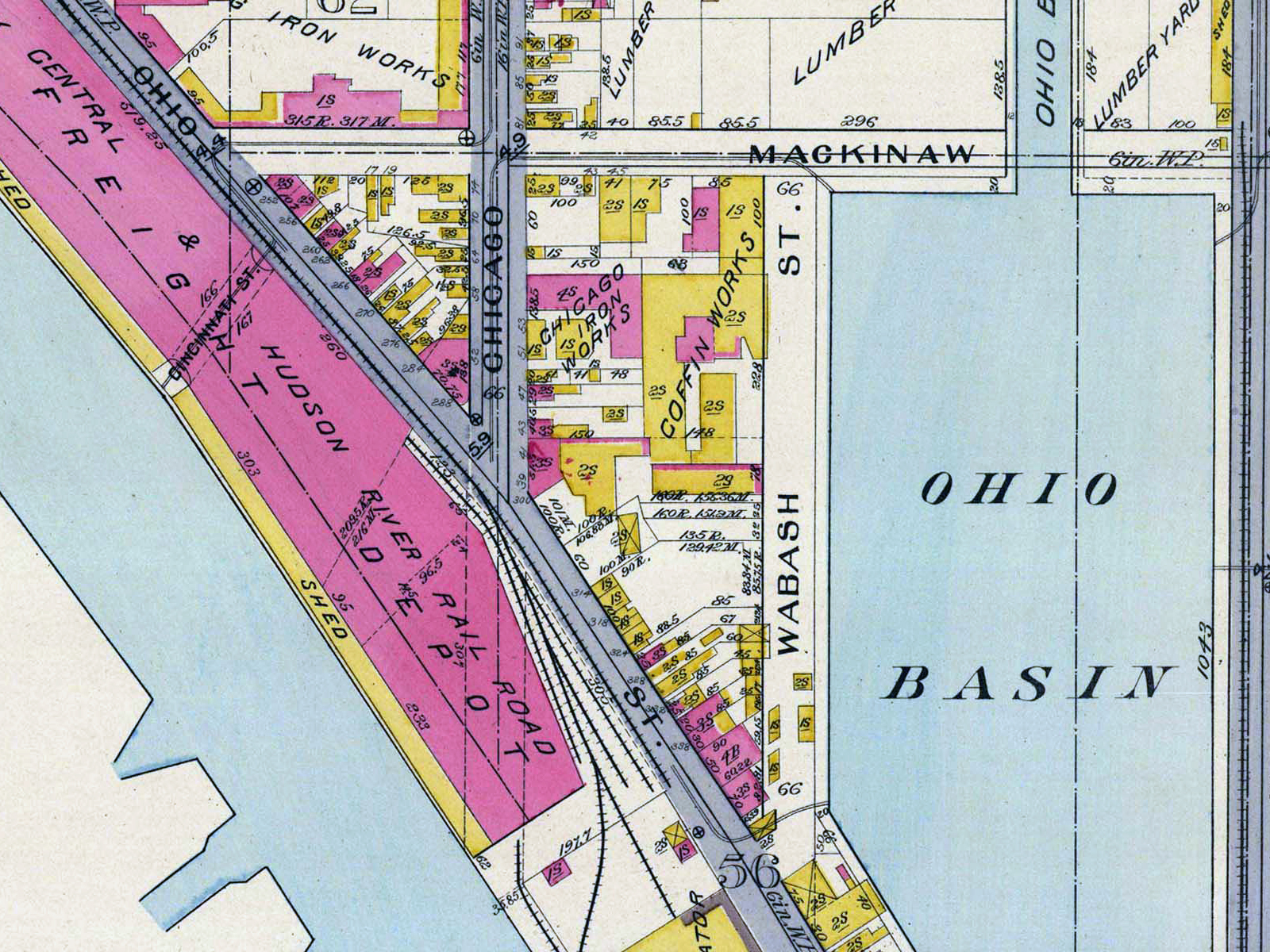
1894 Atlas Detail (building at center)

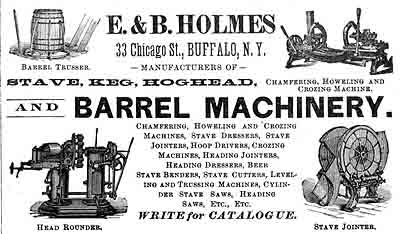
E. & B. Holmes Advertisement from 1889

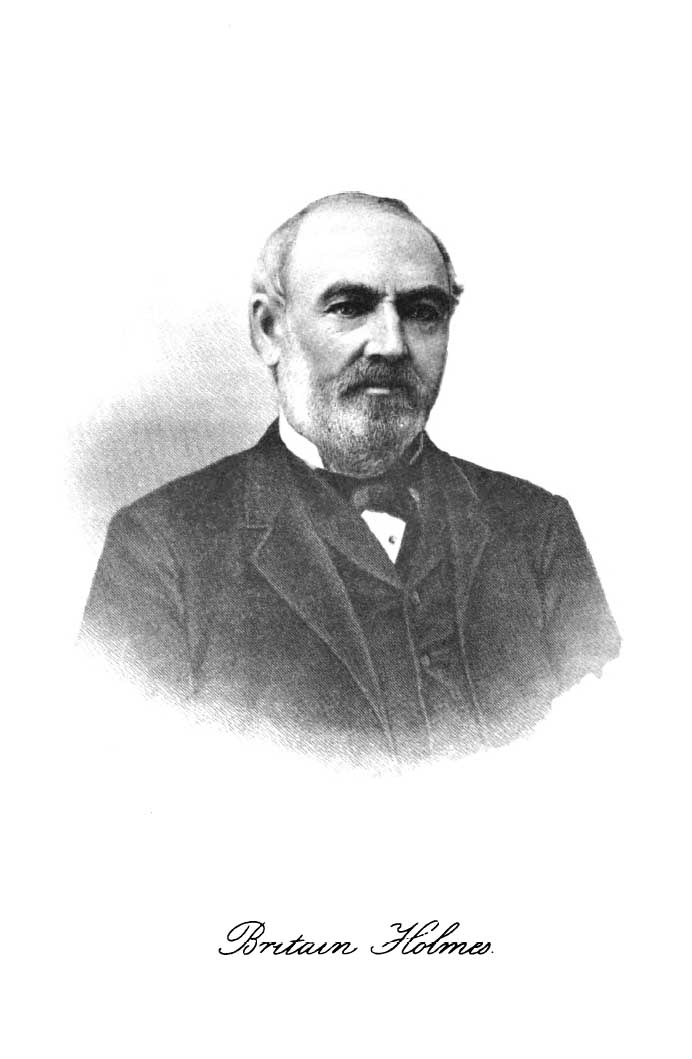
Britain Holmes, 1884

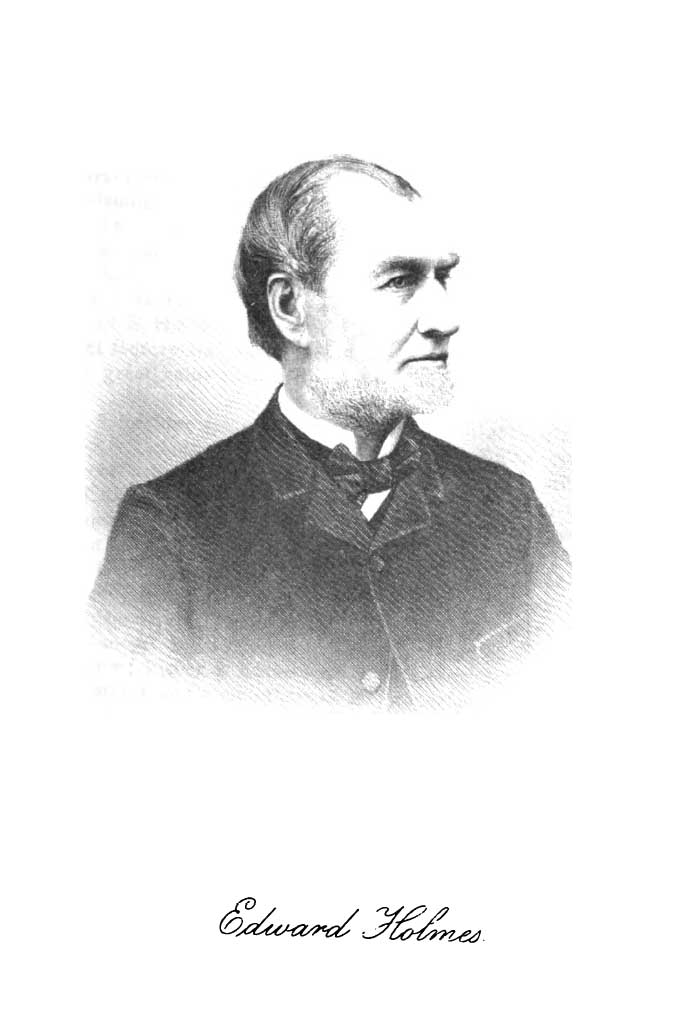
Edward Holmes, 1884
