= Eberz House =

Historic house in New York, United States

- U.S. National Register of Historic Places
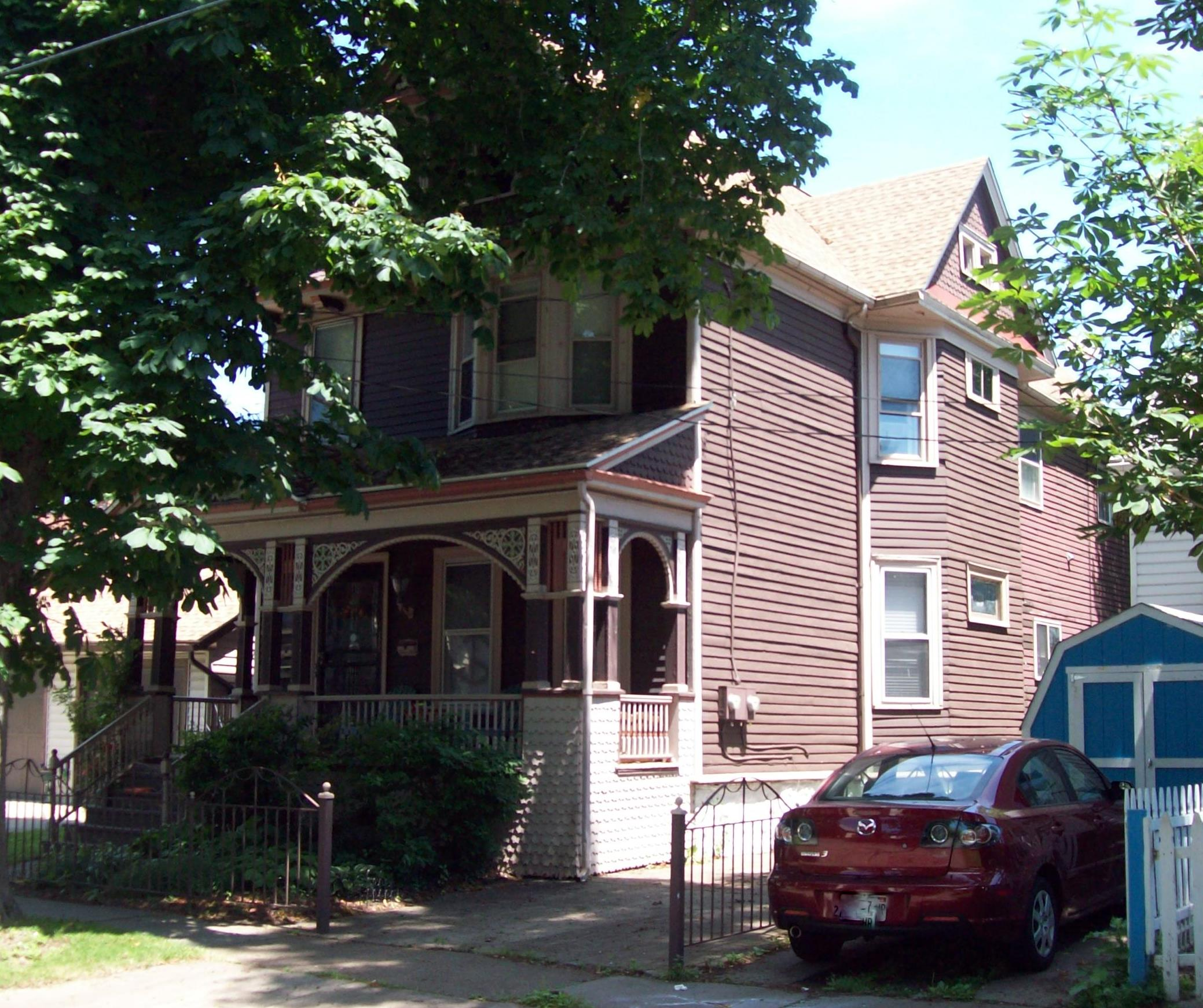
- Eberz House, July 2011

- Location within New York Location within the United States
- Location: 285 Dearborn Street, Buffalo, New York
- Coordinates: 42°56′14″N 78°54′08″W
- Area: under one acre
- Built: c. 1892
- Architectural style: Queen Anne
- MPS: Black Rock Planning Neighborhood MPS
- NRHP reference No.: 11000740
- Added to NRHP: October 18, 2011

Eberz House is a historic home located in the Black Rock neighborhood of Buffalo in Erie County, New York. It was built about 1892, and is a 2 1/2-story, wood-frame Queen Anne-style dwelling on a stone foundation. It features a highly decorated front porch with turned spindlework and textured surfaces. The Eberz family rented rooms for visitors to the Pan-American Exposition in 1901.

It was listed on the National Register of Historic Places in 2011.
