= Buffalo Trunk Manufacturing Company Building =

- U.S. National Register of Historic Places
- Buffalo Trunk Manufacturing Company Building, January 2020

- Location within New York Location within the United States
- Location: 125 Cherry St., Buffalo, New York
- Coordinates: 42°53′37.9″N 78°51′39.82″W
- Built: 1901
- Architect: Saenger, Louis
- NRHP reference No.: 10000027
- Added to NRHP: February 27, 2010

Buffalo Trunk Manufacturing Company Building is a historic factory and warehouse building located at Buffalo in Erie County, New York, United States. It is a five-story, eight-bay, red brick, L-shaped, flat-roofed industrial building constructed in two phases, 1901–1902 and 1906–1907. It is an example of "slow burn" masonry and wood factory construction.

It was listed on the National Register of Historic Places in 2010.

== Gallery ==
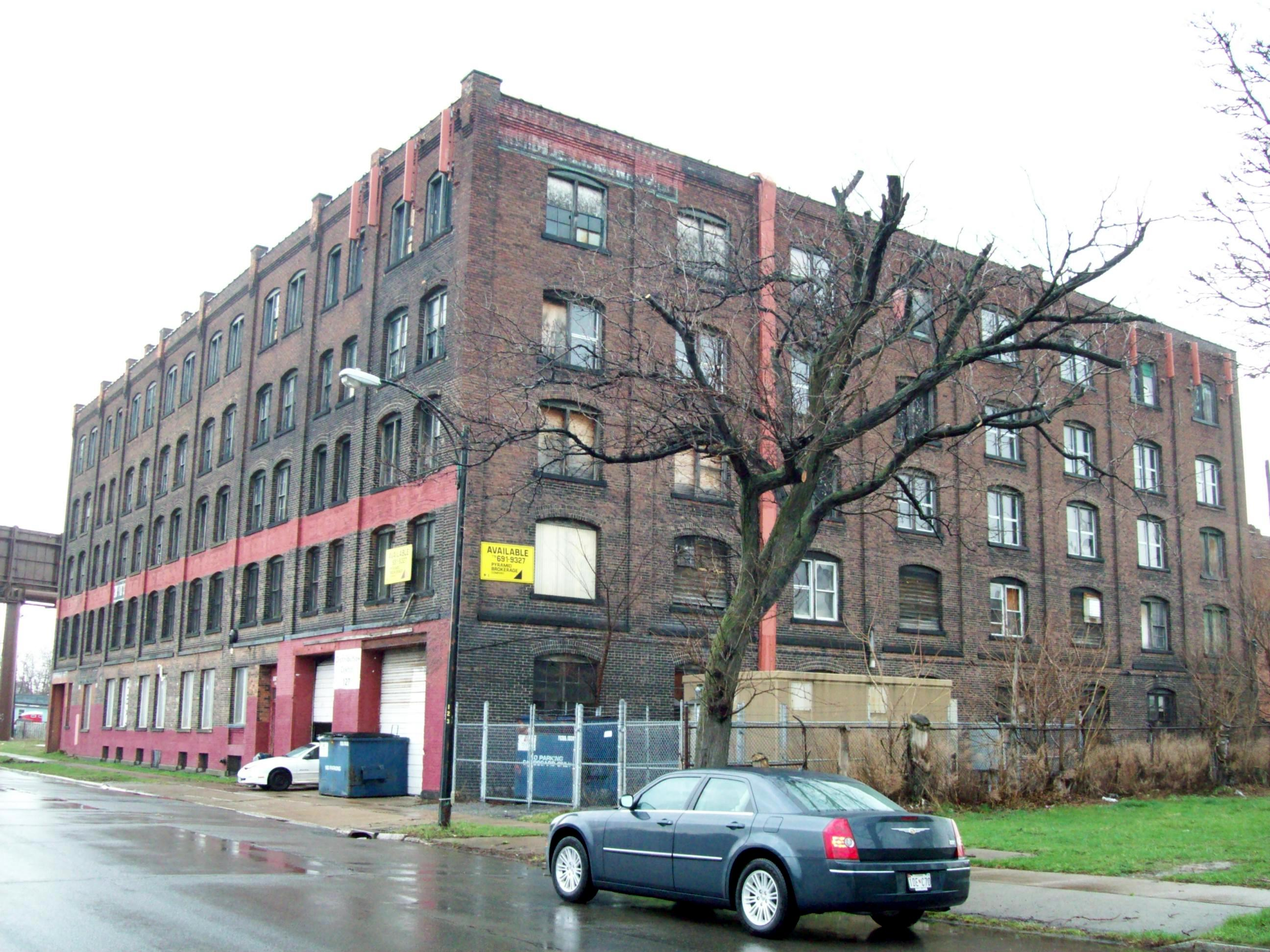
Buffalo Trunk Manufacturing Company Building, April 2010
