= Upper West Side, Buffalo =

Coordinates: 42.9200°N 78.8903°W

The Upper West Side is a neighborhood in Buffalo, New York.

== Geography ==
The Upper West Side is roughly bounded on the north by the Scajaquada Expressway - NY 198, on the south by Porter Avenue, on the east by Richmond Avenue, and on the west by the Niagara River. Adjacent neighborhoods include the Black Rock Neighborhood to the north, the Lower West Side and Allentown neighborhoods to the South, and the Elmwood Village to the east.

== Key Streets ==
=== Lafayette Avenue ===
Lafayette Avenue runs east to west and links the neighborhood to the Elmwood Village. It meets Richmond Avenue at Colonial Circle, a neighborhood landmark. Lafayette High School, Our Lady of Hope Parish, West Buffalo Charter School, and the former Annunciation School are all located along Lafayette Avenue.

=== West Ferry Street ===
West Ferry Street runs east to west across much of the city of Buffalo. A principal feature of West Ferry Street is the lift bridge over the Black Rock Channel to Unity Island (formerly known as Squaw Island) and Broderick Park. West Ferry meets Richmond Avenue at Ferry Circle, which was reconstructed in 2002 as designed by landscape architects Frederick Law Olmsted and Calvert Vaux.

=== Grant Street ===
The Grant-Ferry Commercial District, was once one of the most dynamic neighborhood commercial districts in Buffalo, and is still the heart of the West Side. It features many unique stores such as the West Side Bazaar, a small business incubator with a diverse array of international food and vendors. The area is being marketed as the "International Marketplace" of the City. It is commercial center of the city's large and growing Burmese immigrant community and includes many Burmese retailers.

=== Niagara Street ===
Niagara Street is a principal industrial corridor of the City of Buffalo, and runs adjacent to the Niagara Thruway through much of the West Side.

== History ==
The Upper West Side is a traditional landing zone for immigrant populations. Often associated with Sicilian immigrants who came to Buffalo in great numbers starting around the turn of the twentieth century, today the area has large Somali, Sudanese, Middle Eastern, Eastern European, Mexican and Central American, Puerto Rican, and Southeast Asian enclaves.

While the district has experienced significant disinvestment and blight, it is experiencing revitalization, reflecting the area's new demographic and interest from "urban pioneers" and recent immigrants.

From 2002 to 2016, 4,665 Burmese refugees settled in Buffalo.

== Colleges and universities ==
Near the northern boundary of this neighborhood is Buffalo State University, a college of the State University of New York. Its southern boundary includes D'Youville College, along Porter Avenue and Connecticut Street. Many of the students at these and other area colleges and universities choose to live in the Upper West Side.

== Notable places ==
- St. Johns Grace Episcopal Church
- Push Community Vegetable Gardens
- International School #45
- Connecticut Street Armory
- Grover Cleveland High School

== See also ==
- Neighborhoods of Buffalo, New York
