= Lower West Side, Buffalo =

Human settlement in Buffalo, New York, United States of America

Coordinates: 42°53′40″N 78°53′10″W

The Lower West Side is a neighborhood in Buffalo, New York, adjacent to Downtown Buffalo.

== Geography ==
The Lower West Side is bounded on the north by Porter Avenue and the Upper West Side. On the east Allentown with its historic district which ends approximately at Plymouth Avenue. To the south is Niagara Square and the West Village, while west is the Niagara River and Interstate 190.

The main streets which run through the Lower West Side are Niagara Street (N-S) and Virginia Street (E-W). Part of the historic Frederick Law Olmsted Buffalo Parks & Parkway System is contained in the Lower West Side.

- Porter Avenue
- Front Park
- Columbus Park (Formerly Prospect Park)

Although not an Olmsted Park, LaSalle Park is part of the Buffalo Parks System and is the largest park in the Lower West Side.

The Lower West Side was primarily a largely Italian-American neighborhood. In the last 50 years, the neighborhood has become a largely Puerto Rican neighborhood, although it has also received recent criticism from long time residents that are apprehensive of the gentrification of the last decade.

== Notable places ==
- Grover Cleveland High School
- D'Youville College
- Leonardo da Vinci High School
- Waterfront Elementary School
- Hutch-Tech High School
- Herman Badillo Bilingual Academy Public School #76
- Niagara Cafe
- D'Youville Porter Campus School

== See also ==
- Neighborhoods of Buffalo, New York
