= Delaware District, Buffalo =

Neighborhood in Buffalo, New York

Coordinates: 42.955°N 78.874°W

The Delaware District is a neighborhood in Buffalo, New York.

== Geography ==
The Delaware District neighborhood is in the west central part of Buffalo. The neighborhood is located along Delaware Avenue (NY 384). The neighborhood is bordered on the south by Allentown. The northern boundary of the neighborhood abuts Forest Lawn Cemetery and Delaware Park. Its eastern boundary is Main Street (NY 5). To the west is Delaware Avenue and the Elmwood Village.

== Historic sites ==
It includes the individual entries on the Buffalo places listed on the National Register of Historic Places:

- Garret Club
- Hellenic Orthodox Church of the Annunciation
- James and Fanny How House
- Edgar W. Howell House
- Edwin M. and Emily S. Johnston House
- Col. William Kelly House
- Parke Apartments
- Theodore Roosevelt Inaugural National Historic Site
- Saturn Club.

Also located in the neighborhood are Twentieth Century Club and the Women & Children's Hospital of Buffalo. Much of the central section of the neighborhood is within the Delaware Avenue Historic District.

== See also ==
- Neighborhoods of Buffalo, New York
