= Redstone Historic District =

Redstone Historic District may refer to:

- Redstone Historic District (Colorado), listed on the National Register of Historic Places in Pitkin County, Colorado
- Redstone Historic District (Burlington, Vermont), listed on the National Register of Historic Places in Chittenden County, Vermont
