= Elmwood Historic District–East =

Historic district in New York, United States

- U.S. National Register of Historic Places
- U.S. Historic district
- New York State Register of Historic Places
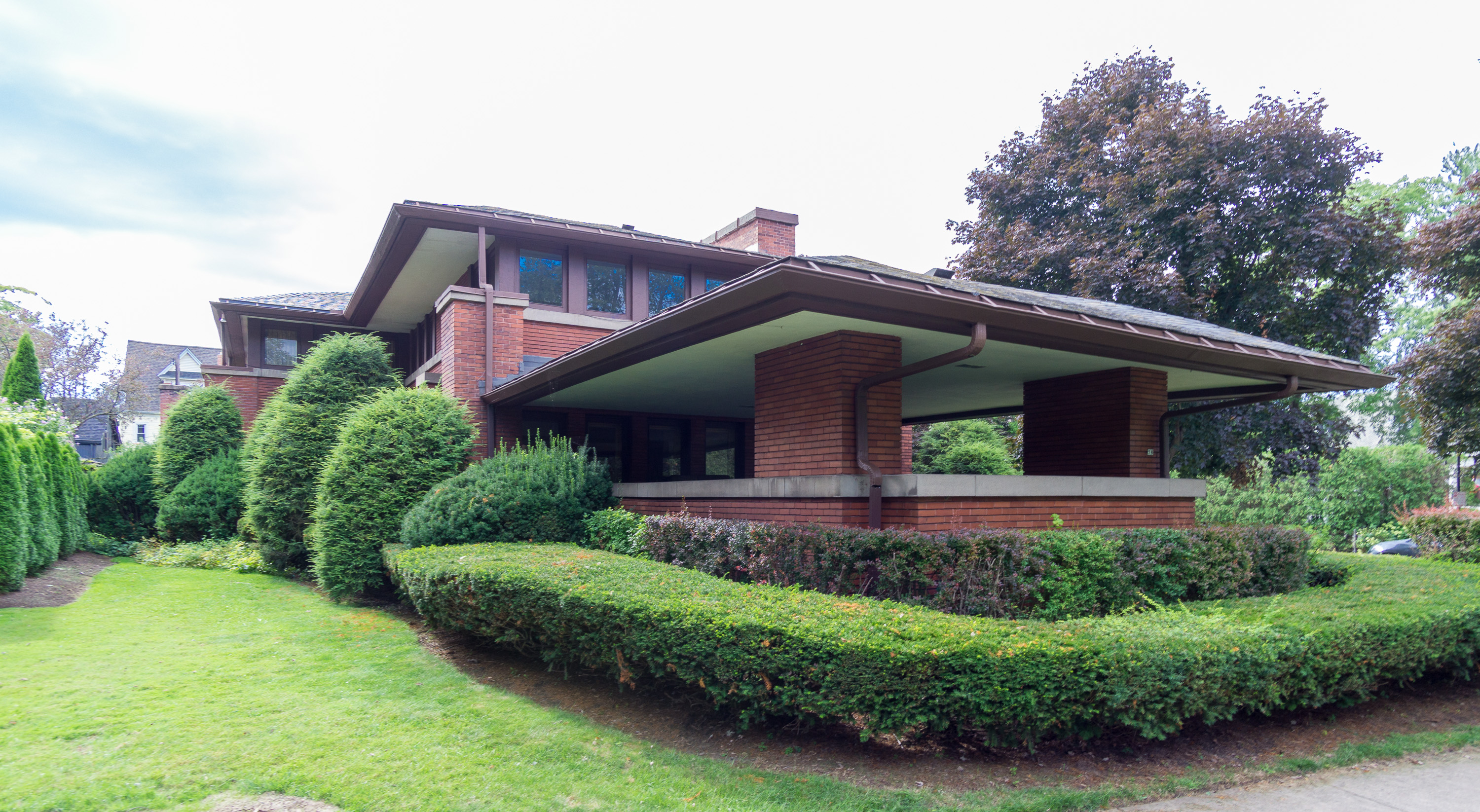
- William R. Heath House

- Location within New York Location within the United States
- Interactive map showing the location of Elmwood Historic District-East
- Location: Portions of Auburn, Bird, Cleveland, Delaware, Elmwood, Forest & Hodge Aves., Anderson, Atlantic & Berkley Pls., Buffalo, New York
- Coordinates: 42°55′03″N 78°52′31″W
- Area: 405.76 acres (164.21 ha)
- Built: 1867-1965
- Architects: Frank Lloyd Wright; Green & Wicks; Backus, Crane & Love; Edward Austin Kent and William Winthrop Kent
- Architectural style: Queen Anne, Shingle Style, Colonial Revival, Tudor Revival, Bungalow/craftsman
- NRHP reference No.: 16000108

Significant dates
- Added to NRHP: March 22, 2016
- Designated NYSRHP: December 4, 2015

Elmwood Historic District–East is a national historic district located at Buffalo, Erie County, New York. The district encompasses 2,405 contributing buildings, 31 contributing structures, and 14 contributing objects in the Elmwood Village neighborhood of Buffalo. It is bounded on the north by Delaware Park, Forest Lawn Cemetery, and the former Buffalo State Asylum, on the south by the Allentown Historic District, and on the west by the Elmwood Historic District–West. This predominantly residential district developed between about 1867 and 1965, and includes notable examples of Queen Anne, Shingle Style, Colonial Revival, Tudor Revival, and American Craftsman style architecture. The district contains one of the most intact collections of built resources from turn of the 20th century in the city of Buffalo and western New York State. Located in the district are 17 contributing properties previously listed on the NRHP in their own right, including the Buffalo Seminary, Garret Club, James and Fanny How House, Edgar W. Howell House, Edwin M. and Emily S. Johnston House, Col. William Kelly House, Lafayette Avenue Presbyterian Church, Parke Apartments, and the Unitarian Universalist Church of Buffalo. Other notable buildings include the Frank Lloyd Wright designed William R. Heath House (1904–1905), Herbert H. Hewitt House (c. 1898), School 56 (1910–1911), the Harlow House (c. 1892), A. Conger Goodyear house (c. 1908), Alexander Main Curtiss House (now the Ronald McDonald House, 1895), Nardin Academy campus (c. 1914), and Coatsworth House (1897).

It was listed on the National Register of Historic Places in 2016.
