= Elmwood Historic District–West =

Historic district in New York, United States

- U.S. National Register of Historic Places
- U.S. Historic district
- New York State Register of Historic Places
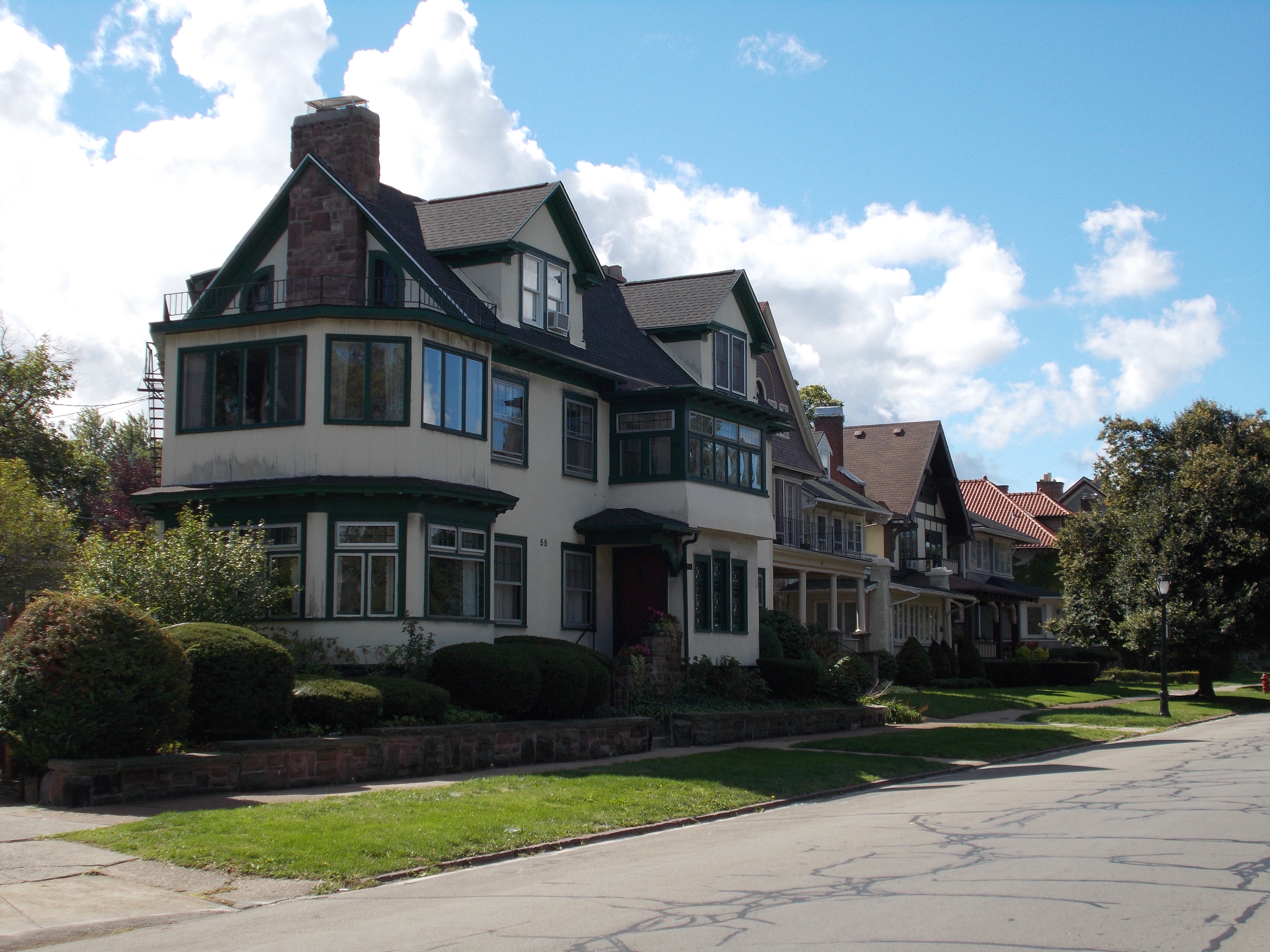
- Homes on Bidwell Pkwy near Ashland, Buffalo, NY, September 2012

- Location within New York Location within the United States
- Location: Roughly Ashland, Auburn, Bird, Claremont, Elmwood, Forest, Highland, Hodge, Lafayette, Lexington, Norwood Aves., Buffalo, New York
- Coordinates: 42°55′07″N 78°52′43″W
- Area: 296.76 acres (120.09 ha)
- Built: 1867-1941
- Architects: Edward Austin Kent; E.B. Green and William Wicks; Bertram Grosvenor Goodhue; Bethune, Bethune and Fuchs; Esenwein & Johnson; William L. Schmolle
- Architectural style: Queen Anne, Shingle Style, Colonial Revival, Tudor Revival, Bungalow/craftsman
- NRHP reference No.: 12000996

Significant dates
- Added to NRHP: December 4, 2012
- Designated NYSRHP: September 28, 2012

Elmwood Historic District–West is a national historic district located at Buffalo, Erie County, New York. The district encompasses 1,971 contributing buildings, 4 contributing structures, and 13 contributing objects in the Elmwood Village neighborhood of Buffalo. It is built around the Buffalo Parks and Parkways system bounded on the north by Delaware Park, Forest Lawn Cemetery, and the former Buffalo State Asylum, on the south by the Allentown Historic District, and on the east by the Elmwood Historic District–East. This predominantly residential district developed between about 1867 and 1941, and includes notable examples of Queen Anne, Shingle Style, Colonial Revival, Tudor Revival, and American Craftsman style architecture. The district contains one of the most intact collections of built resources from turn of the 20th century in the city of Buffalo and western New York State. Located in the district are six previously listed contributing resources including the Richmond Avenue Methodist-Episcopal Church and the Buffalo Tennis and Squash Club. Other notable building include the H.C. Gerber House (1908), the Fred Dullard House (1910), the William H. Scott House (1904), St. John's-Grace Episcopal Church designed by Bertram Grosvenor Goodhue (1925–26), Davidson House (1885), former Jehle Grocery Store and Residence (c. 1886, 1899), St. Luke's Episcopal Church (now Symphony Bible Church, 1886, 1893), Temple Beth El (now Greater Emmanuel Temple Church, Inc., 1910–1911), Richmond Avenue Church of Christ (now Bryant Parish Condominiums (c. 1885–1887), and Pilgrim-St. Luke's United Church of Christ (1911).

It was listed on the National Register of Historic Places in 2016.
