= Lafayette Avenue Presbyterian Church (Buffalo, New York) =

Historic church in New York, United States

- U.S. National Register of Historic Places
- U.S. Historic district – Contributing property
- New York State Register of Historic Places
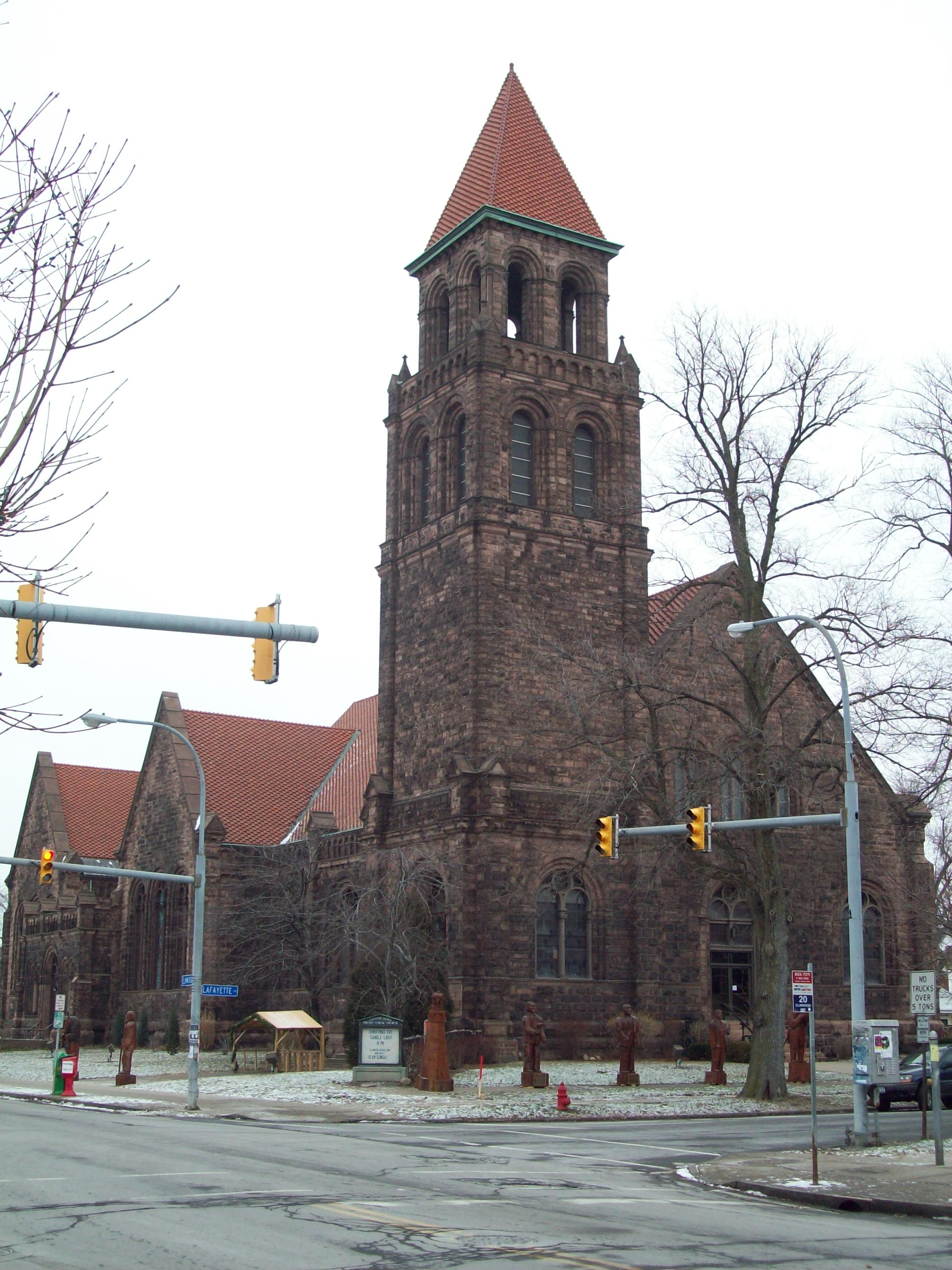
- (December 2009)

- Location within New York Location within the United States
- Location: 875 Elmwood Avenue; Buffalo, New York
- Coordinates: 42°55′15.31″N 78°52′37.17″W
- Built: 1894
- Architects: Lansing & Beierl and North & Shelgren
- Architectural style: Romanesque Revival
- NRHP reference No.: 09000630
- NYSRHP No.: 02940.003837

Significant dates
- Added to NRHP: August 21, 2009
- Designated NYSRHP: June 30, 2009

Lafayette Avenue Presbyterian Church is a historic Presbyterian church complex located at 875 Elmwood Ave, Buffalo in Erie County, New York. The church is part of the Presbytery of Western New York which is part the Synod of the Northeast, a regional body of the Presbyterian Church (USA). The complex consists of the large cruciform-plan church building that was built in 1894 with an attached rear chapel. Adjoining them is the Community House that constructed of brick in the Tudor Revival style, that was built in 1921. The main church building is constructed of Medina sandstone with a terra cotta tile roof in the Romanesque Revival style. It features a 120-foot-tall (37 m), square bell tower with a pyramidal roof. The church cost $150,000 to build and has a capacity of 1,000 people

== History ==
The current church was the parish's third, and was built in response to demand for a larger place of worship. The parish originally worshiped in a building located at Lafayette Square.

The Lafayette Avenue Presbyterian Church was listed on the National Register of Historic Places in 2009. It is located in the Elmwood Historic District–East.
