= Ancient tree =

Ancient tree may refer to:

- Trees in ancient woodland
- Veteran trees, individual trees noteworthy for their age
  - Ancient Tree Inventory, a project of the Woodland Trust to catalogue ancient and veteran trees
- Trees in Paleobotany, which may be fossilised
  - Significant in the formation of coal
  - Fossil wood, fossils of ancient trees

== See also ==
- List of oldest trees
- Old Trees, a national historic district in New York
