= Herbert C. Burdett =

American architect

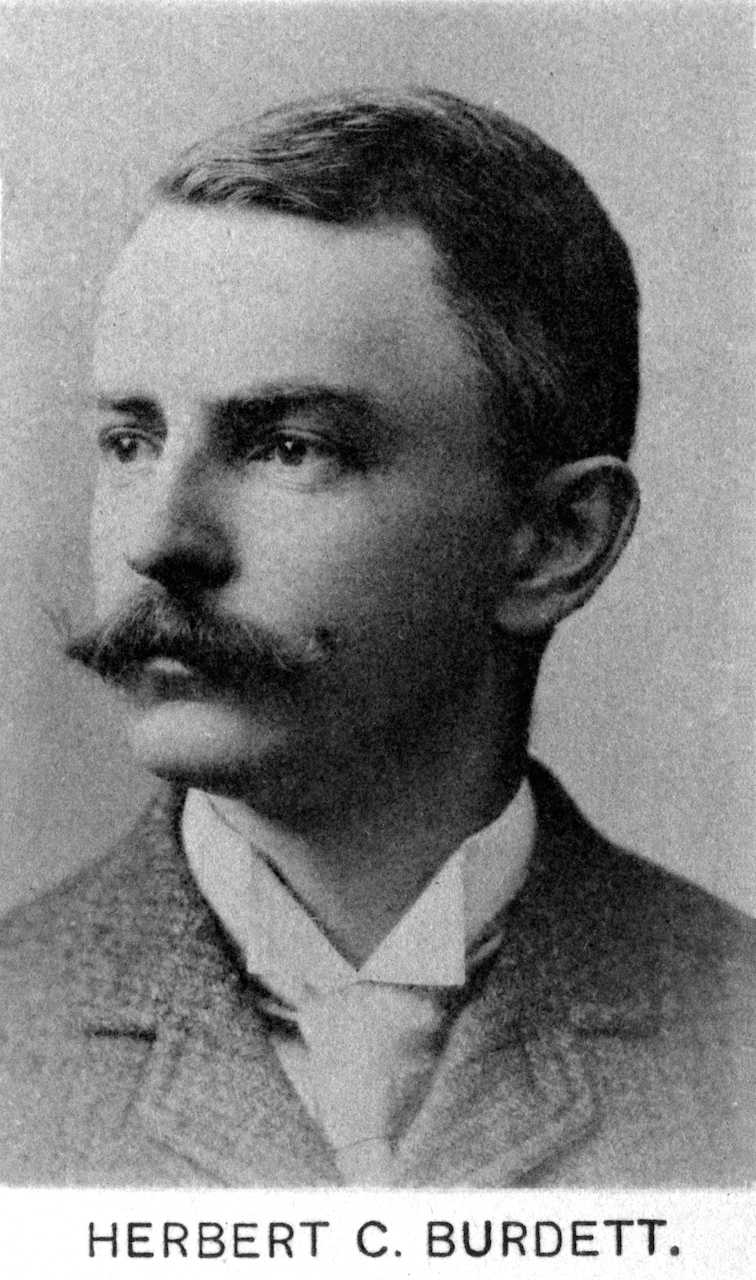
- Photograph from Leominster Historical and Picturesque, 1888
- Born: Herbert Channing Burditt; April 26, 1855; Boston, Massachusetts, U.S.
- Died: April 10, 1891 (aged 35); Buffalo, New York, U.S.
- Education: Harvard College
- Occupation: Architect
- Practice: Hartwell & Richardson; Henry Hobson Richardson; Shepley, Rutan and Coolidge; Marling & Burdett
- Buildings: Saturn Club, Buffalo (1890); William H Hamlin House, Buffalo; Church of the Good Shepherd, Buffalo; Redstone (Burlington, Vermont)
- Design: Richardsonian Romanesque; Shingle Style

Herbert Channing Burdett (1855–1891) was an American architect trained in the office of Henry Hobson Richardson who, in a brief career, established himself as a successful designer of Shingle Style and Richardsonian Romanesque buildings in western New York. With his partner James Herbert Marling (1857–1895), Burdett designed several public buildings in Buffalo, New York and a number of residential properties for the leading citizens of Buffalo, Woodstock, Ontario and Burlington, Vermont. Owing to his premature death, Burdett is little remembered today outside those areas where his known buildings still survive.

== Early life ==
Herbert Burdett was born on April 26, 1855, at 47 West Cedar Street in Boston, Massachusetts, the eldest of four children of Alfred Locke Burditt (1831–1901) and Mary Anna Joslin Burditt (1832–1900). A. L. Burditt, a native of Leominster, Massachusetts, was the longtime cashier of Leominster National Bank, as well as the treasurer of Leominster Savings Bank and, according to The New York Times, “one of the best-known financiers in Worcester County.” Previous generations of Burditts were among the founders of the area's famed comb industry.

When Herbert Burdett was young the family moved briefly to Sterling, Illinois, before returning to Leominster in 1861. In 1872 Burdett (by which time he and his siblings had changed the spelling of their surname) graduated from the town's Field High School. For the next two years he delayed entry to higher education due to ill health, recuperating at the family home at 8 Grove Avenue before entering Harvard College in 1874.

== Education ==
In 1878 Burdett graduated with a Bachelor of Arts degree from Harvard, where he was remembered as “a good student, of quiet tastes, unfailing good nature, courteous bearing, and excellent common sense. He attained a credible standing in College, reaching a disquisition on graduation. He was a member of Phi Beta Kappa honor society, the Pi Eta Society and the Harvard Natural History Society."

For a year after graduation, Burdett remained in Cambridge, Massachusetts and continued taking courses at Harvard and studied law under the direction of a Boston lawyer before becoming “devoted to history and to several miscellaneous subjects he was unable to take up during the College Course.” Thereafter he spent the next two years teaching Latin, Greek, Mathematics and Drawing at small private schools in Delaware, Connecticut and Pennsylvania.

== Architectural training ==
In August 1881, Herbert Burdett entered the drawing office of the newly established architectural practice of Hartwell & Richardson at 68 Devonshire Street in Boston, “devoting himself to the study of architecture with the intention of making it his profession.” Burdett may well have worked on Hartwell & Richardson's first major commission, the Richardsonian Romanesque Belmont Public Library, in Belmont, Massachusetts.

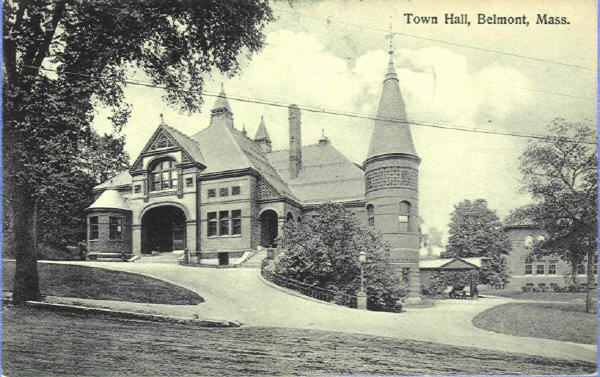
Belmont Town Hall by Hartwell & Richardson, 1881-82

After spending two years as a draughtsman for Hartwell & Richardson, in October 1883 Burdett left the firm to join the Brookline, Massachusetts, office of Henry Hobson Richardson (1838–1886), then considered America's leading architect and well known for fostering young and upcoming talents such as Stanford White and Charles Follen McKim. Richardson was a major influence on a generation of architects such as Louis Sullivan and Frank Lloyd Wright.

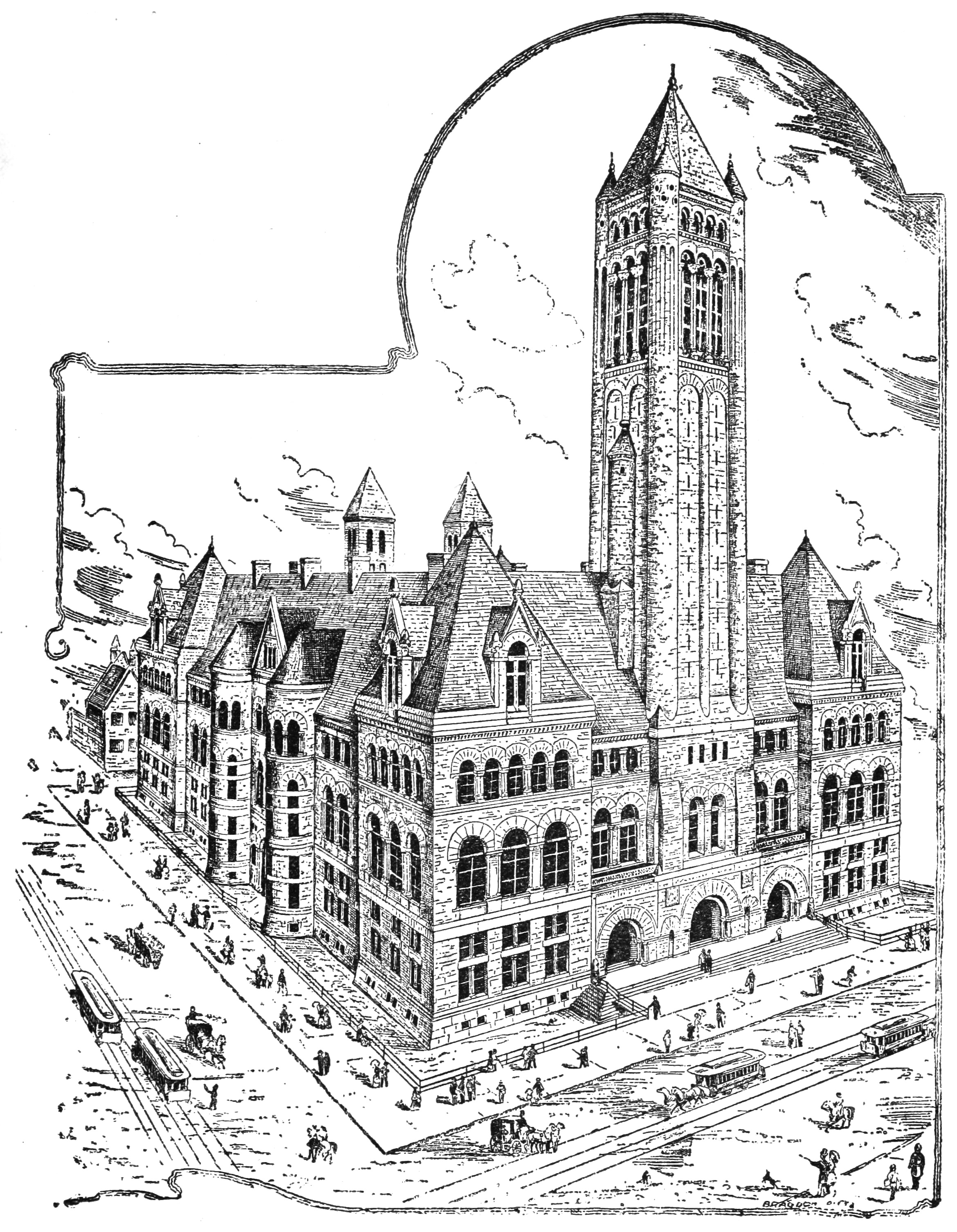
Allegheny County Courthouse, Pittsburgh, PA, designed by H.H. Richardson c.1883-84

It is unclear on which projects Burdett was engaged once he joined Richardson's atelier, as the firm enjoyed a large portfolio of residential, commercial and public works across the country at the time. However, when Burdett took up his new position in Brookline, Richardson's office was in the process of developing the competition entry for the proposed Allegheny County Courthouse in Pittsburgh, Pennsylvania, a commission it ultimately won in January 1884. It is believed that during his three years in the practice, Burdett worked on the courthouse project, a design Richardson himself considered to be one of his most successful.

Around the time he joined the Richardson office, Burdett appears to have undertaken a small commission in his own right: the provision of plans to improve the Commons of his home town of Leominster.

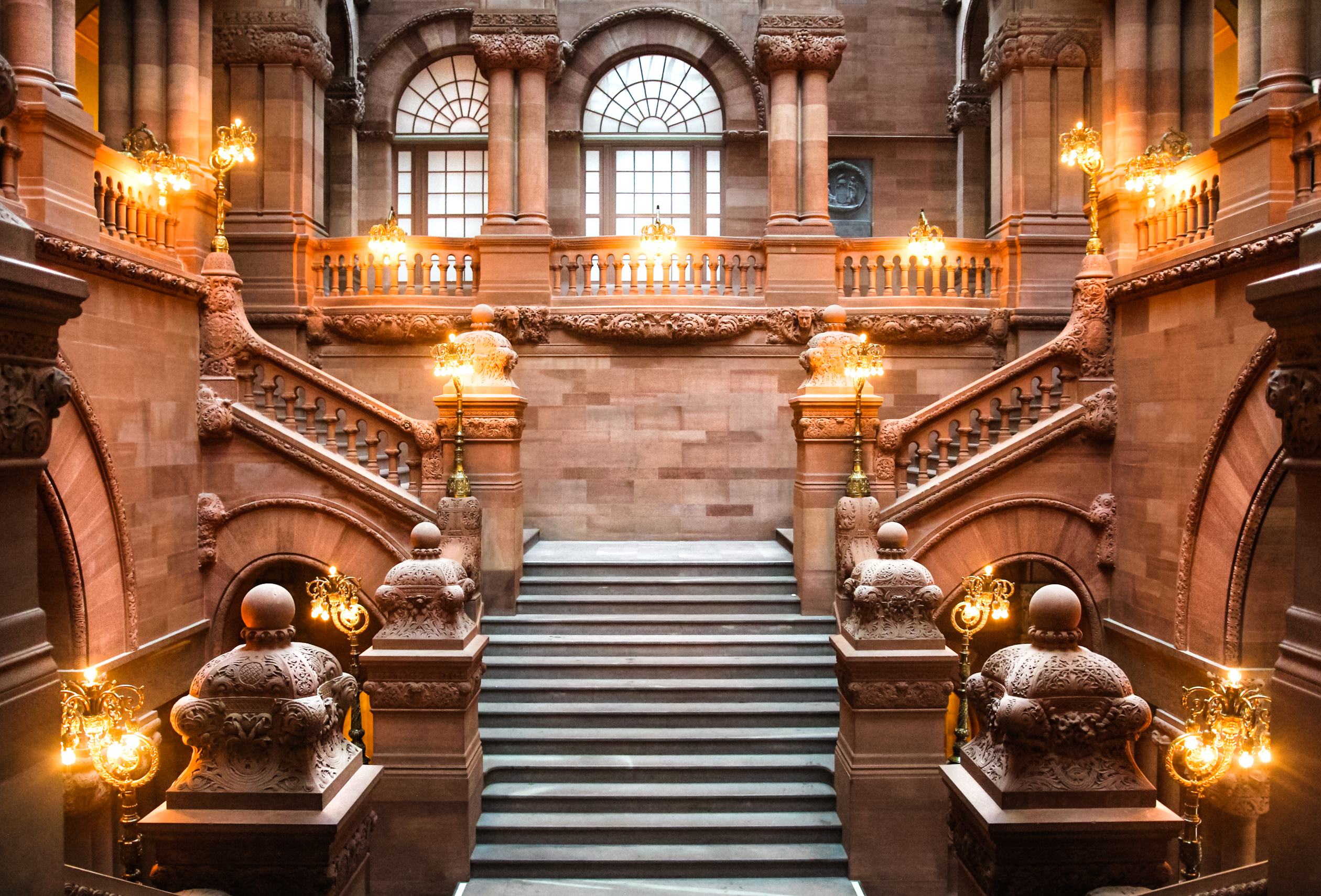
The "Million Dollar Staircase" at New York State Capitol, Albany, NY

Another major project at the firm at this time was the completion of the New York State Capitol at Albany, a commission shared by Richardson and fellow architect Leopold Eidlitz, landscape architect Frederick Law Olmsted and, latterly, capitol commissioner Isaac G. Perry. The main phases of construction were divided between Richardson and Eidlitz, with Olmsted advising and, from 1883, Perry acting as the driving force to complete the designs and keep the building functioning during the course of construction. Richardson's main design tasks included the completion of the building's south side, including the Senate Chamber and the Great Western Staircase. This main stair was originally conceived by Richardson and was well underway at the time of his death in 1886, though Perry was later responsible for designing the wealth of elaborate carving that earned it the sobriquet of "the Million Dollar Staircase." The full role of Herbert Burdett in the design and construction of the New York State Capitol requires further research, but it has been established that he worked not only on the Senate Chamber but also provided designs for the state library and the west staircase.

It is also known that at this time Burdett furnished preliminary drawings of Richardson's proposed new city hall in Albany, work that the American Institute of Architects called "a charming bit of work for both."

When H. H. Richardson died in March, 1886, he bequeathed his practice to three senior associates, George Foster Shepley (1860–1903), Charles Hercules Rutan (1851–1914), and Charles Allerton Coolidge (1858–1936). The newly re-christened firm of Shepley, Rutan and Coolidge completed existing Richardson projects such as the Allegheny County Courthouse and the iconic John J. Glessner House in Chicago, as well as taking on new commissions for "Richardsonian" buildings around New England in the late 1880s and 1890s. Burdett seems to have stayed on with the successor firm and continued living in Brookline, and it is believed that he was occasionally dispatched to Buffalo in 1886 to oversee the construction of Richardson's final residential commission, the William H. Gratwick house at 776 Delaware Avenue.

It is likely that during one of these trips to Buffalo from his home in Brookline, Burdett encountered local architect James Herbert Marling, who, early in 1887, had just disbanded his partnership with Joseph Silsbee, best known as the first employer of Frank Lloyd Wright. According to Burdett, "in February, 1887, I came to Buffalo, and since that time I have been in business on my own account, with J. H. Marling, in the firm of Marling and Burdett, architects, and have been reasonably prosperous."

== Marling & Burdett ==
The earliest commissions undertaken by the new Buffalo partnership of J. H. Marling and H. C. Burdett are difficult to identify with certainty, as there appears to be a number of Silsbee & Marling projects in that firm's final year or two that were either completed or reworked by the successor firm. In fact, some sites once thought to be early works of Marling & Burdett are now known to be late efforts by Silsbee & Marling.

=== Institutional and recreational works ===
The first major commission undertaken by the new Buffalo partnership was also a high-profile one: the city's International Industrial Fair planned for 1889, billed as "An Exposition of the Arts, Industries and Breeding Interests of the United States and Canada." The new Fair buildings included an art gallery, industrial and agricultural expositions, sporting facilities, administration blocks and restaurants. A contemporary account of Burdett's hometown of Leominster commented on the work of their erstwhile resident: "The International Fair Building, the largest, so far as known, in the world, and the finest, from an architectural point of view, of any ever constructed in this country, was recently built from their plans. The accompanying drawing of his building will be interesting to the schoolmates and friends of Mr. Burdett here in his native town, showing, as it does, the advancement he has made in his chosen profession." Another project that attracted much attention to Marling & Burdett was the Episcopal Church of the Good Shepherd on Jewett Parkway in Buffalo's Parkside neighborhood. Originally a Silsbee & Marling commission, the design was reworked once Burdett joined the practice in 1887. The refinements to the exterior included extending the height of the tower and replacing single, louvered round-arched openings on each site with three narrow round-arched of equal heights, shortening and relocating the entrance porch and reducing the fenestration of the nave and transept gables from a large mullioned round-arch window above a series of square openings to a series of three narrow round-arch lights in keeping with those at the top of the tower. Altogether the new design more closely adhered to the principles of Richardsonian Romanesque with its references to the Ames Free Library built by Burdett's former master in North Easton, Massachusetts a decade before. The first major Marling & Burdett project to be attributed solely to Herbert Burdett was Buffalo's original Saturn Club, a private club founded in 1885. After five years in temporary locations, the "college men's social and whist club" purchased a site on the corner of Delaware and Edward Streets for a purpose-built building and turned to a fellow member for the design. According to a contemporary account, the "new and beautiful club house ... [was] one of the unique and striking structures of Delaware Avenue, the architectural design being that of the skilful architect, Mr Herbert C. Burdett." The success of the Saturn Club was such, however, that by the early 1920s the membership had expanded to the point where the club relocated to larger premises constructed further north on Delaware Avenue and the Burdett building was sold to B'Nai B'Brith for use as a Montefiore Club.

=== Residential works ===
During the fifty months of their architectural partnership, J. H. Marling and H. C. Burdett produced designs for at least a dozen residential properties in and around Buffalo, as well others in Woodstock, Ontario, Burlington, Vermont and eastern Massachusetts. Many of the early residential projects came to the partnership through contacts developed out of Silsbee & Marling commissions (such as the wealthy Hamlin family), and undoubtedly projects such as the International Fair brought them to the attention of influential clients like Jewett M Richmond, city councillor, leading businessman and "one of Buffalo's foremost citizens," who sat on the Fair's board. In addition to their palatial designs for William H Hamlin house at 1058 Delaware Avenue (demolished 1938) and the J. M. Richmond house at 844 Delaware Avenue (extant), other more modest houses known to have been designed by Marling & Burdett were constructed in Elmwood, Linwood, Summer and Fargo Avenues in Buffalo. Number 354 Fargo Avenue is considered to be the last surviving example of Richardsonian Romanesque domestic architecture in the city, and features a tripartite set of round-arch windows in a brick version of the pattern built in stone at the Church of the Good Shepherd.

Marling & Burdett are also credited with two Shingle Style houses in eastern Massachusetts in late 1880s, although these are likely to be purely Burdett designs as the commissions were received through personal relationships. Around 1889, Burdett was commissioned by his former Harvard classmate, local lawyer and US Attorney Warren Kendall Blodgett Junior, to provide plans for a family house at 7 Acacia Street in Cambridge. Featuring a tall projecting pedimented gable, the Blodgett house also incorporated a recessed entrance porch and a Richardsonian turret topped by a conical roof. The Blodgett house still stands although was greatly altered by a matching conical tower on the western side and a front entrance porch of contemporary design.

The other Massachusetts house known to have been designed by Herbert Burdett was constructed at 67 Orchard Street, Leominster, for his younger brother, William Chase Burdett, around 1887–88. The house was one of the purest Shingle Style designs produced by H. C. Burdett, with many features – e.g. tall projecting gables, decorative console brackets, multiple shingle shapes and patterns, bay and shuttered colonial windows – adapted directly from such iconic buildings as Richardson's William Watts Sherman House and McKim, Mead & White's Isaac Bell House in Newport, Rhode Island. The W.C. Burdett house remained in the family until the late 1950s and is extant today, though it has been repainted many times over the past century and has recently been much altered internally.

Other Marling & Burdett designs built outside of Buffalo include a lakeside house in Aurora, New York, for W. C. Cornwell, President of Buffalo City Bank, three houses in Woodstock, Ontario, and one of Burdett's most distinguished compositions, Redstone, for wealthy lumber merchant and former Buffalo resident Andrew A. Buell in Burlington, Vermont.

The Redstone estate, comprising a mansion, stables and a gatehouse/gardener's cottage, is still extant having been purchased by the University of Vermont in 1921 as an adjunct campus outside of Burlington. According to the National Register of Historic Places, Burdett's three Redstone estate buildings "represent the best examples of the Richardsonian Romanesque style of architecture in Burlington," other than Richardson's own Billings Library at the university. The Redstone complex was well documented at the time of its construction c.1889-91, with Marling & Burdett's perspective views featured in trade journals such as Architecture and Building. Drawings for Redstone were also exhibited by Marling & Burdett at the Architectural League of New York in 1890.

== Competitions ==
In addition to their private client work, Marling & Burdett also engaged in speculative architectural competitions for public buildings in Buffalo and in Canada. Though their competition entries were often commended, they were never outright winners. Burdett himself had some small success with competitions prior to his partnership with Marling – in 1886 he was one of recipients of a $50 premium for his designs for a house that could be built for under $5000 featured in The American Architect and Building News.

Marling & Burdett entered at least three major competitions around 1890. One, for the Continental life Assurance Company's new premises in Montreal is shrouded in obscurity, yet the others were well recorded in architectural press of the day. Another Canadian competition was for the Confederation Life building at Yonge, Victoria and Richmond Streets in Toronto (with no fewer than four of the firm's drawings featured in Architecture and Building in August 1890). The other high-profile competition entered by Marling & Burdett in early 1890 was for the Erie County Savings Bank in downtown Buffalo. The design ultimately selected by judge Richard Morris Hunt was provided by architect George B. Post of New York City, but Marling & Burdett were commended for having submitted the best design among the thirteen Buffalo-based firms engaged in the competition. The Buffalo Evening News credited Marling & Burdett's Romanesque design as being "graceful and appropriate."

Probably the last competition entered by the firm was for the Church of the Messiah at North and Mariner Streets in Buffalo, the result for which were announced in March 1891, only weeks before Burdett died. Ironically, the architectural expert judging this competition was none other than George B. Post.

== Practice ==
In addition to running their practice, J. H. Marling and Herbert Burdett also managed to find time to engage in other aspects of the profession, not only exhibiting their drawings at the Architectural League of New York and the American Institute of Architects, but also corresponding with the local and trade press on such matters as the fireproofing of buildings, removing oil stains from Corsehill sandstone and the need for architects to raise the standard of school design.

Marling and Burdett also engaged in a press campaign by nearly one hundred American architects "to protest against the terms of improper conditions of competition" in the proposed extension to the Massachusetts State House in 1889

== Premature death ==
On April 10, 1891, Herbert Channing Burdett died "from those joint terrors of heart disease and pneumonia" after a short illness. He was widely eulogized in the local and the trade press at the time, with The Buffalo Courier noting that "in him Buffalo loses a brilliant member of his profession, whose keen artistic taste had already done much for the enrichment of the city and promised to do far more."

In a similar vein, The Buffalo Times stated that with Burdett's death, "the city loses a bright and promising young architect, a man much esteemed by every one who formed his acquaintance." His hometown paper in Worcester County, Massachusetts noted what the young architect accomplished in a short career: "As a designer he ranked high and his work had become well known in the section of the country where he lived. He had designed several large buildings which stand as creditable monuments to his life. His services were sought by men of affluence and he was gaining high rank as an architect."

Burdett's death was also noted in the national architectural press, with the Chicago-based journal The Inland Architect describing him as "a young architect of exceptional ability and great promise.". The American Architect and Building News learned of Burdett's untimely passing "with great regret" and noted that soon after partnering with J. H. Marling, the firm "soon obtained a high reputation for clever and original work." The journal went on to state that the death of Burdett "will be greatly regretted, not only in Buffalo, but among architects throughout the country."

Burdett's professional colleagues in the Buffalo chapter of the American Institute of Architects also recorded that they had "suffered a severe loss in the death of Mr H. C. Burdett ... one of the brightest and most capable young men in his profession, and his death cast a gloom over the entire Chapter."

After his death, Burdett's remains were transported to Leominster where a funeral service was held on October 14 at his parents' house at 8 Grove Avenue – located directly behind the house he designed for his brother a few years before.

== Personality and character ==
Herbert Burdett was remembered as "a refined, kindly-natured man, fond of music and engrossed in his art." The American Architect and Building News commented that although Burdett was "of a quiet and thoughtful disposition, he was very popular in and out of the profession." With the death of Burdett, stated The Buffalo Courier, the city "loses an amiable and scholarly man who held a warm place in the regard of those privileged to know him."

Burdett's friends and colleagues noted that "as in all the habits of his life he was methodical, painstaking, proceeding with care to a knowledge of the principles and groundwork of his subject. His characteristics were perseverance, enthusiasm, generosity, and modesty." His partner Marling recalled Burdett being "a most diligent student, a fine pianist, and refined and artistic in all his tastes."

Herbert Burdett never married, and died at the home he shared for four years with J. H. Marling at 432 Pearl Street in Buffalo.

== Known works ==
Building Type	Image	Location	Client	Date(s)	Status	Notes	Source(s)
House		776 Delaware Ave, Buffalo, NY	William H Gratwick	1886-89	Demolished	HH Richardson design, completion supervised on site by Burdett on behalf of Shepley, Rutan & Coolidge	
House		390 Linwood Ave, Buffalo, NY	Thomas P. Bissell	1886?	Extant	Original design by Silsbee & Marling completed by Marling & Burdett?	
House		405 Linwood Ave, Buffalo, NY	W. Perry Taylor	1887	Extant	Original design by Silsbee & Marling completed by Marling & Burdett?	
House		417 Linwood Ave, Buffalo, NY	Frederick H Stevens	1887	Extant	Plans filed by Marling & Burdett 1 Nov 1887	
House		420 Linwood Ave, Buffalo, NY	Bright Tabor	1887	Extant	Original design by Silsbee & Marling completed by Marling & Burdett?	
Exhibition buildings		Hamlin Park, Buffalo, NY	International Fair Committee	1888-89	Demolished	Marling & Burdett responsible for main building and some ancillary exhibition buildings	
House		844 Delaware Ave, Buffalo, NY	Jewett M Richmond	1888	Extant	Well-documented interior. Home of Child & Family Services	
Church		96 Jewett Parkway, Buffalo, NY	Church of the Good Shepherd	1887-88	Extant	Reworked Silsbee & Marling design	
House		1058 Delaware Ave, Buffalo, NY	William Hamlin	1888-89	Demolished	House and Stable block: £125,000 cost	
Stables		1058 Delaware Ave, Buffalo, NY	William Hamlin	1888-89	Demolished	Stable block £10,000 cost	
House		67 Orchard Street, Leominster, MA	William C Burdett	1888	Extant	Built by H C Burdett for younger brother	
House		283 Summer Street, Buffalo, NY	Risley Tucker	1889	Extant	$9,000 cost	
House		354 Fargo Ave, Buffalo, NY	George W Carter	1889	Extant	$9,000 cost	
House		367 Elmwood Ave, Buffalo, NY	John B Greene	1889	Demolished	$15,000 cost	
House		Delaware Ave, Buffalo, NY	Miss Elizabeth Gates	1889	Never built	$75,000 scheme abandoned and site sold by 1890	
House		33 Linwood Ave, Buffalo, NY	George Coit	1889	Demolished	$15,000 cost	
House		65 Ashland Ave, Buffalo, NY	Mott Pierce	1889	Extant	$8,000 cost	
House		"Rushingwater", Aurora, Erie County, NY	William C. Cornwell	1889	Demolished (Note: The Century Map Company's 1909 Erie County Atlas locates Cornwell's property just above the junction of the two branches of Cazenovia Creek just west of the village of East Aurora, which agrees with the description of its location in the 1897 Buffalo Morning Express article cited previously. There are currently no buildings on that site.)	$10,000 cost	
House		7 Acacia St, Cambridge, MA	W.K. Blodgett, Jr	1889	Extant	Latterly enlarged and altered	
House		209 Vansittart Ave, Woodstock, Ontario	John D Patterson	1889	Unknown	$5,000 cost. With brother Arthur in family firm of agricultural implement manufacturers	
House		Light St, Woodstock, Ontario	Arthur S. Patterson	1889	Unknown	$6,000 cost. Client emigrated to Australia by 1910	
House		Light St, Woodstock, Ontario	John Arthur	1889	Unknown	Site not traced	
Commercial premises		Toronto, Ontario	Confederation Life building	1889	Not built	Unsuccessful competition entry (fourth place)	
Private Clubhouse		417 Delaware Avenue, Buffalo, NY	Saturn Club	1889-90	Destroyed by fire	Superseded by new premises in 1921	
House		"Redstone," South Prospect Road, Burlington, VT	Andrew A. Buell	1889-91	Extant	House $25,000 cost; stables & outbuildings $15,000. Purchased by University of Vermont in 1921	
Stables		"Redstone," South Prospect Road, Burlington, VT	Andrew A. Buell	1889-91	Extant	Stables & outbuildings $15,000 cost. Purchased by University of Vermont in 1921	
Gate lodge		"Redstone," South Prospect Road, Burlington, VT	Andrew A. Buell	1889-91	Extant	Stables & outbuildings $15,000 cost. Purchased by University of Vermont in 1921	
House		368 Linwood Ave, Buffalo, NY	Spencer S Kingsley	1890	Extant	Of Kingsley & Potter, real estate	
Commercial premises		Niagara & Pearl Sts, Buffalo	Erie County Savings Bank	1890	Not built	Top-ranked of thirteen local entries	
Church		North & Mariner Sts, Buffalo, NY	Church of the Messiah	1891	Not built	Unsuccessful competition entry	
House		"Lake Shore House," near Buffalo, NY	Unknown	1891	Unknown	Site not traced	
Commercial premises		Montreal, Quebec	Continental Life Assurance	n.d.	Not built	Unsuccessful competition entry	
House		"Elmstone", Seventh Street at Connecticut Street, Buffalo, NY	George H Lewis	c.1891	Demolished	Dates to be confirmed	
