= Saturn Club =

- U.S. National Register of Historic Places
- New York State Register of Historic Places
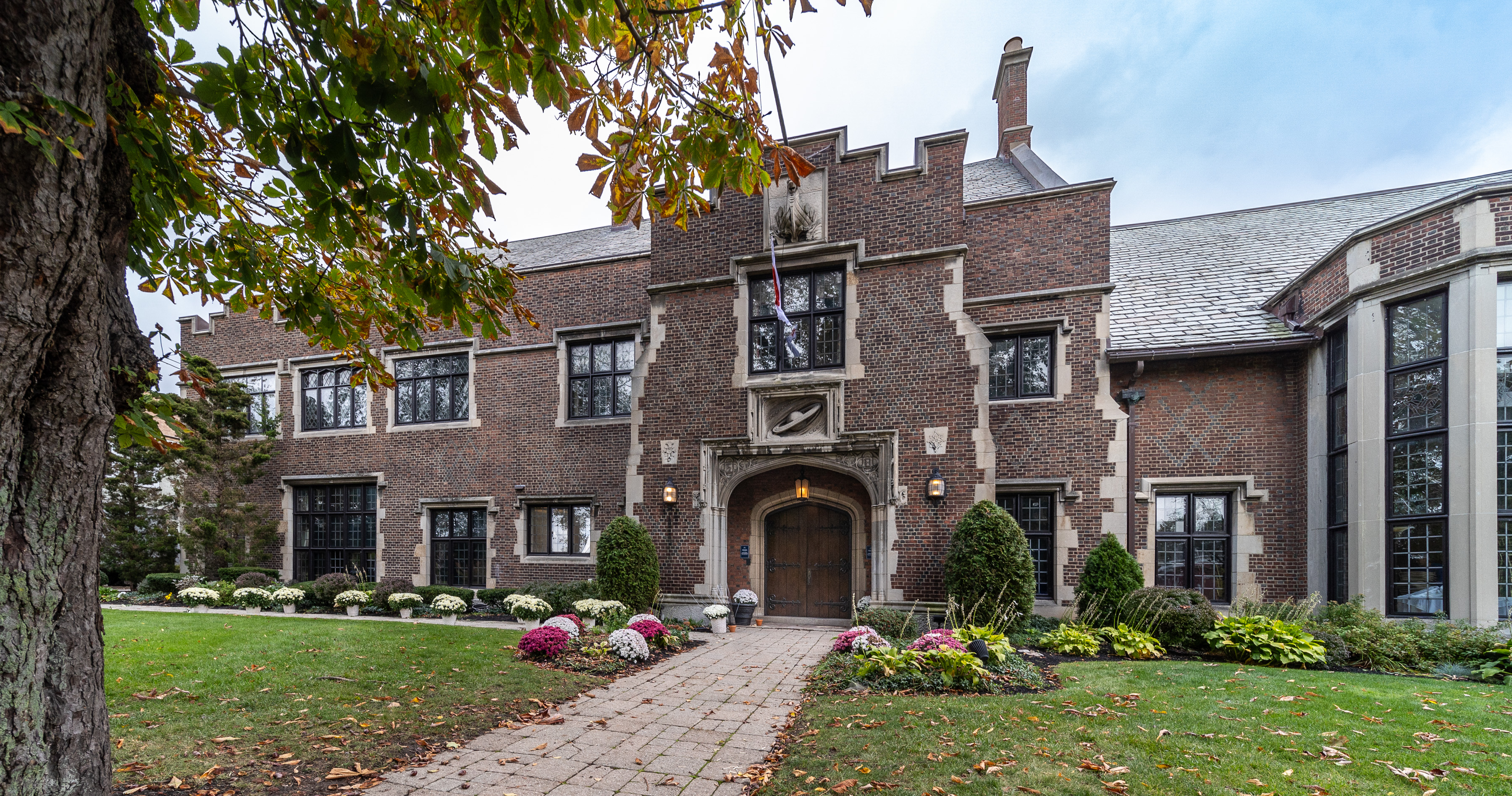

- Location within New York Location within the United States
- Location: 977 Delaware Ave., Buffalo, New York
- Coordinates: 42°54′38″N 78°52′13″W
- Area: 1.7 acres (0.69 ha)
- Built: 1922
- Architects: Bley & Lyman; Williams, Harry
- Architectural style: Tudor Revival
- NRHP reference No.: 05000444
- NYSRHP No.: 02940.001736

Significant dates
- Added to NRHP: May 19, 2005
- Designated NYSRHP: March 25, 2005

Saturn Club is a private social club founded in 1885 in Buffalo in Erie County, New York, United States. It currently operates out of an National Register of Historic Places-listed building at 977 Delaware Avenue in Buffalo.

== Operations ==
It operates under US law for 501(c)(7) Social and Recreation Clubs. In 2025 it claimed total revenue of $1,947,375 and total assets of $3,601,137. The separate and related Saturn Club Historic Preservation Foundation is a 501(c)(3) Public Charity. In 2023 it claimed $62,322 in total revenue and $206,207 in total assets.

== History ==
In 1885, The Saturn Club was founded by thirteen young men who wanted to congregate in a less formal setting than their father's traditional clubs. The first three founders were: Carlton Sprague, William F. Kip, and Francis Almy. They recruited the ten others including John B. Olmsted and Ansley Wilcox. They first congregated on Saturdays, hence the name, to socialize and play cards. Dues were US$10 (equivalent to about $358 in 2025) a month, and the initiation fee was a chair. With a nod to the many "University Clubs" of the time, Saturn's founders patterned their board of directors after that of a small college, including:

- Faculty
- Dean
- Registrar
- Bursar

Initially, the members met in a house owned by Sprague's grandfather but by 1886, the members decided to rent three rooms at the rear of a dwelling at 640 Main Street. In 1887, they moved to another rented house, a small Second Empire style home at 331 Delaware Avenue, before relocating to a larger, Italianate cottage at 393 Delaware Avenue, opposite the Buffalo Club.

In 1889, the club and its 150 members formally incorporated in Erie County and decided to construct their own building. By February, the directors had purchased a lot, 417 Delaware Avenue, at the southeast corner of Delaware Avenue and Edward Streets, not far from the Buffalo Club. On this site, they constructed a three-story brick building, designed by Herbert C Burdett of the Buffalo firm of Marling & Burdett. The building was dedicated on December 13, 1890.

Beginning in the 1890s, the club added baseball games, lectures, costume balls, and vaudeville shows to the club's programming. A library was initiated and debates were held on the important issues of the time. These debates often included participation with other area clubs, including the Buffalo Club, the University Club, and the Garret Club.

In 1900, then Gov. Theodore Roosevelt visited and had dinner at the club during his visit to Buffalo.

In 1985, women were officially admitted as full members, however, in the immediate years preceding the change, women had full use of the club, through a relationship with the Garret Club, as well as through their spouses or other connections.

=== 1922 building ===
In December 1920, only 30 years after the original building's dedication, a new building committee suggested selling the existing clubhouse and erecting a new building elsewhere. Club member Duane Lyman, of Bley & Lyman, was asked to develop new plans for a clubhouse along with Ralph Plumb, a club member. The club purchased property at 977 Delaware Avenue and approved Lyman's plans for the present day Tudor style building, by February 1921.

On October 21, 1921, the cornerstone of the new building was laid and exactly one year later, on October 21, 1922, the clubhouse was dedicated. The Tudor Revival structure featured an enclosed open courtyard. By completion, the project ended up totaling US$500,000 (equivalent to $9,617,296 in 2025).

The building was listed on the National Register of Historic Places in 2005.

=== Renovations ===
In 2002, the club underwent a $1 million (equivalent to $1,790,000 in 2025) renovation that added two squash courts as well as general upgrades to its athletic facilities. The Saturn Club already had one international regulation doubles court and two singles courts. The new courts allow the club to host competitions. The other renovation work includes improvements to both the men's and women's locker rooms and the addition of exercise equipment. Hamilton Houston Lownie Architects, PC designed the additions and Integrated Realty & Development Corp. served as construction manager.

In 2014, the interior was remodeled by Michael Donnelly Interiors and focused on two rooms: The Delaware Room and The Red Room. The Red Room features a fireplace and is accented by dark wood paneling along with a rich red covering. Panel draperies with 12-inch-wide, red fabric bands were added to frame the leaded windows. New furniture, chandelier covers and brown paisley carpeting with a red background were also added. The Delaware Room has a more clean look showcasing the oversized historic wall panels that depict seaside life. The fabrics are striped with blues and beiges that are intended to complement the murals.

== Prohibition ==
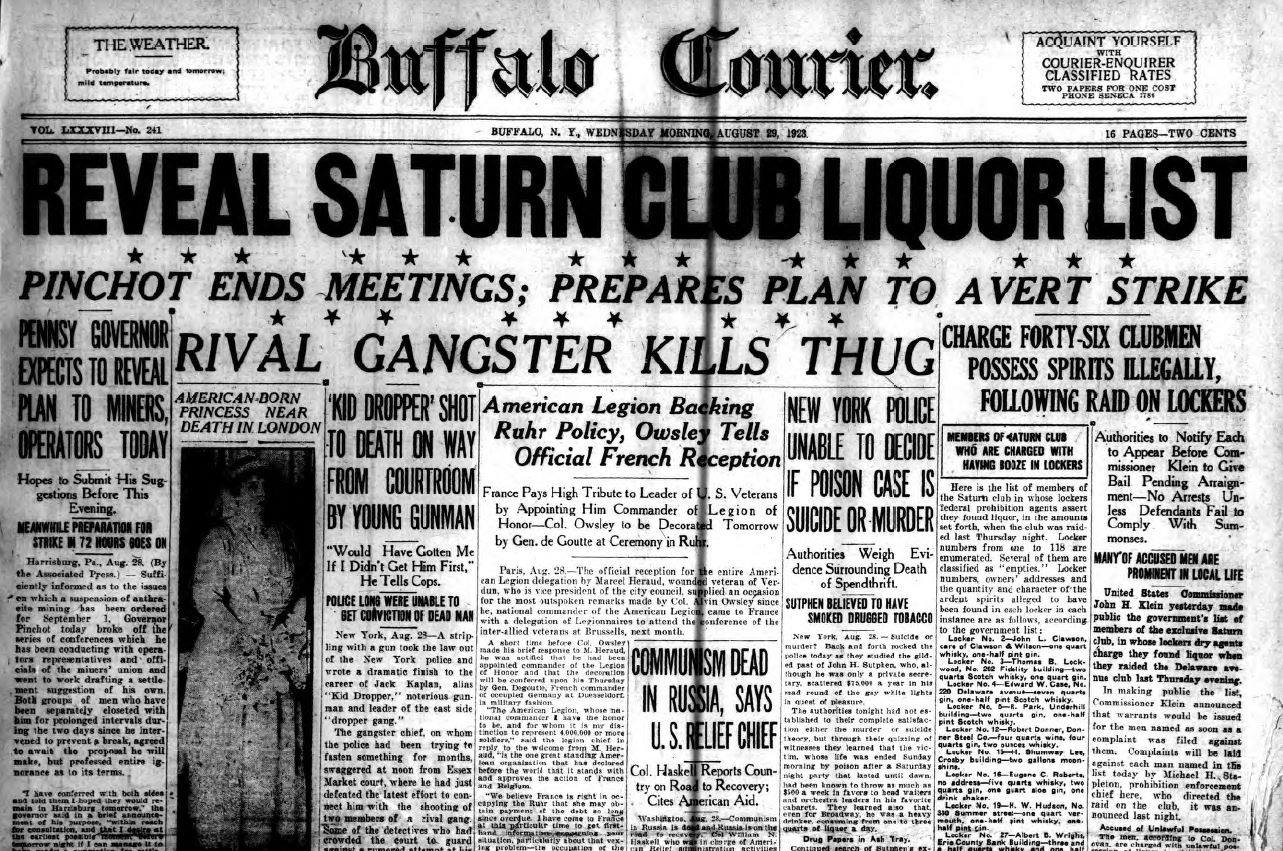
Front page of the Buffalo Courier from August 29, 1923

During the early years of Prohibition, Saturn had a bar and a bartender, but did not provide drinks. On advice from its lawyers, members could keep items, unquestioned, in private lockers and order all the ingredients for a drink, without spirits, to be passed into the club's rooms through a small sliding door.

On August 29, 1923, Federal agents under William J. Donovan, who himself was a member of the club, raided both the Saturn Club and the Country Club of Buffalo. Agents found at least sixty quarts of whisky, a similar amount of gin, five gallons of moonshine, bottles of champagne, vermouth, and other liquors inside the organization's lockers, according to court documents. The chair of the club's house committee told reporters the night of the raid that the liquor “evidently was smuggled in by bootlegging employees of the club.”

A listing of those charged with dry law violations was published in the newspaper After the names were published, the members and the club had little option but to agree to a settlement and do away with the sliding doors.

== Notable members ==
Notable former members of Saturn Club include:

- Robert B. Adam, founder of AM&A's department store
- John J. Albright, industrialist, philanthropist, and namesake of the Albright Knox Art Gallery
- Owen Augspurger, civic leader
- George K. Birge, owner of M. H. Birge & Sons Co., director of the 1901 Pan-American Exposition, and president of Pierce-Arrow Motor Car Company
- Lawrence Bell, aerospace entrepreneur, founder of Bell Aircraft
- Edward H. Butler, Jr., publisher of the Buffalo Evening News
- Stephen Merrell Clement, president of Marine Bank
- William J. Conners II, publisher of the Buffalo Courier-Express
- William J. Conners III, publisher of the Buffalo Courier-Express
- William J. Donovan, soldier, lawyer, intelligence officer and diplomat
- Robert Donner, Donner Steel Company
- John T. Elfvin, federal judge
- Harold M. Esty, Jr., president of Buffalo China
- E.B. Green, Jr., architect
- George V. Forman ■
- Burt P. Flickinger, Jr., entrepreneur, philanthropist, organizer of the 1993 World University Games
- William A. Gardner ■
- Bradley J. Gaylord ■
- Anson Goodyear, founder and first president of the Museum of Modern Art, president of Great Southern Lumber, director of Paramount Pictures
- Charles W. Goodyear, founder and head of numerous rail lines
- George F. Goodyear, board president of the Buffalo Museum of Science, founder of WGRZ-TV, Saturn Club historian
- William B. Hoyt, politician
- Thomas B. Lockwood, candidate for Lt. Governor in 1914
- Duane Lyman, architect ■
- Edward A Kent, owner of Flint & Kent
- Irvine J. Kittinger, Jr., proprietor of the Kittinger Company
- Northrup R. Knox, co-founder of the Buffalo Sabres
- Seymour H. Knox, businessman ■
- Seymour H. Knox III, co-founder of the Buffalo Sabres
- Dr. Baldwin Mann ■
- Edward McGinley III, Wharton graduate
- John R. Oishei, founder of Trico
- John Olmsted, landscape architect, nephew and adopted son of Frederick Law Olmsted
- Roswell Park, founder of Roswell Park Comprehensive Cancer Center
- Ralph Plumb ■
- Theodore M. Pomeroy ■
- Peter A. Porter, Jr. ■
- Ansley Wilcox Sawyer, industrialist ■
- George F. Rand, president of Marine Midland Bank
- Ira G. Ross, scientist, engineer, leader of Calspan
- Dexter P. Rumsey, tannery owner, real estate entrepreneur
- William G. Schoellkopf ■
- Ralph H. Sidway ■
- Frank St. John Sidway, lawyer and National Guard leader and candidate for Lt. Governor in 1914
- John E. Selkirk ■
- Clarence Sidway ■
- Carlton Sprague, lawyer, politician, and chancellor of the University of Buffalo
- Harlan J. Swift, president of Erie County Savings Bank
- George P. Urban, miller, entrepreneur and director of numerous Buffalo corporations
- Henry Z. Urban, publisher of the Buffalo News
- James D. Warren, publisher of the Buffalo Commercial Advertiser
- Shelton Weed ■
- Ansley Wilcox, scholar, Oxford graduate, lawyer, and civil service reform commissioner
- Harry D. Williams ■
- Seymour White ■

■ Indicates that the individual was named in the newspaper during the 1923 raid
