= Richmond Avenue Methodist-Episcopal Church =

Historic church in New York, United States

- U.S. National Register of Historic Places
- U.S. Historic district – Contributing property
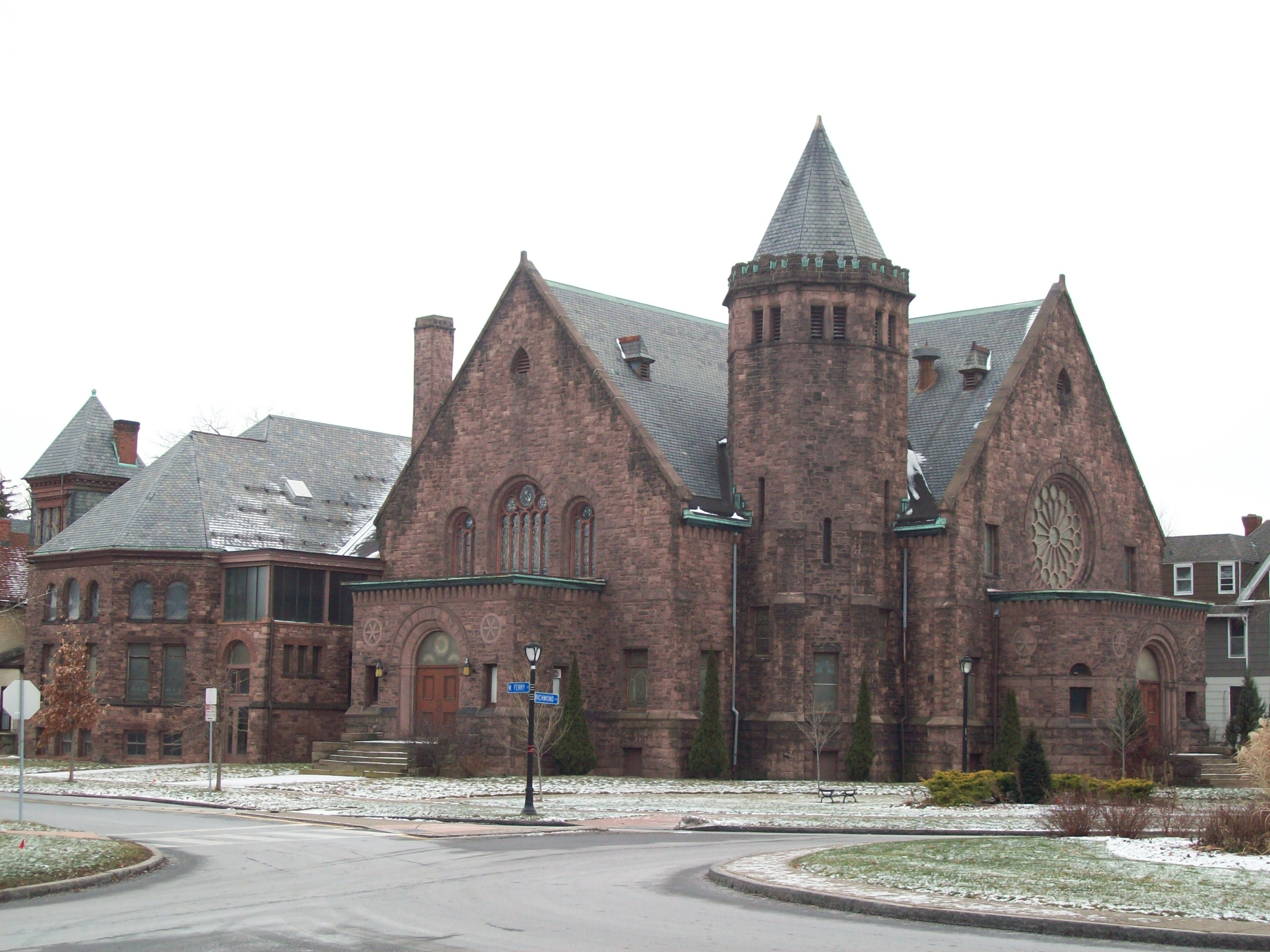
- Richmond Avenue Methodist-Episcopal Church, December 2009

- Location within New York Location within the United States
- Location: 525 W. Ferry St., Buffalo, New York
- Coordinates: 42°54′54″N 78°52′53″W
- Area: 1 acre (0.40 ha)
- Built: 1885
- Architect: Metzger and Greenfield; et al.
- Architectural style: Late 19th And 20th Century Revivals, Norman Revival
- NRHP reference No.: 08001143
- Added to NRHP: December 05, 2008

Richmond Avenue Methodist-Episcopal Church, also known as Richmond Avenue United Methodist Church, is a historic Methodist Episcopal Church located at Buffalo in Erie County, New York. It consists of two structures: a rectilinear Chapel structure, which dates to 1885–1891, and a larger Temple structure dating to 1887–1898. Both structures are two and a half stories set on a raised basement story, with two three-story towers. They are built of ashlar Medina sandstone. It is now home to the Upper West Side Arts Center.

It was listed on the National Register of Historic Places in 2008. It is located in the Elmwood Historic District–West.
