= One M&T Plaza =

Skyscraper in Buffalo, New York

M&T Bank Plaza
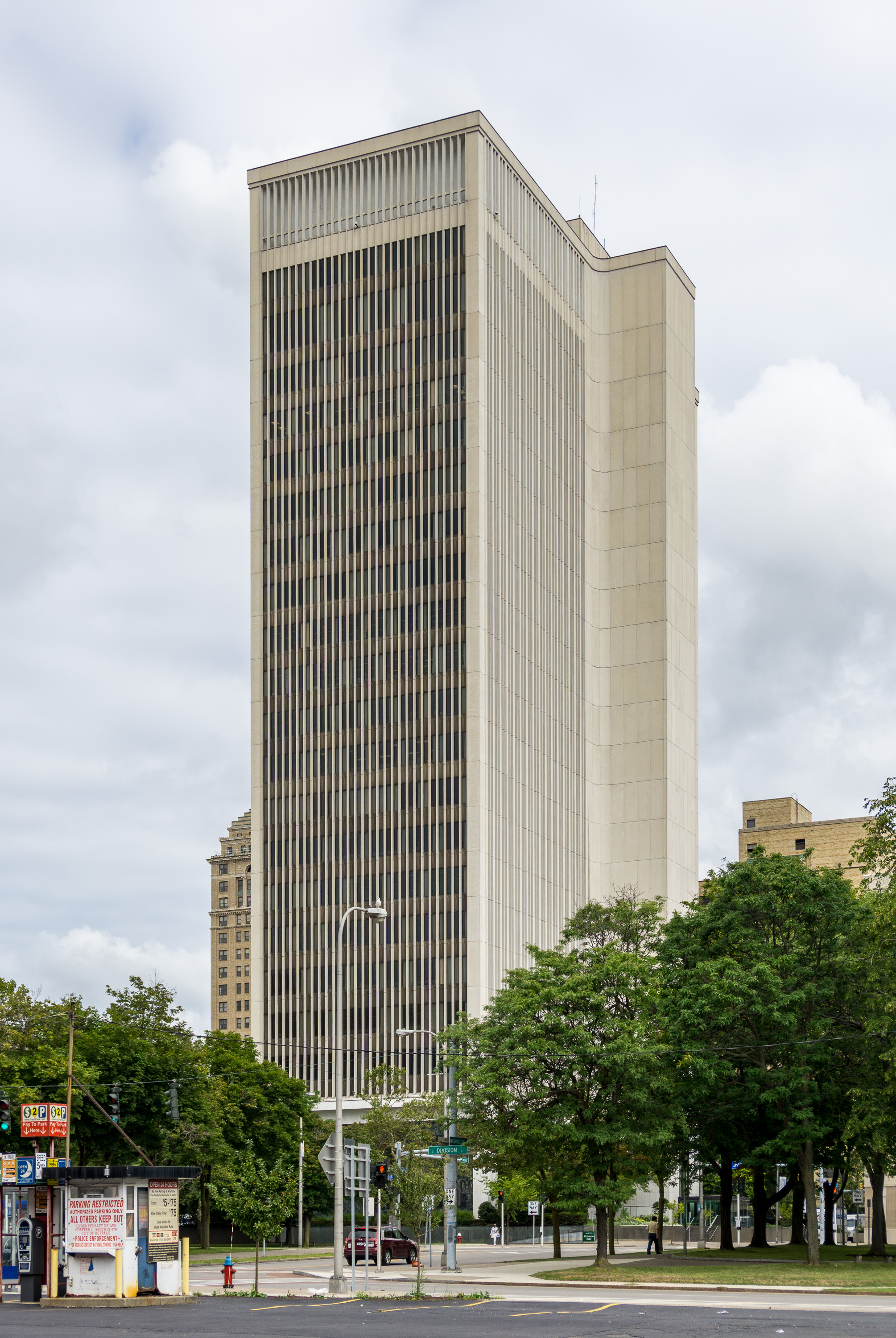
- One M&T Plaza, in Buffalo, New York

General information
- Status: Completed
- Type: Office
- Location: 1 M&T Plaza; Buffalo, New York, U.S.
- Coordinates: 42.8838°N 78.8742°W
- Construction started: June 16, 1965
- Completed: May 15, 1967
- Cost: US$ 16 million

Height
- Roof: 97.0 m (318.2 ft)

Technical details
- Floor count: 21
- Floor area: 80,000 m^{2} (860,000 sq ft)
- Lifts/elevators: 9

Design and construction
- Architect: Minoru Yamasaki
- Structural engineer: Worthington, Skilling, Helle & Jackson

One M&T Plaza is an office tower located in Buffalo, New York and home to M&T Bank in Erie County. The 21-story International style or New Formalist office tower was designed by Minoru Yamasaki with Duane Lyman Associates and completed in 1967. The structural steel for the building was produced locally by Bethlehem Steel, and was a product of their V50 grade. The base of the building is composed of white and green marble with an interior of travertine. The building also features a 75-by-225 foot exterior plaza.

== History ==
Three notable buildings existed on the current site prior to One M&T Plaza. These included:

- The Richmond Hotel (1887–1888)
- Iroquois Hotel, also known as the Gerrans building (1889–1940)
- Bond Clothing Company Building (1940–1964)

== See also ==
- List of tallest buildings in Buffalo, New York
- Buffalo Savings Bank building

== Gallery ==
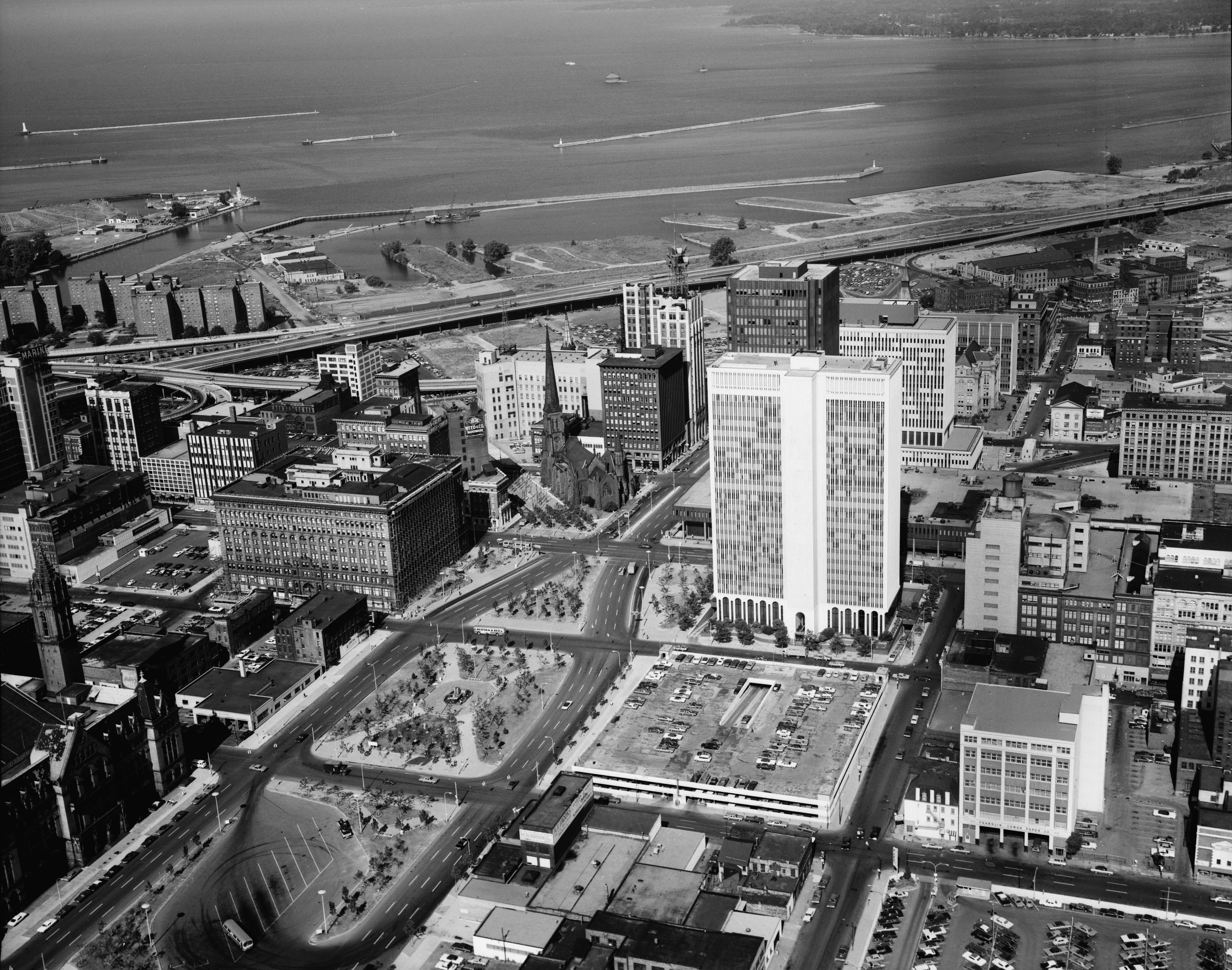
July 1971

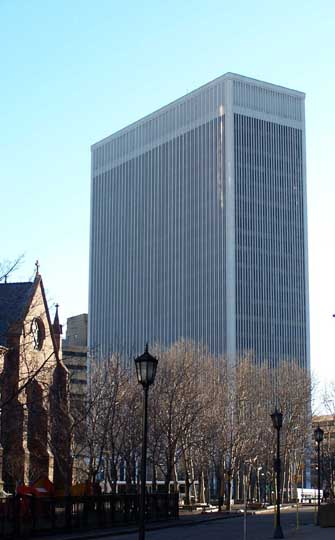
April 2008

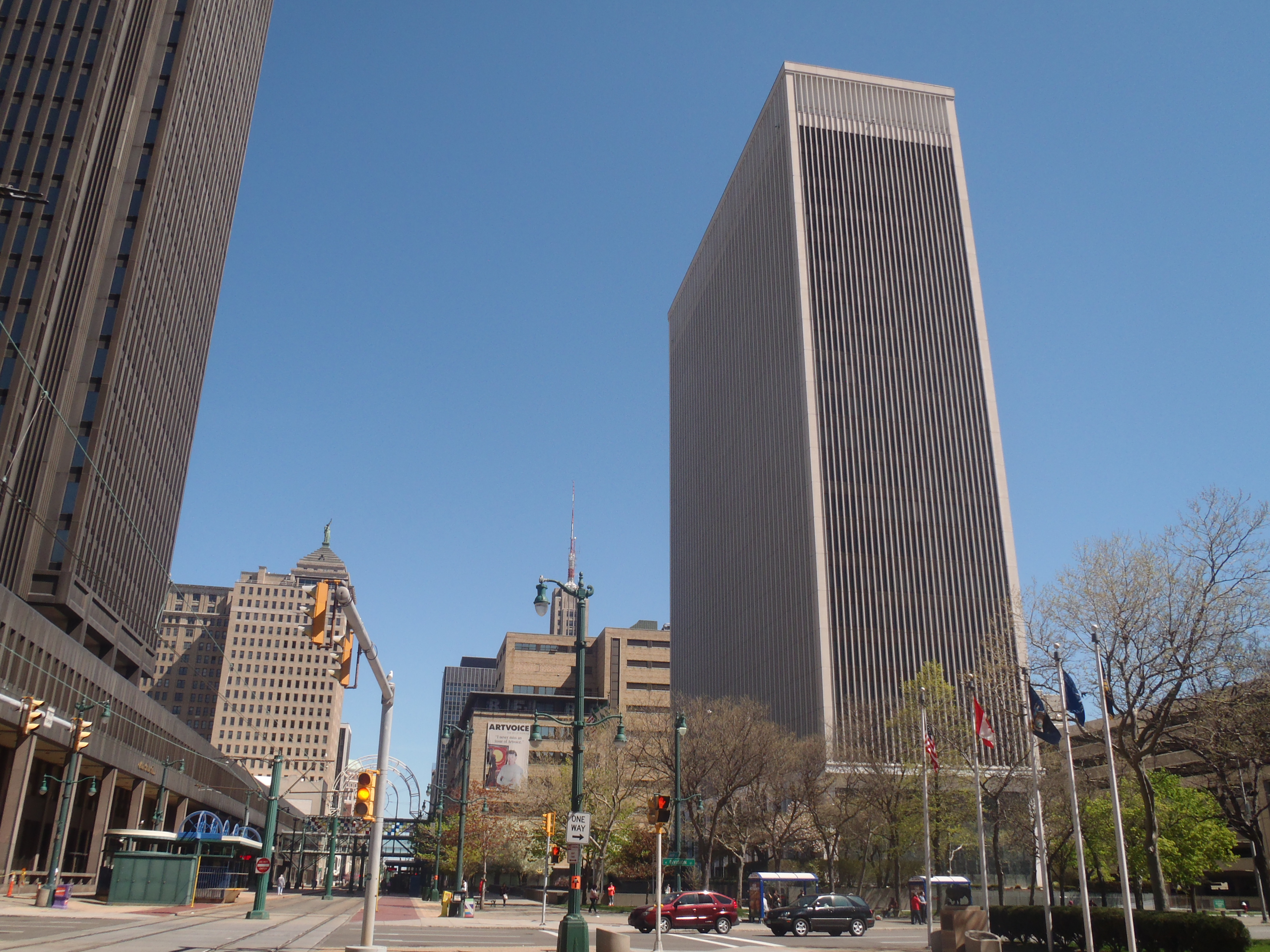
May 2013

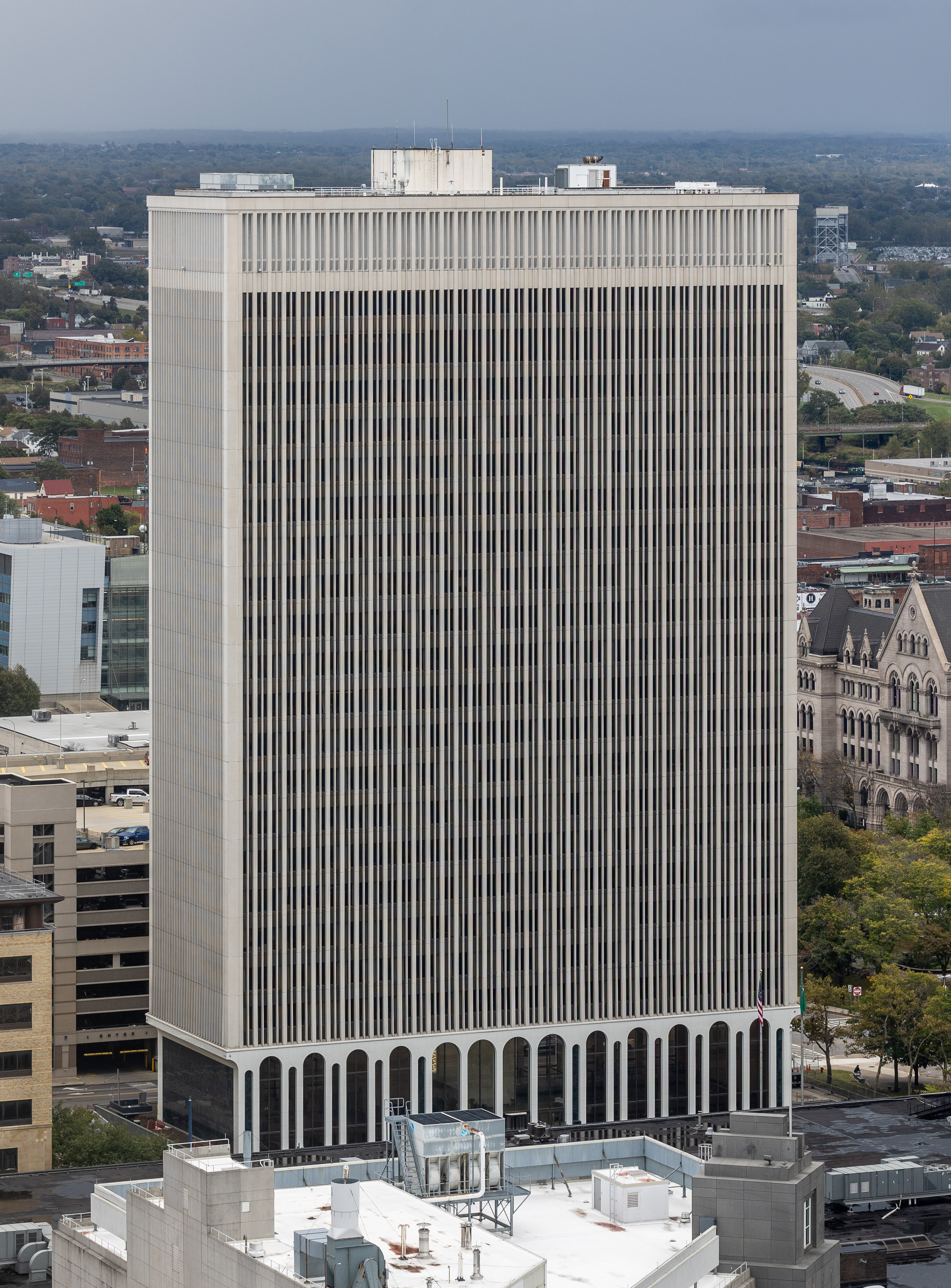
View of One M&T Plaza from atop Buffalo City Hall, October 2023
