= Duane Lyman =

American architect

- Born: September 9, 1886; Lockport, New York, US
- Died: April 30, 1966 (aged 79); Buffalo, New York, US
- Education: Yale University (1908)
- Occupation: Architect
- Spouse: Elizabeth Stimson
- Children: 3
- Practice: Lansing Bley & Lyman (1912-1919), Bley & Lyman (1919-ca. 1939), Lyman & Associates (ca. 1939-1966)
- Buildings: Saturn Club, Country Club of Buffalo, Johnston House, M&T Bank Center

Duane Lyman (1886–1966) was an architect based in Buffalo, New York, known for his prolific career which included 100 school buildings, many churches, and numerous large homes both in the city and suburban communities. At the time of his death, Lyman was referred to as the "dean of Western New York Architecture."

== Early life ==
Lyman was born in Lockport, New York, the son of Richard B. and Molly Hayes Lyman. He attended Lafayette High School in Buffalo and in 1908, graduated from Yale University's Sheffield Scientific School, where he studied architecture and mechanical engineering.

== Career ==
After graduating in 1908, he traveled abroad to Europe, staying until 1913 and the eve of World War I. He returned to the United States, settling in Buffalo and started an architecture practice. He was partners in three firms: Lansing Bley & Lyman (1912–1919), Bley & Lyman (1919–ca. 1939), and Lyman & Associates (ca. 1939–1966). Lyman volunteered for military service during World War I, serving in the nation's capital, and left with the rank of major.

Some of Lyman's papers survive in the collection of the Buffalo History Museum.

=== Selected works ===
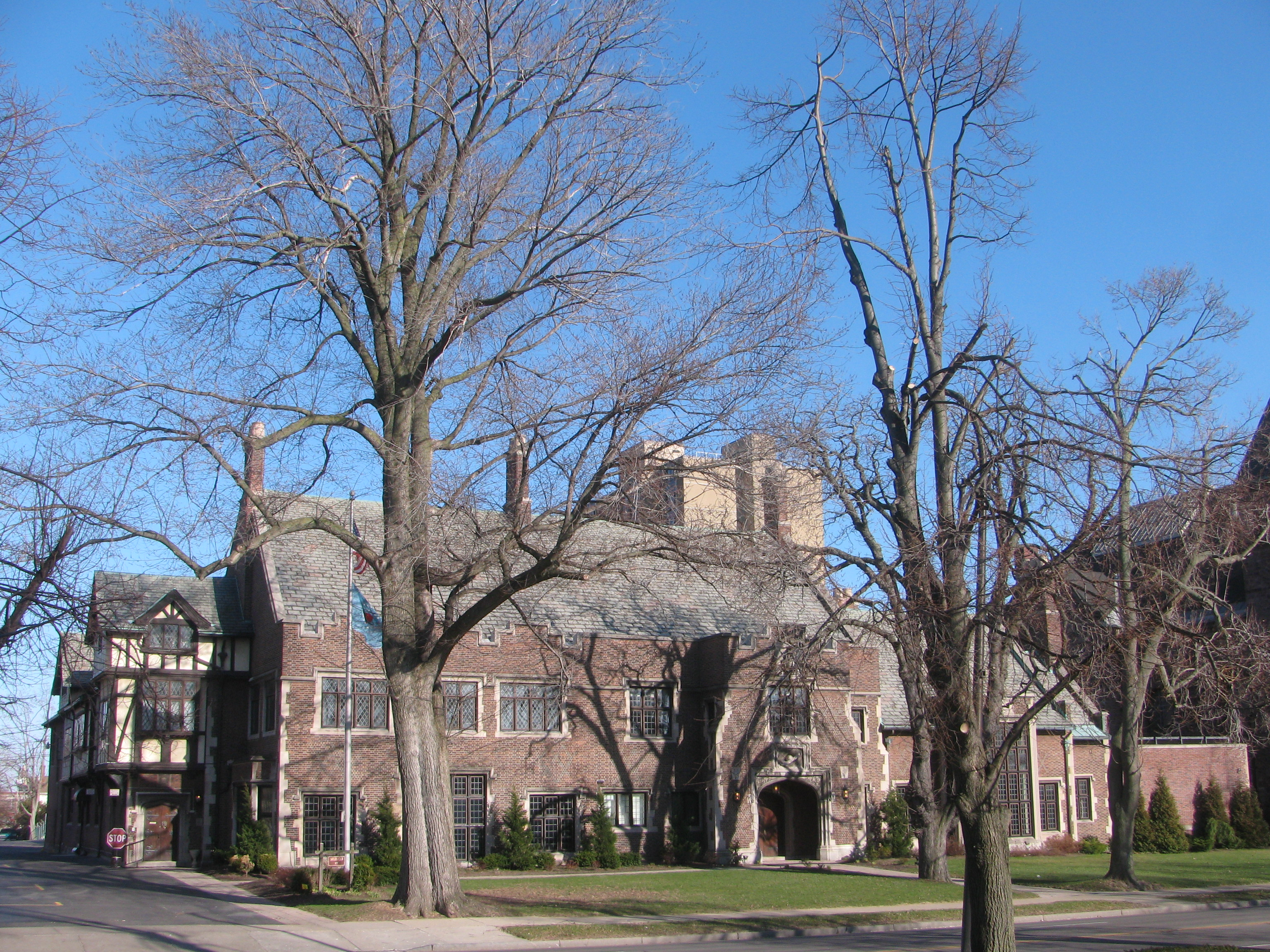
Saturn Club, Buffalo, New York.

- Vars Mausoleum at Forest Lawn Cemetery
- 1915: Bert Lee Jones Residence, Derby NY, 6980 Lakeshore Rd.
- 1922: Saturn Club, listed on the National Register of Historic Places in 2005.
- 1924: American Radiator Company Factory Complex, additions to the Institute of Thermal Research, Buffalo, New York
- 1927: Country Club of Buffalo clubhouse, Buffalo, New York
- 1929: Annie Lang Miller House (Nottingham), Buffalo, New York
- 1934: Edwin M. and Emily S. Johnston House, listed on the National Register of Historic Places in 1997.
- 1936: Federal Courthouse at Niagara Square, Buffalo, New York
- 1937: Old Trees (remodeling), Cazenovia, New York, listed on the National Register of Historic Places in 1991.
- 1950: Christ the King Chapel, Canisius College
- 1950: Williamsville Junior and Senior High School (now Williamsville South High School), Amherst, New York, listed on the National Register of Historic Places in 2008.
- 1957: House at 8 Berkley Drive, Lockport, New York, listed on the National Register of Historic Places in 2009.
- 1961: Liberty Building (addition)
- 1963: Diefendorf Hall, University at Buffalo, The State University of New York
- 1966: M&T Bank Center, Buffalo

== Personal life ==
In 1911, he married Elizabeth Stimson, with whom he had three daughters. Lyman hunted and fished on his near 100 acre farm near South Wales, in Western New York and Canada, fished in Florida and New Brunswick, Canada, and at his hunting and fishing lodge near Bic in Quebec (since 1955), where he was a member of the Anglo-American Fish & Game Club of Bic. He was also a member of the Saturn Club in Buffalo and a life member and director of the Buffalo Fine Arts Academy. Lyman died on April 30, 1966, at his home on 78 Oakland Place in Buffalo, which he designed and built in 1948. He was interred at Forest Lawn Cemetery, Buffalo.
