= Parke Apartments =

- U.S. National Register of Historic Places
- U.S. Historic district – Contributing property
- New York State Register of Historic Places
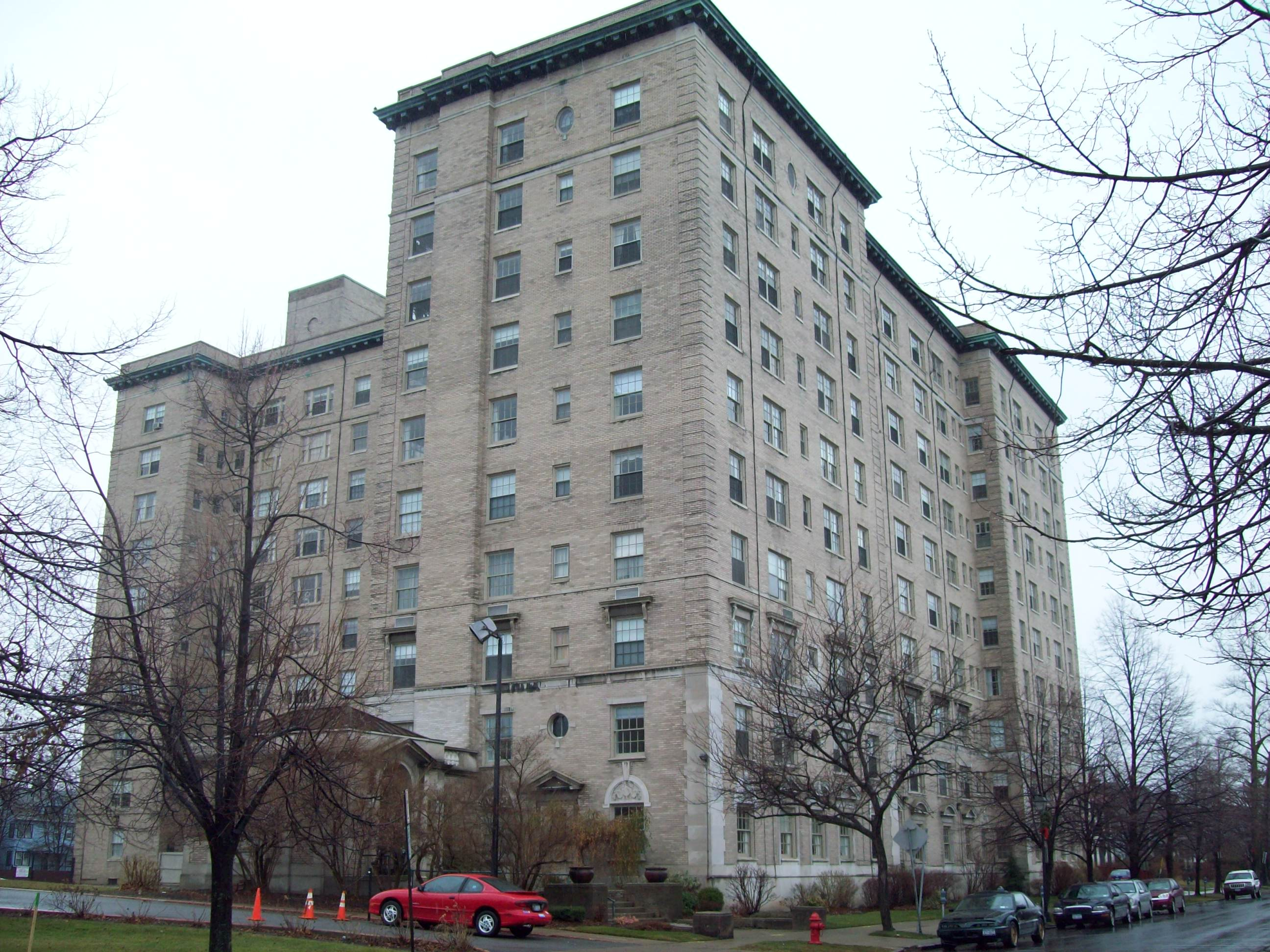
- Parke Apartments, December 2009

- Location within New York Location within the United States
- Location: 33 Gates Circle, Buffalo, New York
- Coordinates: 42°55′14″N 78°52′8″W
- Built: 1924
- Architect: Stevens, H.L. & Co.
- Architectural style: Renaissance
- NRHP reference No.: 07000492
- NYSRHP No.: 02940.009111

Significant dates
- Added to NRHP: May 30, 2007
- Designated NYSRHP: March 30, 2007

Parke Apartments, also known as Park Lane Condominium, is a historic apartment building located at Buffalo in Erie County, New York. It was designed and built in 1924–1925 by the H.L. Stevens & Company and is an early 20th-century high-class apartment building modestly styled in the Second Renaissance Revival mode. It is a ten-story, concrete-framed masonry building built of cream-colored brick with light stone detail in a T-shaped layout. Also on the property is a two-story former carriage house. It was converted from apartments to condominiums in 1977.

It was listed on the National Register of Historic Places in 2007. It is located in the Elmwood Historic District–East.

== Gallery ==
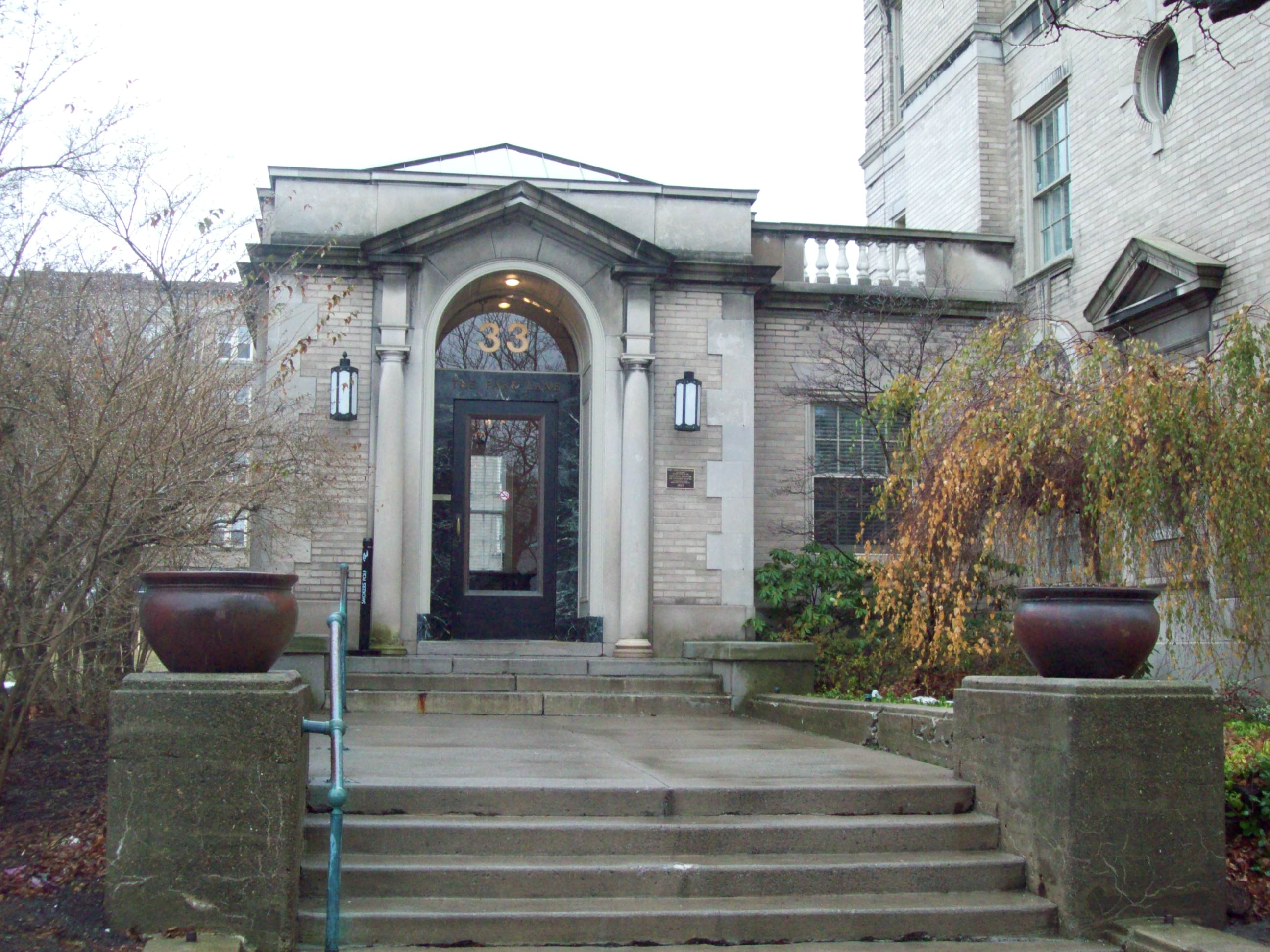
Parke Apartments Entrance Detail, December 2009
