= Old Trees =

Historic house in New York, United States

- U.S. National Register of Historic Places
- U.S. Historic district
- Location within New York Location within the United States
- Location: W side of Rippleton Rd., Cazenovia, New York
- Coordinates: 42°54′59″N 75°52′35″W
- Area: 168.2 acres (68.1 ha)
- Built: 1917
- Architect: Bley & Lyman; Lyman, Duane
- Architectural style: Colonial Revival, Bungalow/Craftsman, Georgian Revival
- MPS: Cazenovia Town MRA
- NRHP reference No.: 91000865
- Added to NRHP: July 15, 1991

Old Trees is a historic home and national historic district located at Cazenovia in Madison County, New York. The district contains four contributing buildings. The main house was built in 1917 as a large, two-story, rustic lodge. It was remodeled in 1937 in the Georgian Revival style by the prominent Buffalo firm of Bley and Lyman. Also on the property is a carriage house, guest cottage, and equipment barn; all were built about 1917.

It was added to the National Register of Historic Places in 1991.
