= Edwin M. and Emily S. Johnston House =

Historic house in New York, United States

- U.S. National Register of Historic Places
- U.S. Historic district – Contributing property
- New York State Register of Historic Places
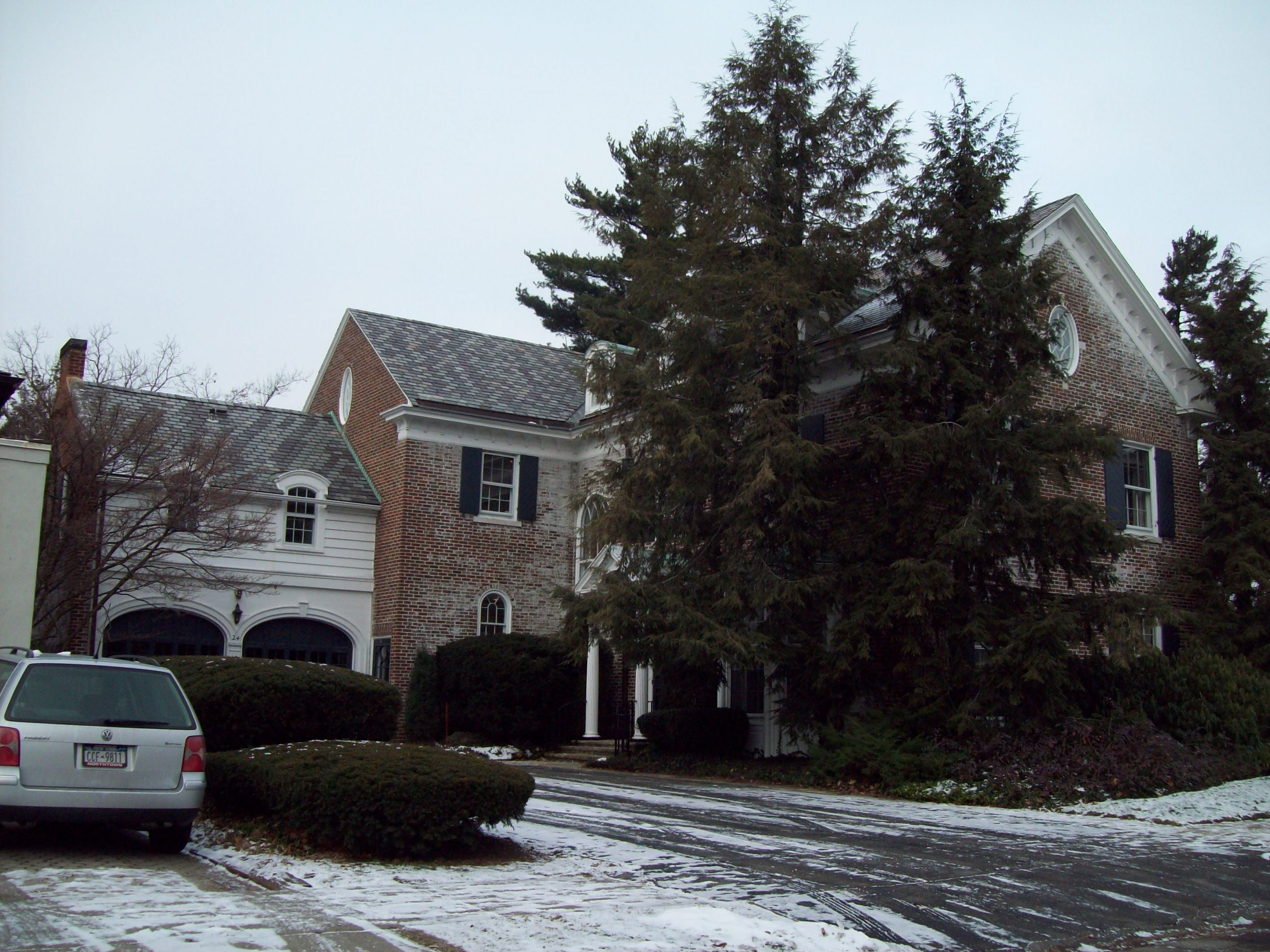
- Edwin M. and Emily S. Johnston House, December 2009

- Location within New York Location within the United States
- Location: 24 Tudor Pl., Buffalo, New York
- Coordinates: 42°55′1″N 78°52′30″W
- Area: 0.4 acres (0.16 ha)
- Built: 1934
- Architects: Bley & Lyman; Tuckenbrod, August S.
- Architectural style: Colonial Revival
- NRHP reference No.: 97000416
- NYSRHP No.: 02940.002757

Significant dates
- Added to NRHP: May 23, 1997
- Designated NYSRHP: April 2, 1997

Edwin M. and Emily S. Johnston House is a historic home located at Buffalo in Erie County, New York. It is a Colonial Revival style brick dwelling designed by Bley & Lyman in 1934. It consists of a 2 1/2-story cross-gabled main block with a 2-story side-gabled garage wing.

It was listed on the National Register of Historic Places in 1997. It is located in the Elmwood Historic District–East.
