= Edgar W. Howell House =

Historic house in New York, United States

- U.S. National Register of Historic Places
- U.S. Historic district – Contributing property
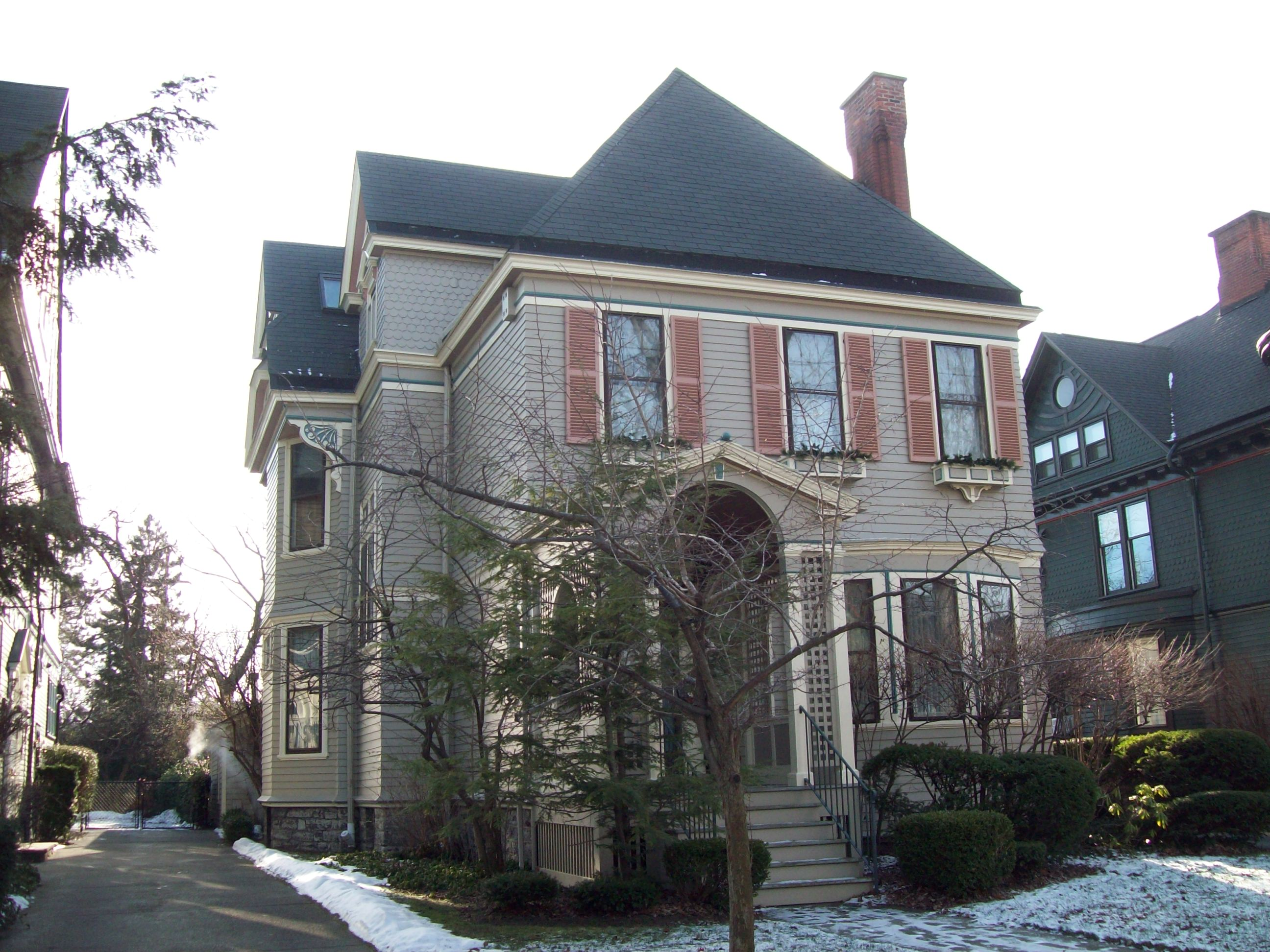
- Edgar W. Howell House, December 2009

- Location within New York Location within the United States
- Location: 52 Lexington Ave., Buffalo, New York
- Coordinates: 42°54′46″N 78°52′21″W
- Area: 0.2 acres (0.081 ha)
- Built: 1889
- Architectural style: Late Victorian, Free Classic; Eclectic
- NRHP reference No.: 07001203
- Added to NRHP: November 15, 2007

Edgar W. Howell House is a historic home located at Buffalo, Erie County, New York. It was built about 1889, and is a 2 1/2-story Late Victorian style frame dwelling with eclectic design elements. The three bay dwelling has a hipped roof and decorative entrance porch.

It was listed on the National Register of Historic Places in 2007. It is located in the Elmwood Historic District–East.
