= Col. William Kelly House =

Historic house in New York, United States

- U.S. National Register of Historic Places
- U.S. Historic district – Contributing property
- New York State Register of Historic Places
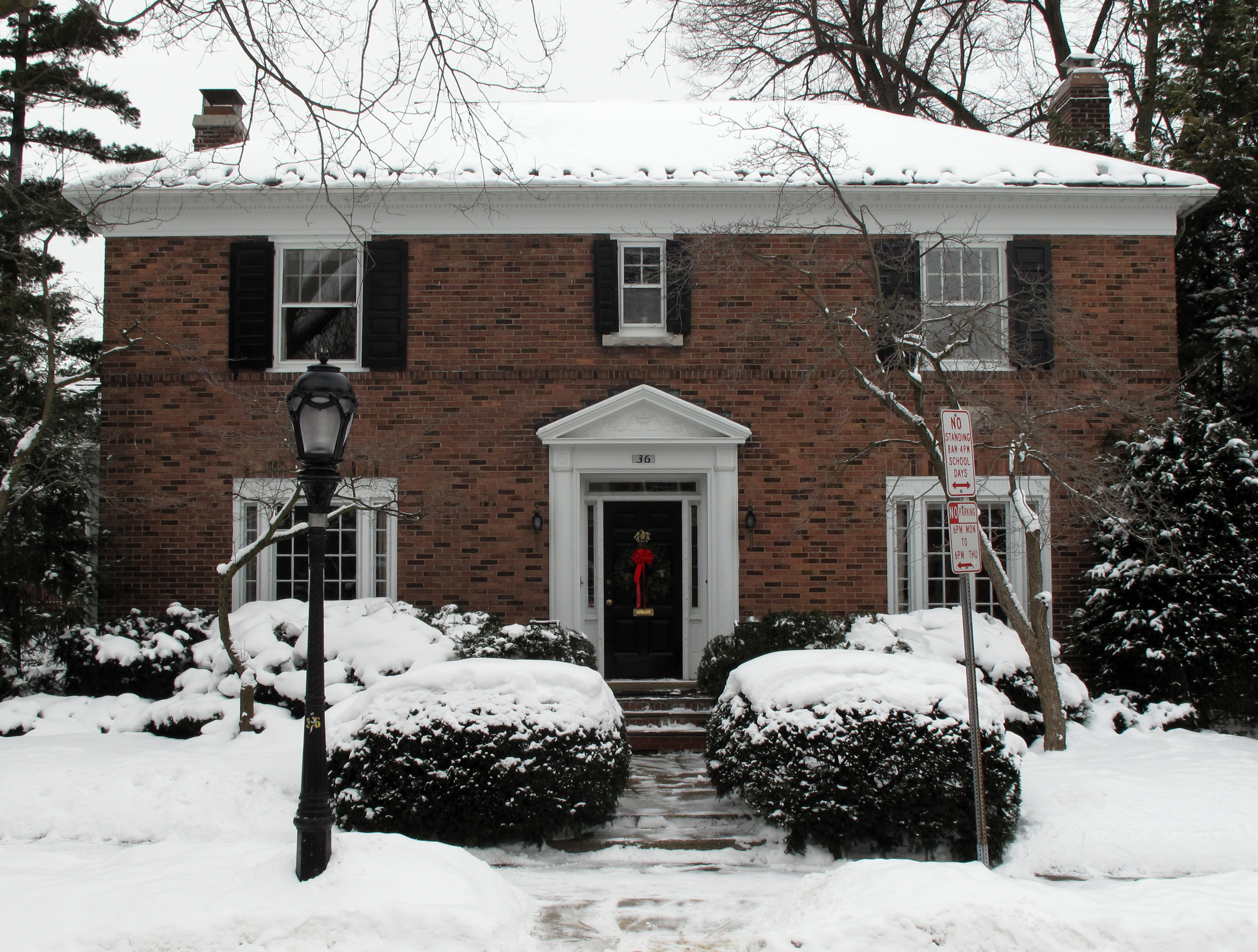
- Col. William Kelly House, January 2010

- Location within New York Location within the United States
- Location: 36 Tudor Place, Buffalo, New York
- Coordinates: 42°55′1″N 78°52′30″W
- Area: 0.2 acres (0.081 ha)
- Built: 1937
- Built by: Rixon Construction Co.
- Architects: Hopkins, Albert Hart
- Architectural style: Colonial Revival
- NRHP reference No.: 97000414
- NYSRHP No.: 02940.002756

Significant dates
- Added to NRHP: May 23, 1997
- Designated NYSRHP: April 3, 1997

The Col. William Kelly House is a historic house located at 36 Tudor Place in Buffalo, New York, United States.

== Description and history ==
It is a Colonial Revival style brick dwelling constructed in 1937. It has a modified square plan with a three bay front featuring a pedimented center entrance with a finely detailed Adamesque surround and engaged Doric order columns.

It was listed on the National Register of Historic Places on May 23, 1997. It is located in the Elmwood Historic District–East.
