= Redstone (Burlington, Vermont) =

- Redstone Historic District
- U.S. National Register of Historic Places
- U.S. Historic district
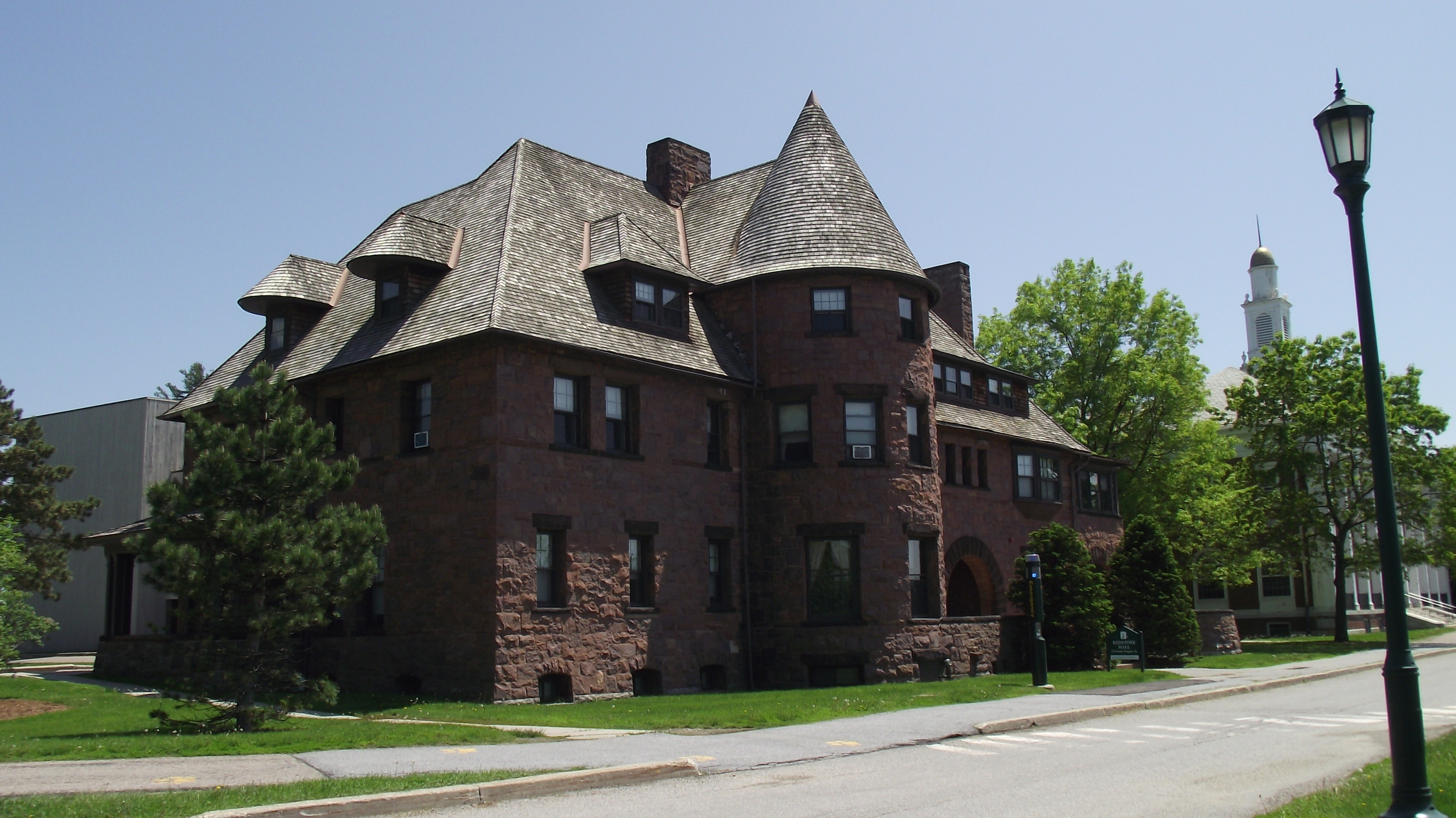
- Redstone Hall

- Location within Vermont Location within the United States
- Location: S. Prospect St., Burlington, Vermont
- Coordinates: 44°28′12″N 73°11′54″W
- Area: 17 acres (6.9 ha)
- Built: 1880
- Architect: McKim, Mead & White; Marling & Burdett
- Architectural style: Colonial Revival, Shingle Style, Romanesque
- NRHP reference No.: 91001614
- Added to NRHP: November 14, 1991

Redstone is a historic former estate on South Prospect Street in Burlington, Vermont. It was developed in 1889, and includes some of Burlington's finest examples of Richardsonian Romanesque, Shingle, and Colonial Revival architecture. Its surviving elements are Redstone Green and some of its surrounding buildings on the campus of the University of Vermont, which acquired the property in 1921, and are part of the university's Redstone Campus. It was listed on the National Register of Historic Places in 1991 as the Redstone Historic District.

== Description and history ==
The former Redstone estate is located at the far southwestern end of the University of Vermont campus, between South Prospect Street and its athletic facilities. Originally 66 acres (27 ha), the southern and eastern portions of the estate have been developed mainly for university housing. Adjacent to South Prospect Street is Redstone Green, a large open space that is defined by the estate's original main drive, which forms a rough square with South Prospect Street. At the east side of the green is a rise, on which stands Andrew Buell's 1889 Richardsonian Romanesque house, now known as Redstone Hall. At the northern end of the rise stand two water towers, iconic features of the university landscape; one is a 19th-century circular brick building, the other is a 20th-century steel frame structure. On the north side of the drive stands the original gatehouse for the estate, and the Blundell House, an International Style house built by the university in 1961. On the south side of the green stands Robinson Hall, which was built by the Buells as a carriage house. Between Robinson Hall and Redstone Hall stand Southwick Hall, a Colonial Revival structure built as a women's dormitory in the 1920s (to which a modern addition has been added to the east), and Coolidge Hall, a 1940s dormitory.

The land for the estate was developed in 1889 by Andrew Buell, a Burlington lumber magnate. Development of this area was made possible by construction of the brick water tower in 1880, and Buell developed the property as a country estate. It remained his family home until 1921, when it was purchased by the university. The university first used the space as a women's campus, and has since developed outer portions of the estate for housing and part of its athletic facilities. Buell's estate buildings were designed by Herbert C Burdett of Buffalo, New York, who had previously worked for both H.H. Richardson and the firm of Hartwell and Richardson. The early additions to the Redstone Campus made by the university were done in collaboration with McKim, Mead & White, and include Southwick Hall and Slade Hall.

== See also ==
- National Register of Historic Places listings in Chittenden County, Vermont
