= James and Fanny How House =

Historic house in New York, United States

- U.S. National Register of Historic Places
- U.S. Historic district – Contributing property
- New York State Register of Historic Places
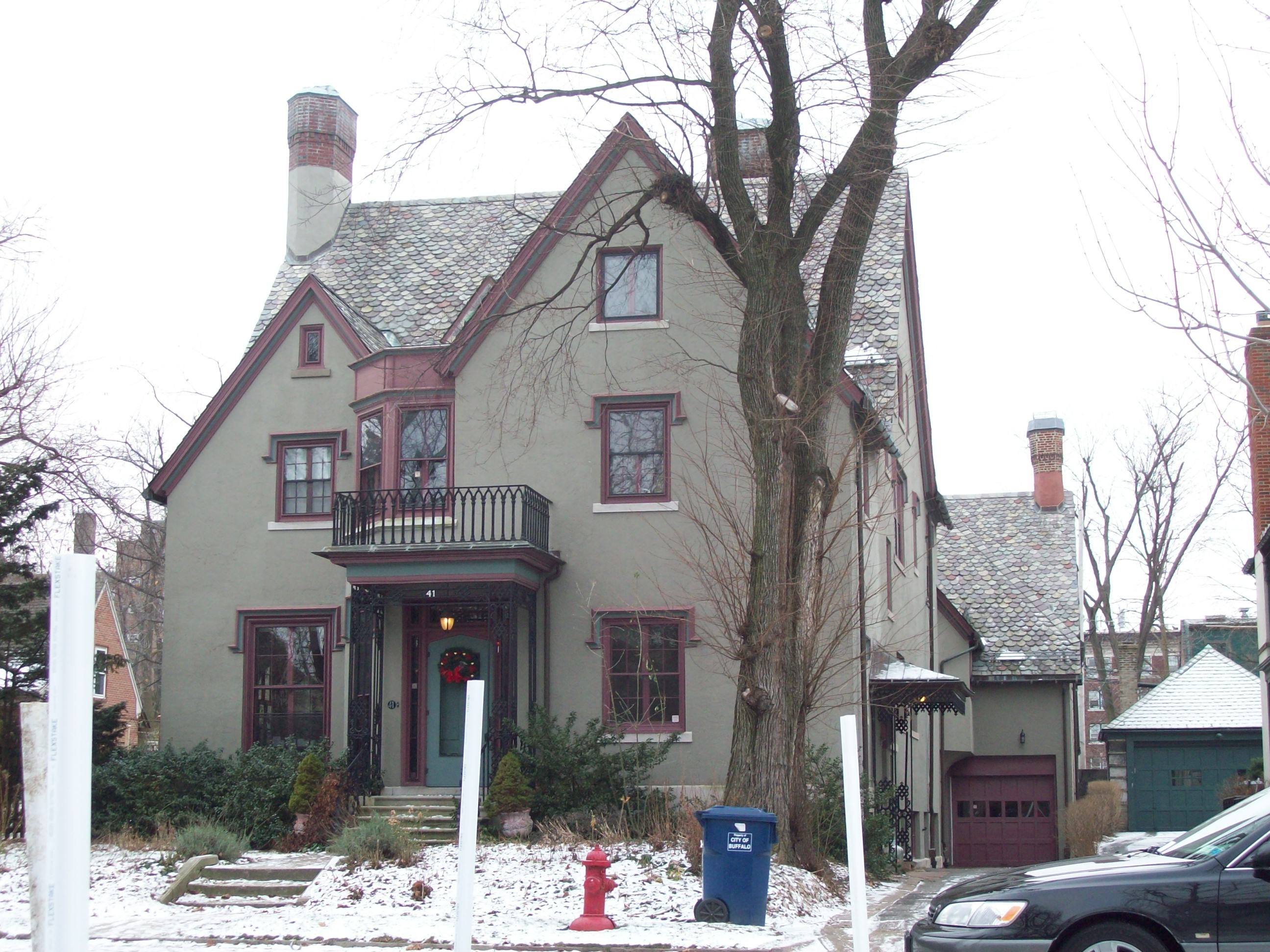
- James and Fanny How House, December 2009

- Location within New York Location within the United States
- Location: 41 St. Catherine's Crt., Buffalo, New York
- Coordinates: 42°54′59″N 78°52′28″W
- Area: 0.2 acres (0.081 ha)
- Built: 1924
- Architects: Olmsted, Harold L.
- Architectural style: Tudor Revival
- NRHP reference No.: 97000415
- NYSRHP No.: 02940.008963

Significant dates
- Added to NRHP: May 23, 1997
- Designated NYSRHP: April 2, 1997

James and Fanny How House is a historic home located at Buffalo in Erie County, New York. It is a noted example of a Tudor Revival–style dwelling designed by local architect Harold L. Olmsted in 1924. It is composed of three sections: a 2 1/2-story cross-gabled front block, a 1-story gabled connecting link, and a 2-story gabled rear block with a small 1-story wing. It has a limestone ashlar and concrete foundation and painted stucco-covered exterior walls of brick and tile.

It was listed on the National Register of Historic Places in 1997. It is located in the Elmwood Historic District–East.
