= Garret Club =

Historic women's clubhouse in Buffalo, New York

- U.S. National Register of Historic Places
- U.S. Historic district – Contributing property
- New York State Register of Historic Places
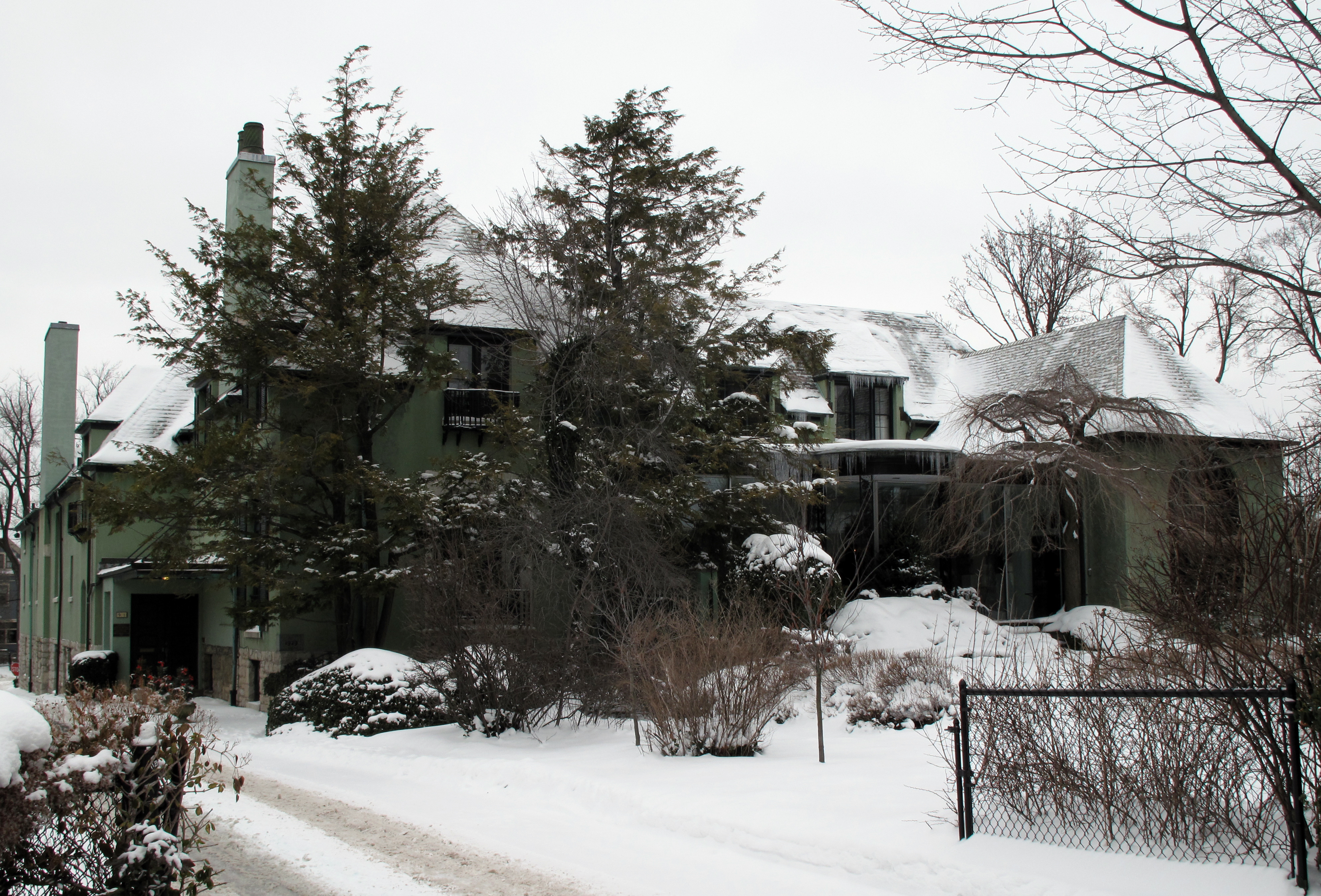
- Garret Club, January 2010

- Location within New York Location within the United States
- Location: 91 Cleveland Ave., Buffalo, New York
- Coordinates: 42°55′4″N 78°52′22″W
- Area: less than one acre
- Built: 1929
- Architects: Green, E.B. Jr.
- Architectural style: Late 19th And 20th Century Revivals, French vernacular
- NRHP reference No.: 06001212
- NYSRHP No.: 02940.002792

Significant dates
- Added to NRHP: January 4, 2007
- Designated NYSRHP: October 28, 2006

Garret Club is a historic woman's clubhouse located at Buffalo in Erie County, New York. It was designed by noted Buffalo architect Edward Brodhead Green and constructed in 1929. It is a two-story, L-shaped building constructed of hollow tile with a stucco finish. It has a slate tile roof and is reflective of French vernacular architecture.

It was listed on the National Register of Historic Places in 2007. It is located in the Elmwood Historic District–East.

The club was founded in March 1902. Katharine Cornell joined in 1913 and was an active member, participating in theatrical productions.
