= Elmwood Village, Buffalo =

Elmwood
- Neighborhood
- Elmwood Village
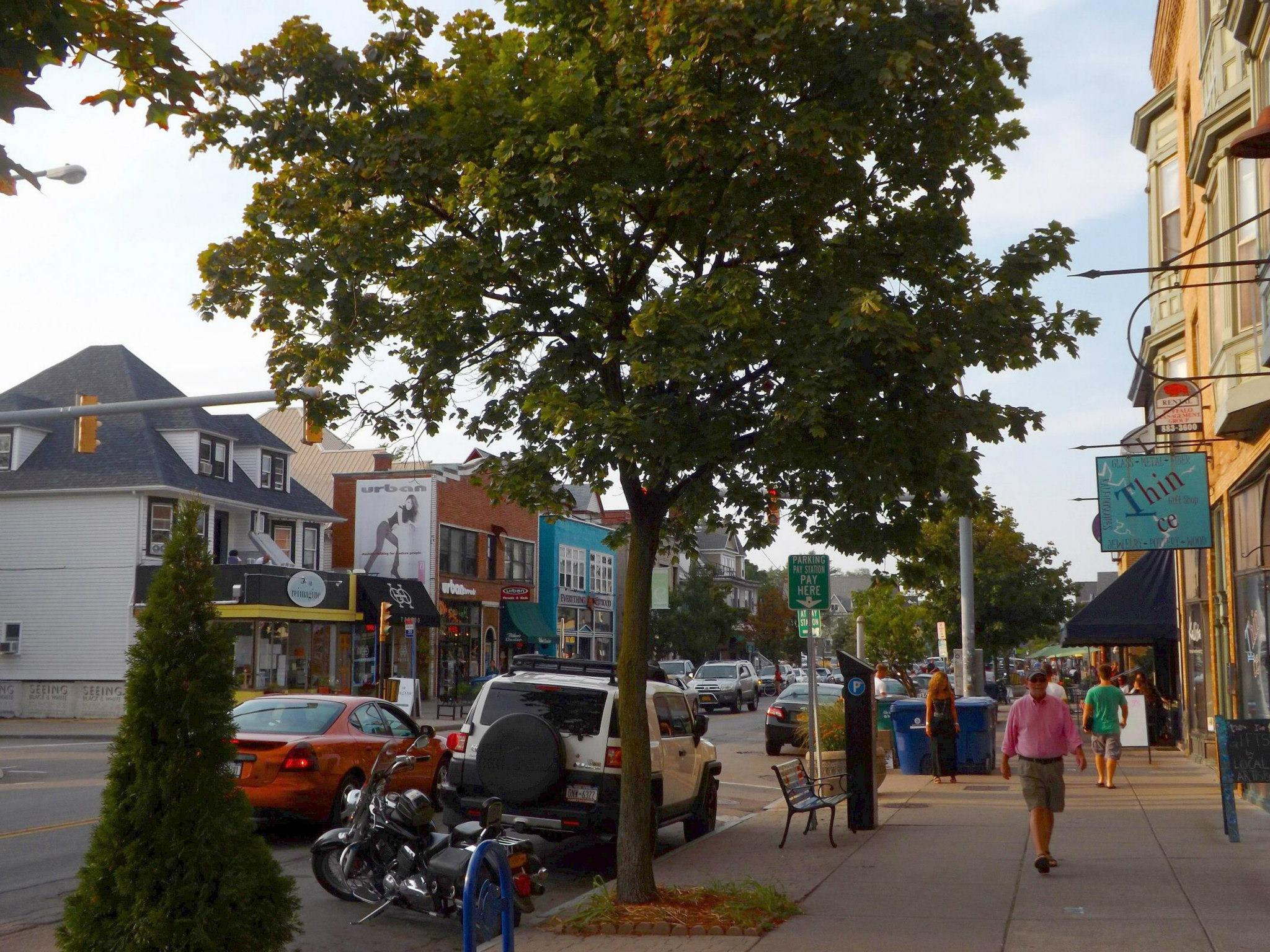
- Elmwood Avenue

- Location within New York
- Coordinates: 42.9003910°N 78.8774150°W
- Country: United States
- State: New York
- City: Buffalo, New York
- Elevation: 643 ft (196 m)

Population (2010)
  - Total: 30,774
- Time zone: Eastern (EST)
- ZIP Code: 14201, 14202, 14209, 14213, 14222
- Area code: 716
- Website: Official website

Elmwood Village is a neighborhood in Buffalo, New York.

== Geography ==
Elmwood Village is in the central part of Buffalo. The neighborhood is located along Elmwood Avenue. The neighborhood is bordered on the south by the Allentown neighborhood. The northern boundary of the neighborhood abuts Buffalo State College and Delaware Park just beyond the Burchfield Penney Art Center. Its eastern boundary is Delaware Avenue (NY 384). The western boundary is Richmond Avenue, to the west is the West Side neighborhood.

== Demographics ==
Historical population
Census	Pop.	Note	%±
2010	30,774		—

== Arts and culture ==
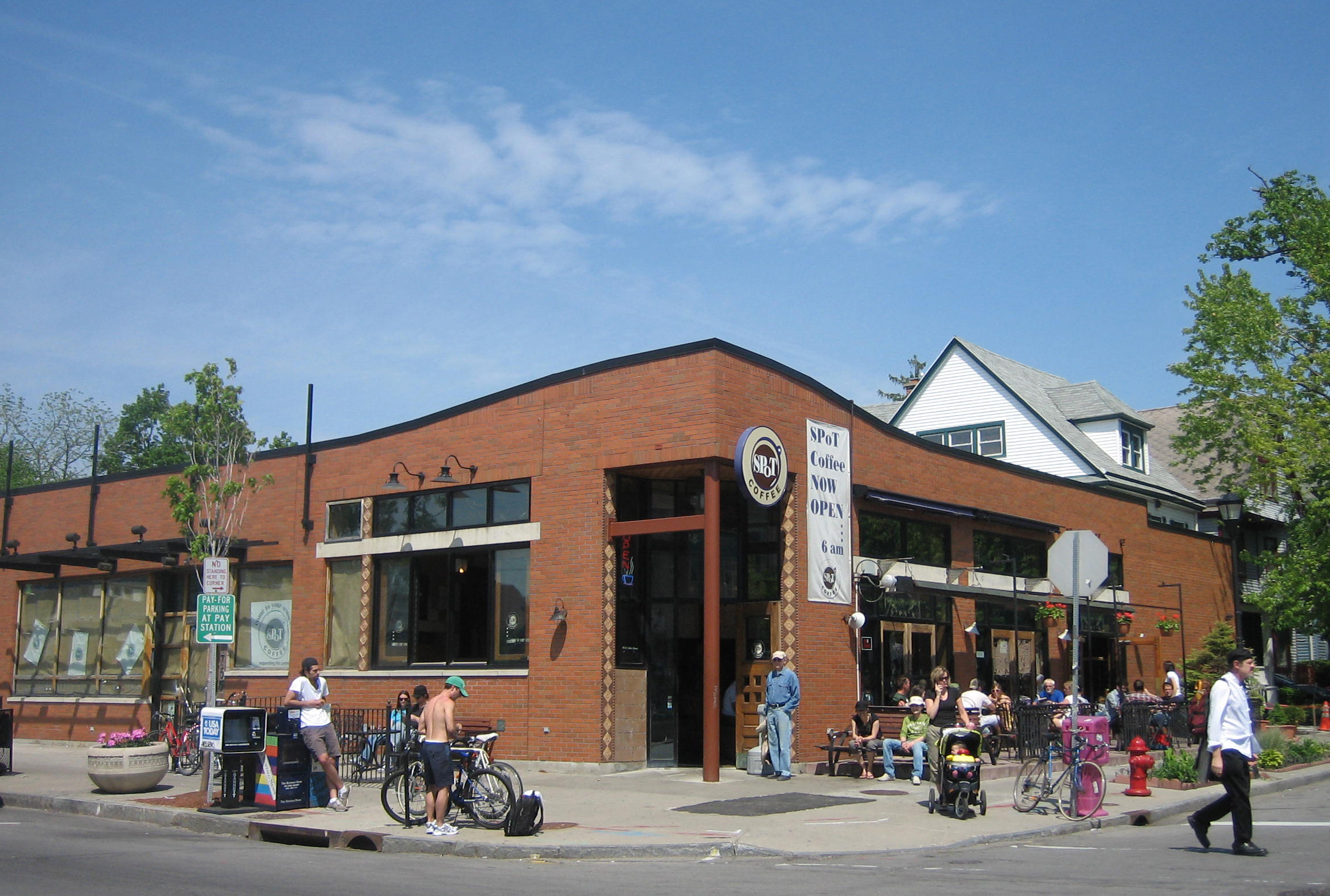
SPoT Coffee on Elmwood Avenue

=== Historic Sites ===
There are 11 sites in Elmwood Village listed on the National Register of Historic Places.

== Parks and recreation ==
Bidwell Parkway, a component of Frederick Law Olmsted (1822-1903) and Calvert Vaux's original parkway system, was once one of Buffalo's most prestigious addresses. It is a residential boulevard 200 feet wide, running northeast diagonally between Colonial Circle and Soldiers Circle. It is named for Daniel Davidson Bidwell, heir to Buffalo Banta and Bidwell Shipbuilding Co, who was also active in Buffalo's pre-civil-war militia and instrumental in organizing the city's first Police force. Bidwell Parkway is the location of the Elmwood/Bidwell Farmers Market, a producers-only market that runs every Saturday from mid-May to the end of November from 8 am to 1 pm. The Bidwell Parkway is also the location of the Annual Elmwood/Bidwell Free Summer Concert Series.

St. Catherine's Court (1922), off of Cleveland Avenue, has been identified as one of the first modern culs-de-sac in America.
