= Ferry Street Bridge =

Ferry Street Bridge may refer to:

- Ferry Street-Thorofare Canal Bridge, Grosse Ile, Michigan, listed on the National Register of Historic Places (NRHP)
- Anoka–Champlin Mississippi River Bridge, Champlin and Anoka, Minnesota, also known as Ferry Street Bridge, NRHP-listed
- Ferry Street Bridge (Eugene, Oregon), NRHP-listed
- Ferry Street Bridge (Connecticut), see List_of_movable_bridges_in_Connecticut
- Ferry Street Bridge (Buffalo), see Black Rock Canal
