= Black Rock, Buffalo =

Coordinates: 42.935°N 78.900°W

Black Rock
- Neighborhood
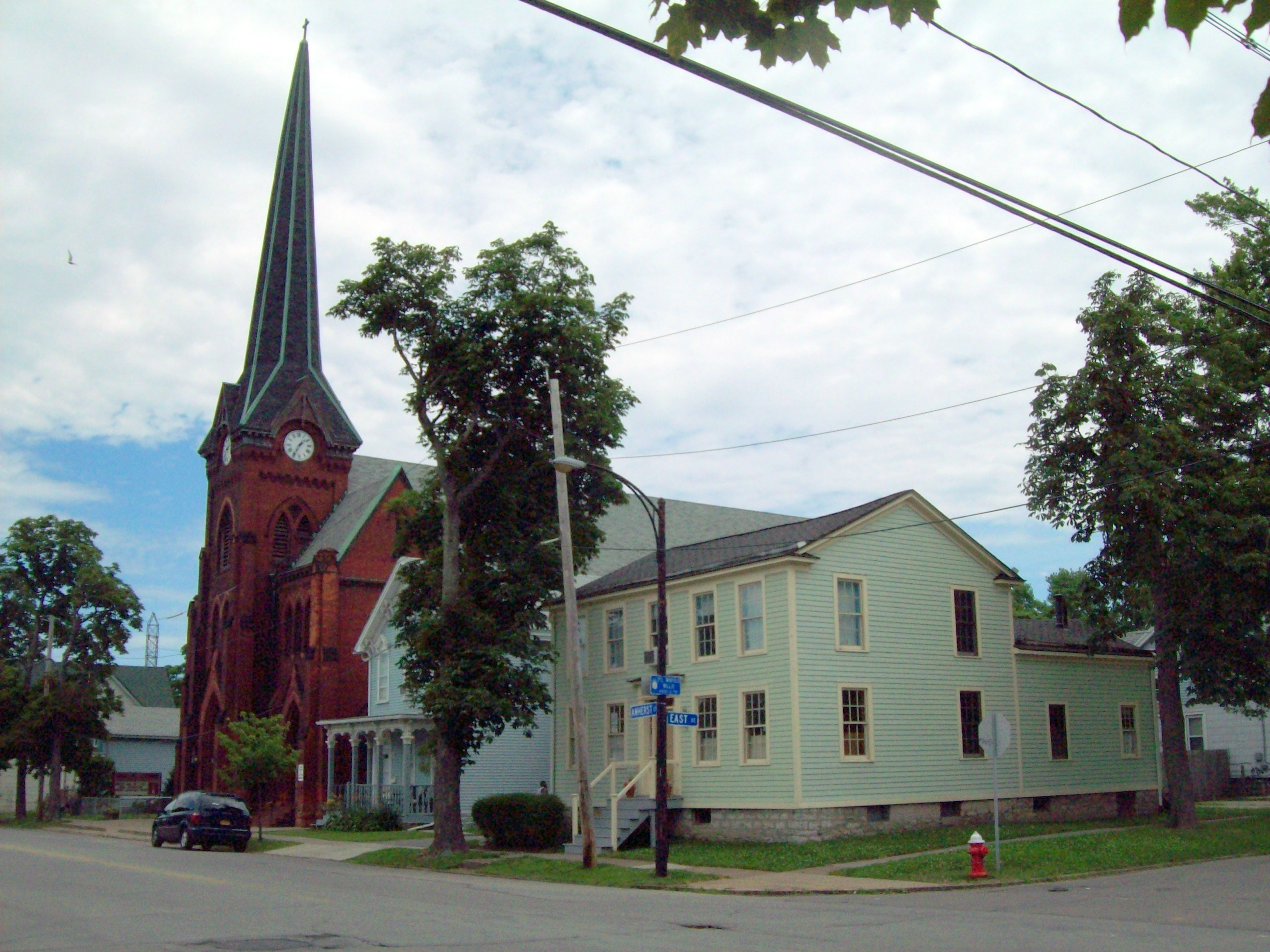
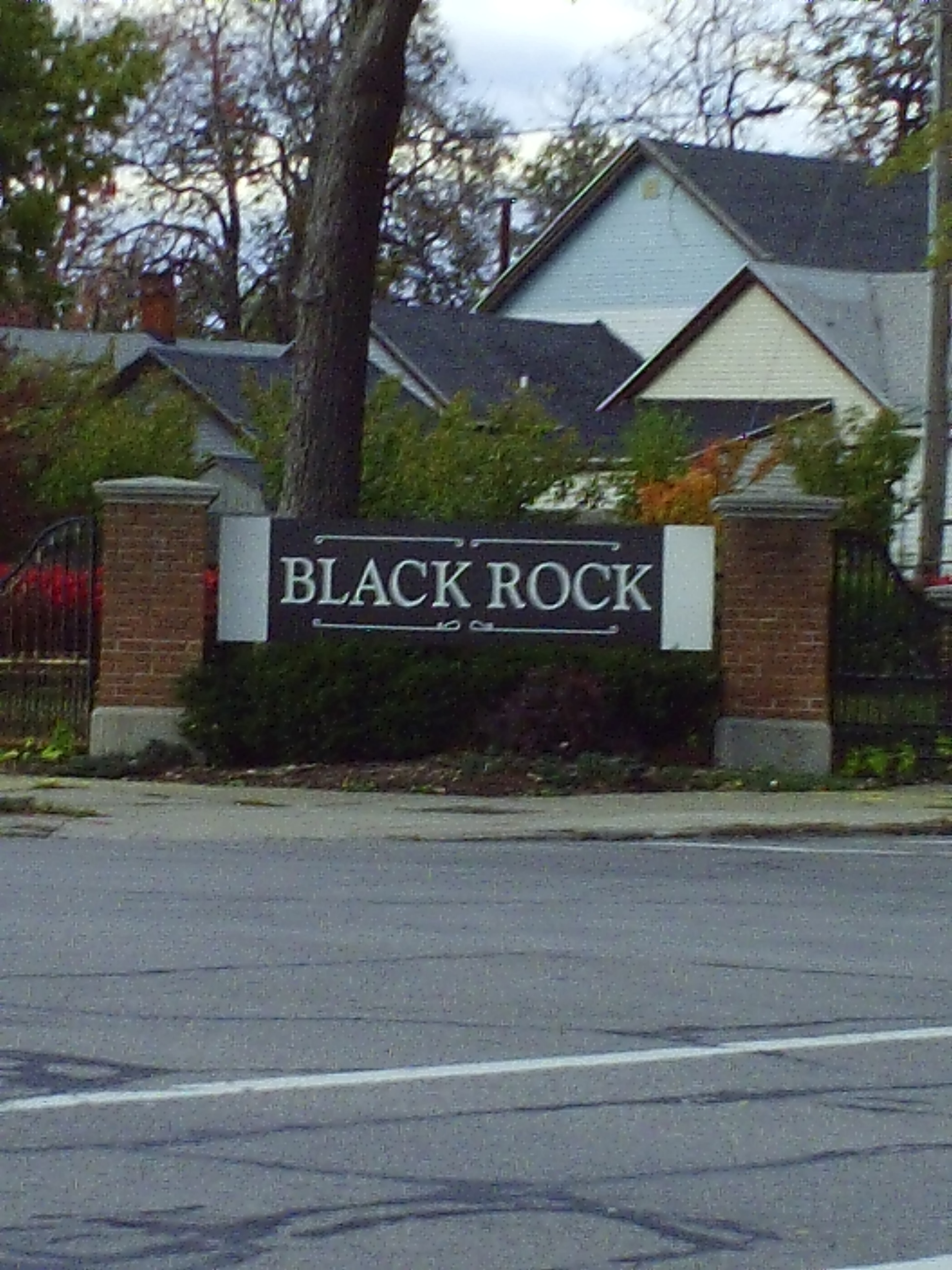
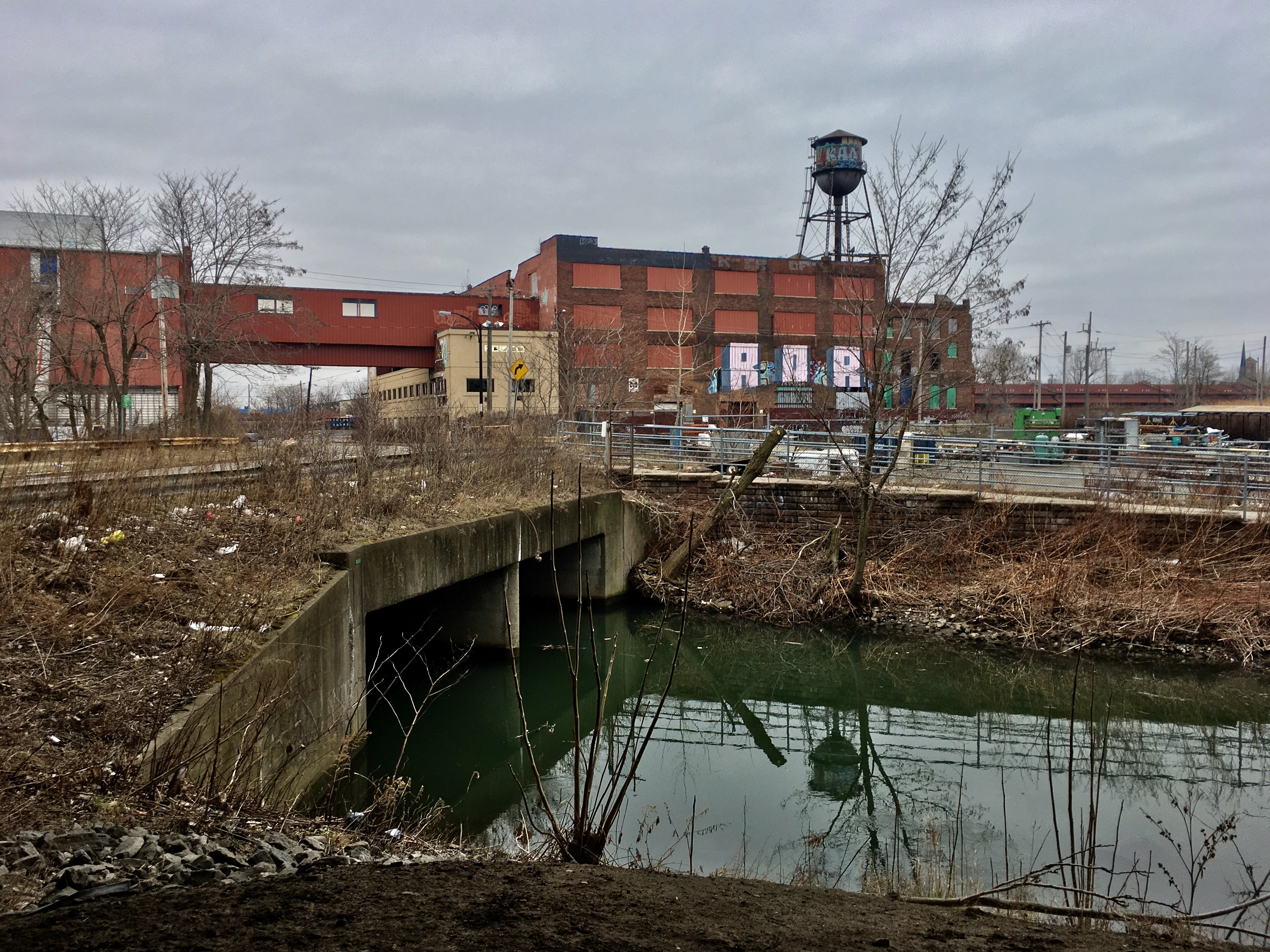
- Left to right from top: Market Square Historic District, neighborhood sign, 31 Tonawanda Street
- Interactive map of Black Rock
- Country: United States
- State: New York
- City: Buffalo
- Incorporated (Town): 1839
- Annexed (Buffalo): 1853

Government
  - Council Member: Joseph Golombek (D)

Black Rock, once an independent municipality, is now a neighborhood of the northwest section of the city of Buffalo, New York. In the 1820s, Black Rock was the rival of Buffalo for the terminus of the Erie Canal, but Buffalo, with its larger harbor capacity and greater distance from the shores of Canada, a recent antagonist during the War of 1812, won the competition. Black Rock took its name from a large outcropping of black limestone along the Niagara River, which was blasted away in the early 1820s to make way for the canal.

== History ==
The earliest known European settlement in Black Rock dates back to around 1795, when the Black Rock Ferry, which crossed the treacherous Niagara River to Fort Erie, Ontario, Canada, began operation. Ferry service from Black Rock to Fort Erie continued under various proprietors until May 1951.

In spite of losing the Erie Canal terminus to Buffalo and twice being burned to the ground by the British during the War of 1812, Black Rock continued to prosper. In 1814, a small group of American riflemen defended Black Rock and neighboring Buffalo from a British assault and, in 1839, it was incorporated as a town. In 1853, the City of Buffalo annexed the town of Black Rock.

Because of its ferry and strategic position across the Niagara River from Canada, Black Rock was an important crossing place for African-Americans escaping slavery via the Underground Railroad. This heritage was celebrated for about ten years with an annual Underground Railroad Re-Enactment at Freedom Park (Buffalo, New York) on Unity Island at Niagara and West Ferry Streets, the site of the former ferry dock.

The area's first industry was shipbuilding, later supplanted by foundries, manufacturing, and canal commerce. Today Black Rock boasts some pre-annexation houses and many excellent, sometimes vacant examples of early 20th century brick and masonry industrial architecture.

Black Rock's history is amply documented in the library collections of the Buffalo History Museum.

The Market Square Historic District was listed on the National Register of Historic Places in 2011.

=== Railroad link ===
In the 1870s, the International Railway Bridge connected the two nations at Black Rock, an engineering marvel at the time. The Black Rock Rail Yard handled both passenger service and commercial transport of goods into and out of Canada. Following the completion of the St. Lawrence Seaway, the construction of the United States's Interstate Highway system, Canada's Queen Elizabeth Highway, and the increase of commercial air travel, the Black Rock Rail Yard lost its passenger service and later most of its commercial freight service. The railroad bridge, however, remains in heavy usage and is one of the most important rail crossings between the United States and Canada.

=== Prominent residents ===
Black Rock's best-known resident was American poet Robert Creeley, who lived with his family in a converted firehouse at the corner of Amherst and East Streets from 1990 to 2003. Another prominent resident was US Secretary of War Peter Buell Porter. Former US Congressman John M. Holley lived in Black Rock. Amanda Jones lived in Black Rock.

== See also ==
- Neighborhoods of Buffalo, New York
- Walk-in-the-water (steamboat)—Built in Black Rock
- Black Rock Lock
