= Market Square Historic District (Buffalo, New York) =

Historic district in New York, United States

- U.S. National Register of Historic Places
- U.S. Historic district
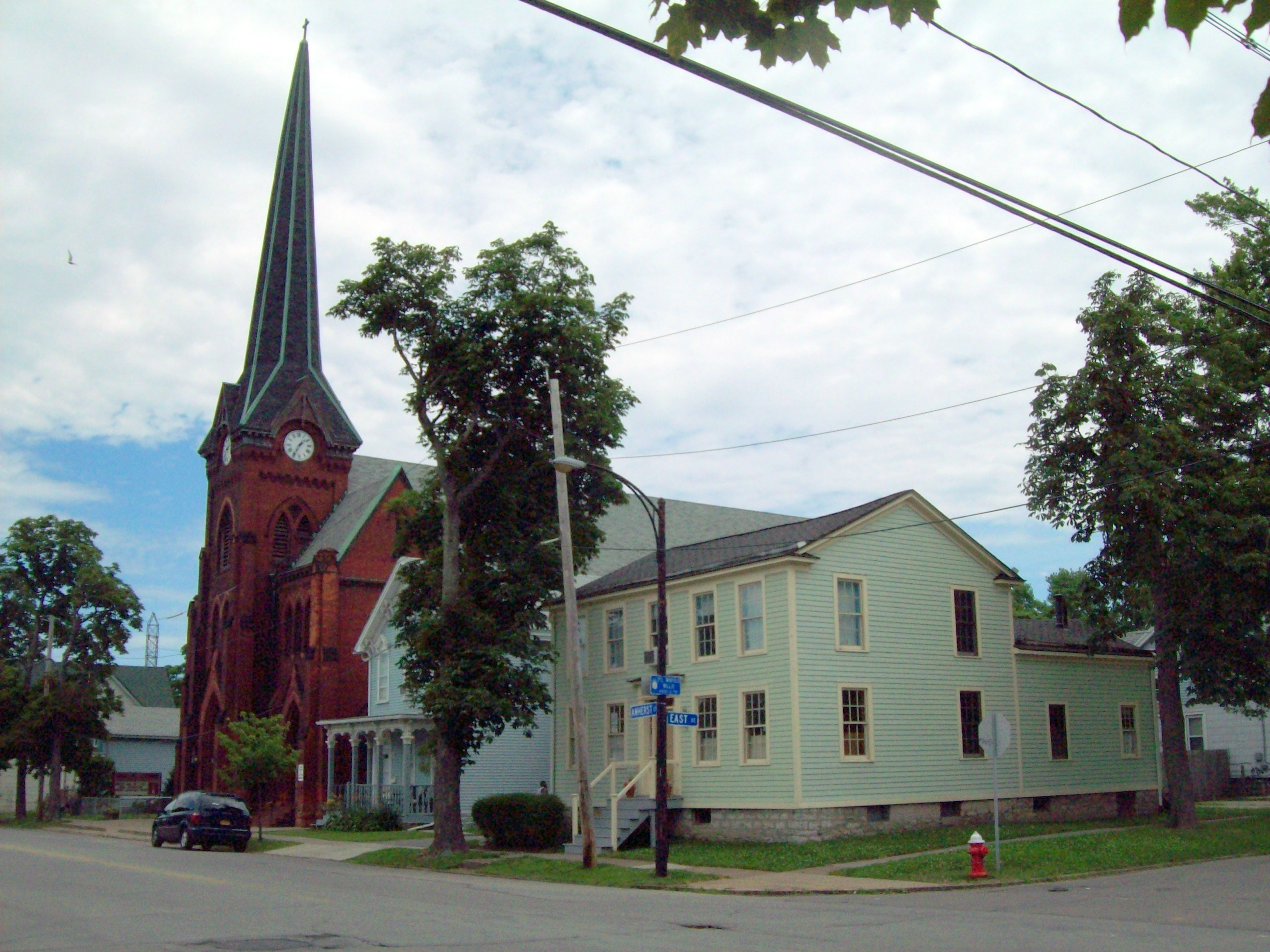
- Market Square Historic District, July 2011

- Location within New York Location within the United States
- Location: Niagara, East and Dearborn Sts. Buffalo, New York
- Coordinates: 42°56′6″N 78°54′2″W
- Area: 1.18 acres (0.48 ha)
- Built: c. 1830-1912
- Architectural style: Federal, Gothic Revival, Italianate, Queen Anne, Romanesque Revival, Bungalow/craftsman
- NRHP reference No.: 11000743
- Added to NRHP: October 18, 2011

Market Square Historic District is a national historic district located in the Black Rock neighborhood of Buffalo in Erie County, New York. The district encompasses 15 contributing buildings and 1 contributing site in a mixed residential and commercial section of Buffalo. The district developed between about 1830 and 1912, and includes a buildings in a variety of architectural styles including Federal, Gothic Revival, Italianate, Queen Anne, Romanesque Revival, and Bungalow / American Craftsman. Located in the district is the separately listed St. Francis Xavier Roman Catholic Parish Complex. Other notable contributing resources include the Market Square (1830), Black Rock Savings and Loan (1870-1910), Firehouse Engine #15 (1912), Smith House and Tavern (c. 1830-1835), St. John's Church (1894), and Howell House and Store (c. 1830, c. 1910).

It was listed on the National Register of Historic Places in 2011.
