= Buffalo Harbor North and South Entrance Lights =

Coordinates: 42°50′0″N 78°52′3″W

Buffalo Harbor North and South entrance Lights are lighthouses located at the entrance to Buffalo harbor in New York. The south light is at Stony Point breakwater (known also as the Buffalo Harbor South Entrance Light), and the North light was relocated.

The lighthouses were established and lit in 1903, automated in 1935; the North light was deactivated in the 1980s. The South light is still operational. The foundation materials are dressed stone and timber for the south light and concrete pier on crib for the North light. The lighthouses were constructed out of cast iron boiler plate. The tower has a conical bottle shape. It is white, with a black lantern. The original lenses installed in 1903 were fourth (south) and sixth order (North) Fresnel lenses.
