= Freedom Park (Buffalo, New York) =

Public park on Unity Island in the Niagara River in Buffalo, New York

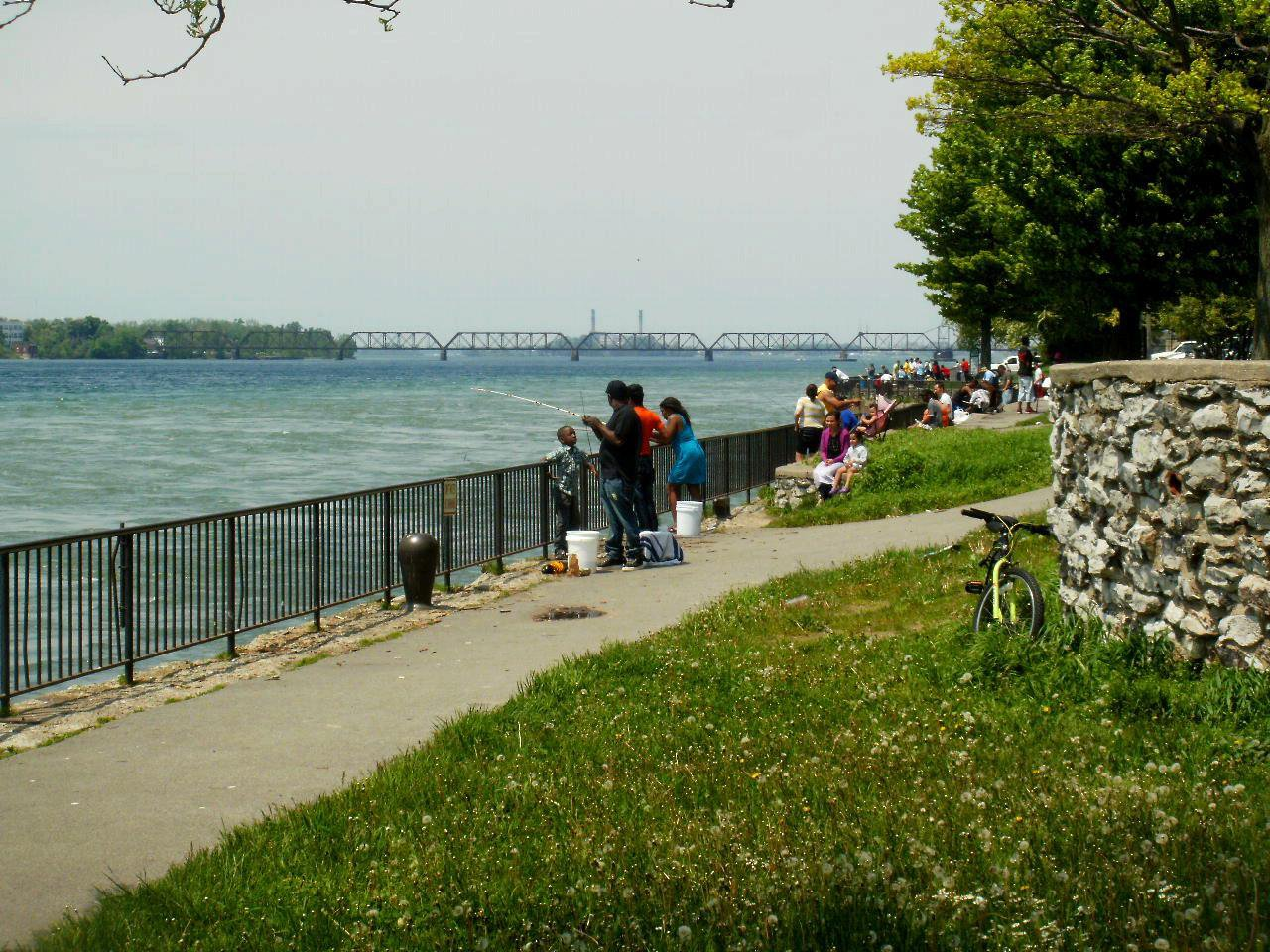
- Fishing is a popular activity at Freedom Park, a small riverfront park on Buffalo's West Side.

- Location within New York
- Type: Regional park
- Location: 1170 Niagara Street; Buffalo, New York 14213
- Nearest city: Buffalo, New York
- Coordinates: 42°54′54″N 78°54′11″W
- Operator: City of Buffalo
- Open: All year

Freedom Park, formerly known as Broderick Park, is a public park situated on Unity Island in the Niagara River in Buffalo, New York, United States. It was originally named for Michael Broderick (died 1951), one of the founders of the West Side Rowing Club, which had a clubhouse on the southern point of Unity Island until 1975, when it was destroyed by fire. In 2023, it was renamed Freedom Park in honor of African-American freedom seekers who caught the Black Rock Ferry there to escape from slavery in the United States and land in safety in Canada.

== Location and recreational opportunities ==
Freedom Park, following an elongated shape, is located on the southern tip of Unity Island between the Niagara River and the Black Rock Canal. The park overlooks the Canada–US border and is within view of the Peace Bridge, which links the State of New York with the Canadian Province of Ontario at Fort Erie.

Freedom Park offers recreational facilities for local residents and visitors. Under the Buffalo Micro Parks system within the City of Buffalo, contribution is made toward the maintenance and improvement of amenities.

== Historical significance to Underground Railroad ==
Given the park's proximity to Canada, it served as a transit area for African-Americans heading for the border on the opposite side of the Niagara River from the park. The park once housed docks for the Black Rock Ferry, which is known to have transported fugitive slaves to Canada as part of the Underground Railroad.

These activities were particularly precipitated by the passage of the Fugitive Slave Law of 1850, which to some measure brought about the nationalizing of some of the consequences of the slavery practiced in the Southern states, and hence the increased flow of African-Americans travelers seeking liberty in Canada. Ironically it was Buffalo's own Millard Fillmore who, as president of the United States, signed this measure into law. (See also: Presidency of Millard Fillmore#Fugitive Slave Act.)

After the American Civil War period and the Emancipation Proclamation, the park ceased to have the same clandestine focus for African-Americans fleeing from slavery.

=== Reenactments and commemorations ===
In the 1990s, reenactments and commemorations of Underground Railroad events were regularly held at Freedom Park under the sponsorship of Buffalo Quarters Historical Society. In 2010, Freedom Park was recognized by the U.S. National Park Service as a National Underground Railroad Network to Freedom site.

== Recent developments ==
Freedom Park — visibly close to the Peace Bridge — has sometimes been used as a backdrop to public meetings on subjects of law and administrative reform as they relate to cross-border issues.

In 2008, funding shortfalls led to an unsuccessful proposal calling for Freedom Park to be transferred from the City of Buffalo to the State of New York, to become part of a future state park.

In 2012, plans were announced for a 1.5 million dollar revitalization of the park, with plans for a new amphitheater, improved facilities, and a new memorial celebrating the park's involvement in the Underground Railroad. The project commenced in 2013.

== See also ==
- Canada–United States border
- Underground Railroad
- Fugitive Slave Law - Effects
- Black Rock - History
- Fort Erie - Underground Railroad
- List of crossings of the Niagara River
- Niagara River - Islands
