= Black Rock Rail Yard =

Railyard in Buffalo, New York

Coordinates: 42°57.4′N 78°53.43′W

The Black Rock Rail Yard is on the west side of Buffalo, New York, a half mile inland from the Niagara River, in the Black Rock neighborhood. The rail yard receives Canadian National Railway freight trains arriving from Canada by way of the International Railway Bridge.

The yard is surrounded by old residential neighborhoods and some abandoned industrial facilities. To the north of the yard, beneath the tracks, runs Hertel Avenue. An abandoned portion of the north yard is now an automobile junk yard; Austin Street runs under the center of the yard. Most of the trackbed in the yard has been ripped up.

To the south of the yard is the Niagara Thruway (I-190) and Scajaquada Creek which empties into the Black Rock Canal, formerly a channel of the Erie Canal. Trains depart the yard to the south by either the International Railway Bridge to Canada or the old New York Central Railroad line towards downtown Buffalo. Beneath the southern end of the yard crosses Amherst Street.

== History ==
Started in 1834 on state-owned land next to the Erie Canal, the yard began its existence as the northern terminus of the Buffalo and Black Rock Railroad, a horse-powered line from downtown Buffalo. The yard expanded significantly when the International Railway Bridge opened in 1874.
