= International Railway Bridge =

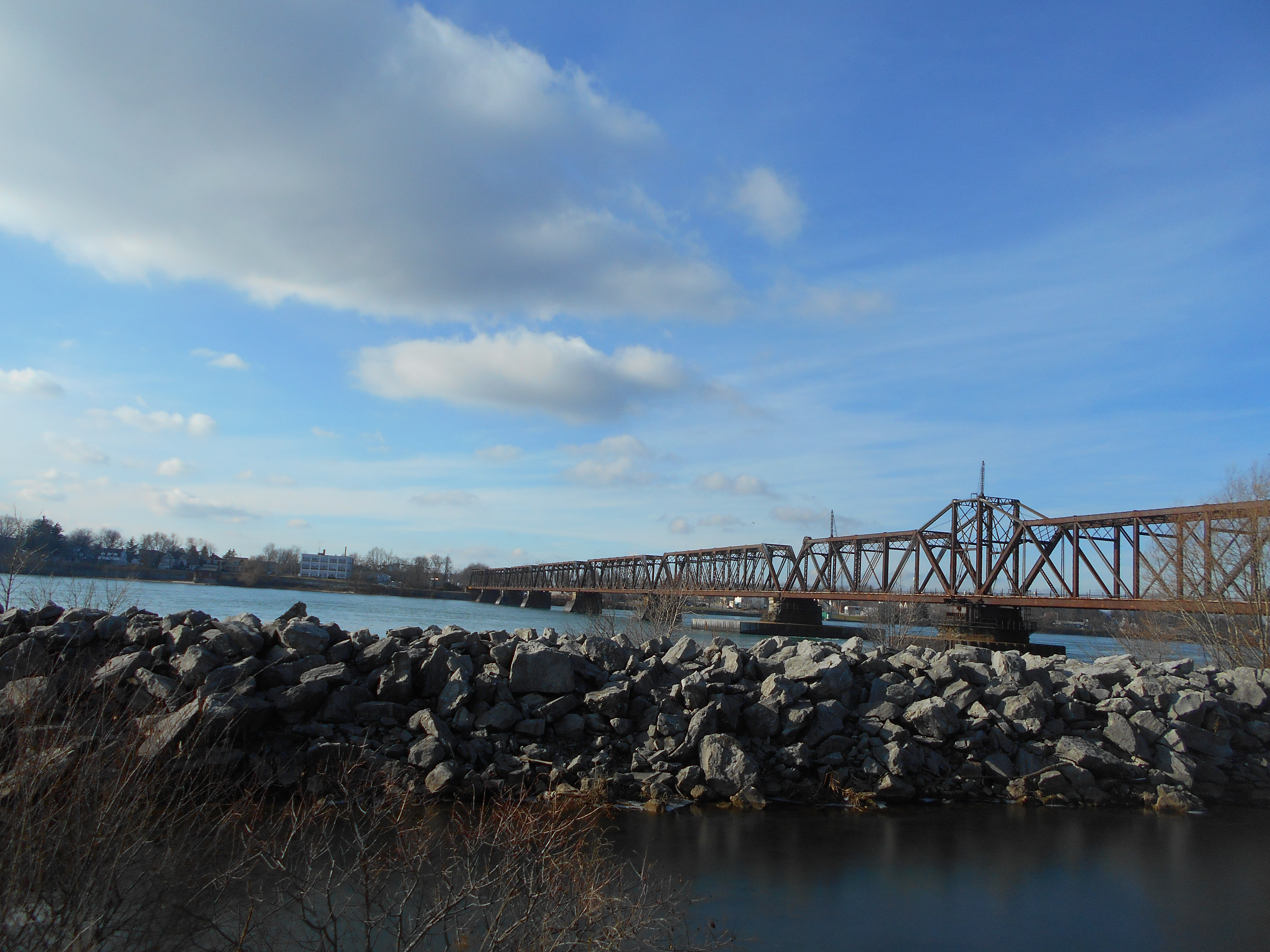
- The International Railway Bridge in December 2014 from the south, approaching Ferry Street.
- Coordinates: 42°55′44″N 78°54′36″W
- Carries: Canadian National Railway
- Crosses: Niagara River
- Locale: Fort Erie, Ontario and Buffalo, New York

Characteristics
- Total length: Main Channel 1,890 feet (576 m) - Black Rock Channel 440 feet (134 m)
- Clearance above: 22 feet (7 m)

History
- Opened: November 3, 1873; 152 years ago

Location
- Interactive map of International Railway Bridge

The International Railway Bridge is a two-span swing bridge carrying the Stamford Subdivision of the Canadian National Railway across the Niagara River between Fort Erie, Ontario, Canada, and Buffalo, New York, United States. It was originally built in 1873 for the International Bridge Company by Casimir Stanislaus Gzowski and D.L. MacPherson.

The bridge consists of two sections, the first extending from the Canadian shore to Unity Island (formerly known as Squaw Island), and the second extending from Unity Island to the American mainland shore. The portion between these was originally built on a trestle, and was filled to form an embankment soon after the bridge opened. Once on the American mainland, rail traffic is received by the Black Rock Rail Yard. The former CN Rail Fort Erie Yard for interchange was closed with only the Fidel shop remaining as the Niagara Railway Museum. The yard's trackage is mostly removed and used by Attar Metals and most of the roundhouse was demolished.

== The need for a bridge ==
Before bridges crossed the Upper Niagara River, it was crossed by several ferries running between Fort Erie and Buffalo. As well as being a serious bottleneck to both freight and passenger traffic, this crossing was often dangerous as the current in this area is swift, and ice is a problem several months of the year.

Proposals for a bridge surface by 1856, raising concerns about the effect to navigation rights on the river. By 1857, the Grand Trunk Railway had also proposed the crossing. The Dominion of Canada and the New York State Legislature drafted an agreement for construction of the bridge. Engineering surveys and fundraising took place over the next several years.

Construction of the bridge was recognized as a major technological challenge. The Niagara River in this area is up to 45 feet (14 m) deep and flows at up to 12 mph (19 km/h). It is also located at the east end of Lake Erie, and during the spring, large blocks of ice often flow down the river, threatening to destroy any bridge placed in its path. There are also major financial challenges in a project such as this. Some years were required to overcome these obstacles. In the 1860s, the American Civil War, and rebuilding afterwards, consumed much of the resources of the United States and further delayed construction. A meeting of the Commissioners of the company took place on April 5, 1864, as planning did not stop altogether, even during the war.

On May 18, 1870, The American and Dominion International Bridge Companies met to merge into one corporation for the purpose of building this bridge. A contract for the construction of the bridge was concluded with C. S. Gzowski & Co. It was stated that the bridge should be completed by the end of 1871.

== Construction ==
Prior to the construction of the eight stone piers, it was necessary to remove up to ten feet (three meters) of gravel from the bottom of the river. The piers were constructed from stone quarried at various locations on the Canadian side. Each pier was both pointed and sloped on the upstream side to most effectively break up ice flows. The iron for the bridge was manufactured at Phoenixville, Pennsylvania. Each of the 12 Pratt Truss spans was constructed on floating pontoons between the piers. Upon completion, the pontoons were filled with water to lower the bridge span precisely into place on the piers.

The bridge was constructed with two swing spans. One was located on the American side of the main channel of the river and provided a navigable opening of 160 feet (49 m) width. The second was located over the Black Rock Harbor and provided a navigable opening of 90 feet (27 m) width. Both were operated by steam and could open or close in approximately fifty seconds. The portion of the bridge from Unity Island to the US Mainland was constructed for two tracks. The longer portion from Unity Island to Canada was built as only a single track. Both sections had a common sidewalk on one side.

The bridge was opened November 3, 1873, almost two years after the date originally envisioned. Construction cost $1.5 million. It was constructed without the loss of any lives, which was uncommon for a major construction project in that era.

== Bridge operations and changes ==
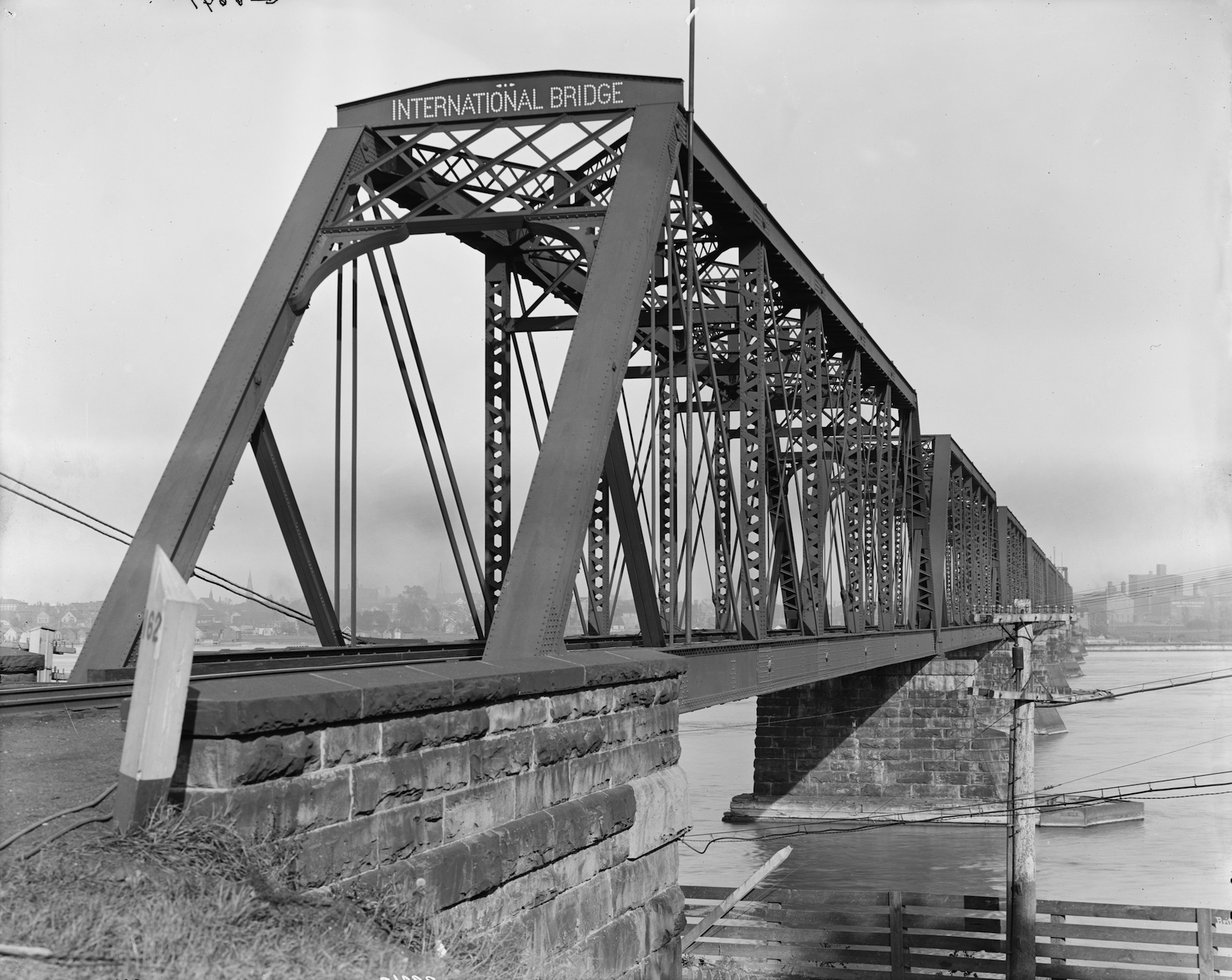
Photo from ca. 1900–1915, from Canadian side looking towards Buffalo

Before the opening day of the bridge, many railroads had already constructed tracks to its location. The Grand Trunk, Great Western, Canada Southern Railway, Erie, New York Central and New York, West Shore and Chicago were all prepared to begin using the bridge soon after opening day. There were conflicts between the various companies using the bridge, including one where the Canada Southern Railway filed suit over the excessive rate of $1 charged for each rail car it carried over the bridge. Such conflicts are not unexpected when several competing railway companies use a single track.

The bridge was modified in 1900, during which time the pedestrian walkway was removed from the main span. In 1903 baseball superstar and future Hall of Famer "Big" Ed Delahanty, age 35, died in an attempted crossing after being removed from a passenger train for being too drunk and abusive to passengers, threatening some with a razor after "5 whiskies". The bridge's busiest day ever was July 10, 1916, when 264 trains crossed.

The swing bridge in the main channel, which does not cross the international border, ceased to open at some time between 1941 and 1944 (it appears on the US War Department chart 312 in February 1941, but not on the same chart in March 1944, or any time thereafter). The swing span between Unity Island and the American mainland continues to swing today. This portion of the bridge was built for two tracks, and carries only one. It also carries a road on one side, and a bicycle lane on the other side. This span also crosses over Interstate 190, the Niagara Section of the New York State Thruway.

Operations on the bridge were suddenly suspended in February 1993 due to problems with some of the stone piers. Canadian National spent $2 million to refurbish these and get the bridge back into operation.

== The bridge today ==
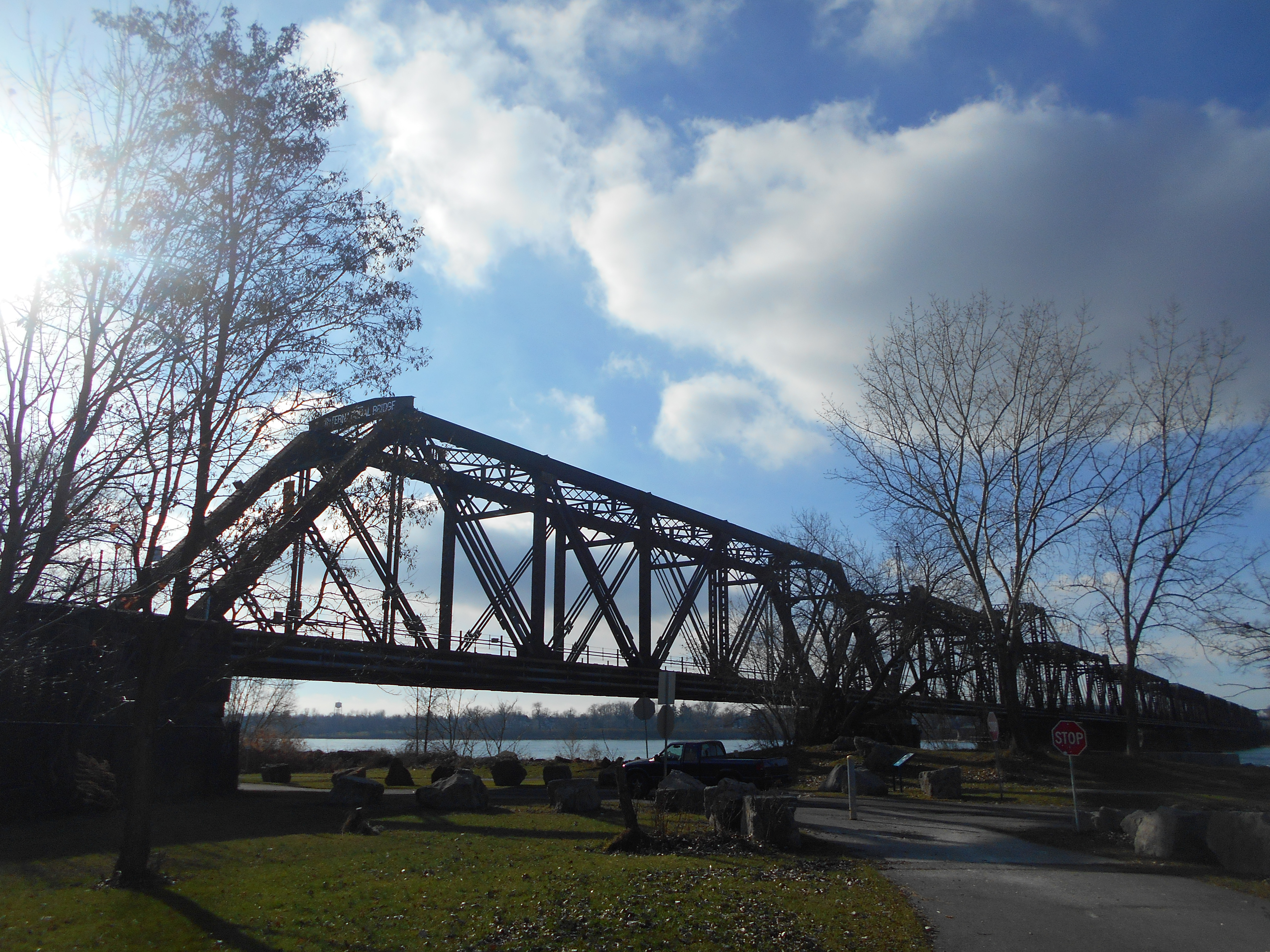
From the United States side (2014)

The bridge is now part of the Canadian National Railway Stamford Subdivision. It is also used by the Canadian Pacific Railway. The bridge has seen an increase in traffic since the Canadian Pacific abandoned its route via Niagara Falls, Ontario and re-routed across this bridge in late 2001. Fifteen trains per day is now typical and trains are often seen at or near a stop on the bridge undergoing various security checks to cross the international border. The bridge no longer carries passenger trains.

== See also ==
- List of bridges documented by the Historic American Engineering Record in New York
- List of international bridges in North America
