= Ferry Street–Thorofare Canal Bridge =

- Ferry Street Bridge
- U.S. National Register of Historic Places
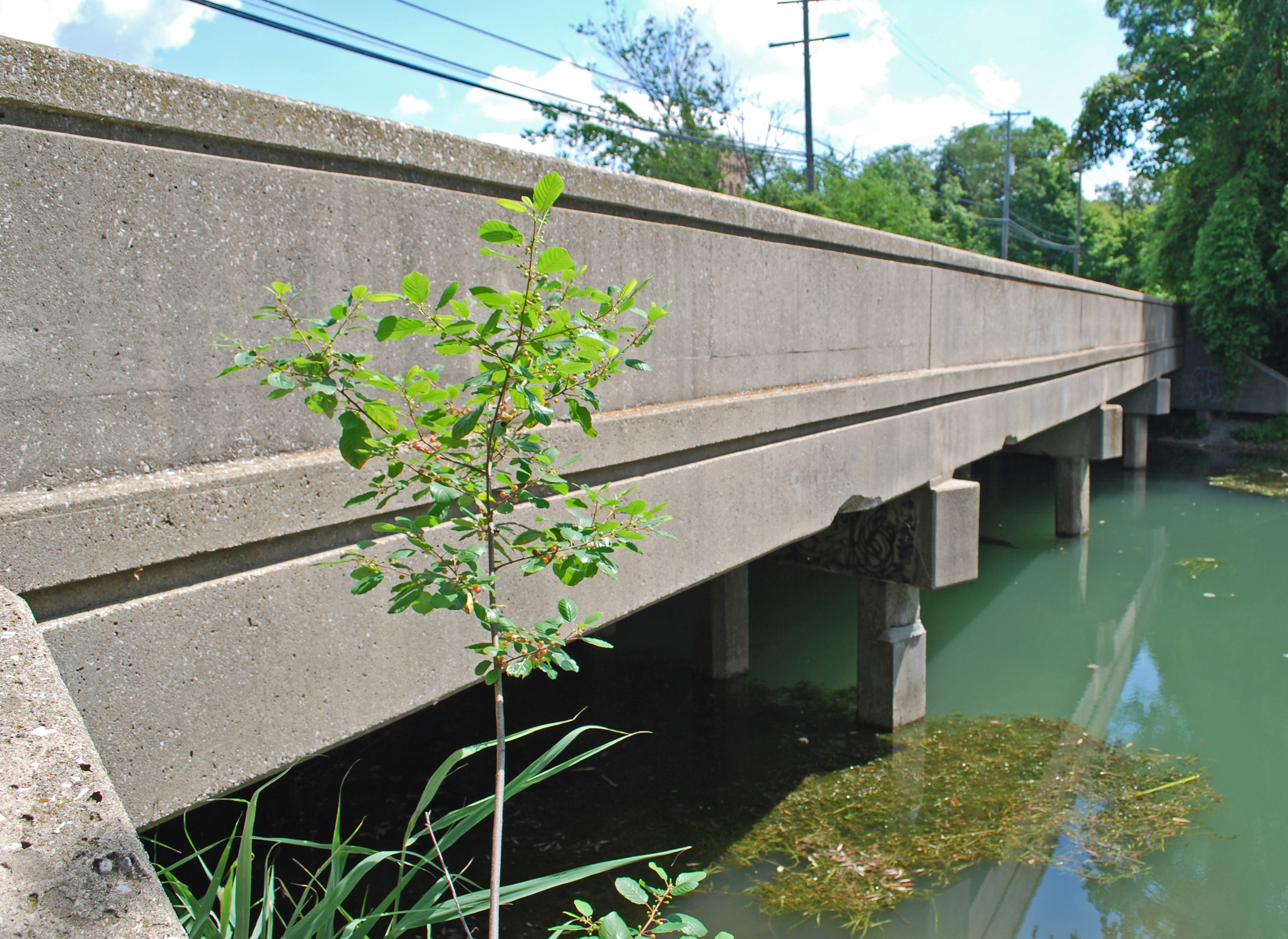
- Underneath bridge

- Location within Michigan Location within the United States
- Interactive map
- Location: Ferry Street over Thorofare Canal, Grosse Ile, Michigan
- Coordinates: 42°8′17″N 83°9′23″W
- Area: 0.9 acres (0.36 ha)
- Built: 1947
- Architect: Wayne County Road Commission
- Architectural style: concrete slab
- MPS: Highway Bridges of Michigan MPS
- NRHP reference No.: 00000118
- Added to NRHP: February 18, 2000

The Ferry Street Bridge or Ferry Street–Thorofare Canal Bridge is a bridge located at Ferry Street over the Thorofare Canal in Grosse Ile, Michigan. It was listed on the National Register of Historic Places in 2000.

== History ==
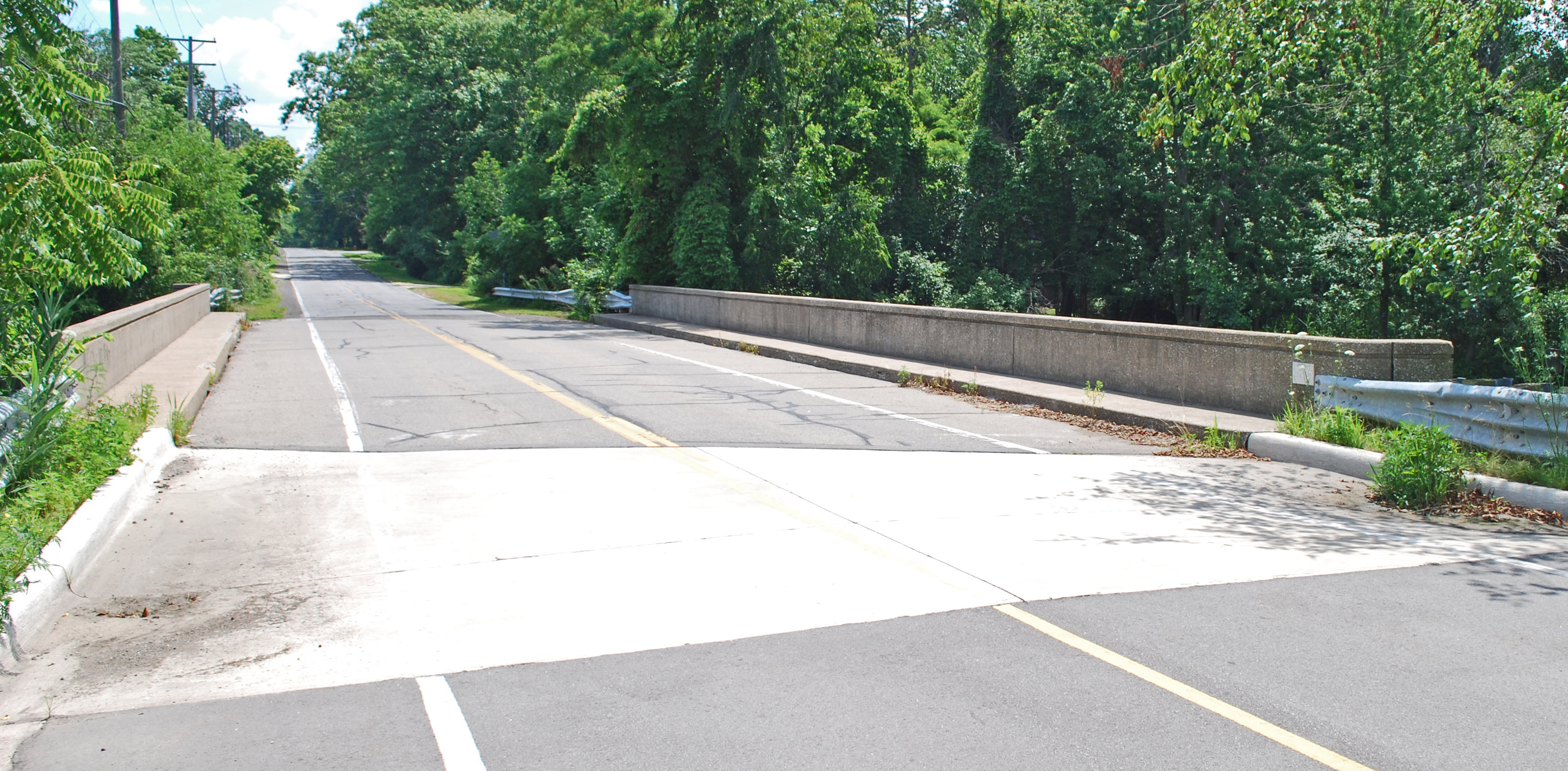
Bridge deck

In 1947, the Wayne County Road Commission replaced the 85-foot (26 m) Pratt truss bridge that had previously spanned the Thorofare Canal with the current structure.

== Description ==
The Ferry Street Bridge has a main span length of 26 feet (7.9 m), a structure length of 95 feet (29 m), a roadway width of 36 feet (11 m), and a structure width of 28 feet (8.5 m). The railings are solid concrete, and marble plates mounted at the northeast and southeast corners of the bridge note that the bridge is Job 413 of the Wayne County Road Commission. Three bents with square concrete posts support the bridge. The bridge is a continuous concrete slab, used by the road commission during World War II and immediately after, presumably due to the difficulty of obtaining steel. The bridge is considered a good representative example of this type of bridge, retaining high integrity.
