= Black Rock Lock =

Marine navigation channel near Buffalo, New York

Coordinates: 42°56′04.4″N 078°54′22.5″W

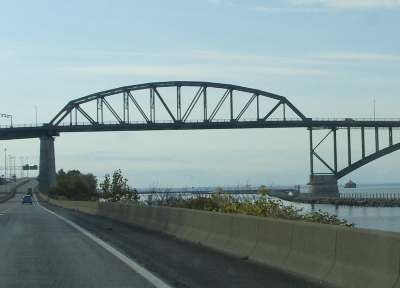
East end of the Niagara Peace Bridge, at Buffalo, and the south end of the Black Rock Canal.

The Black Rock Lock is a ship lock in Buffalo, New York, that allows vessels to bypass rapids on the Niagara River at the outlet of Lake Erie. The lock chamber is 650 feet (200 m) long, 70 feet (21 m) wide, and rises 26 feet (7.9 m). The original lock at Black Rock was built in 1833 following the completion of the Erie Canal. The current, larger lock was completed in 1913.

== History ==
The first lock at Black Rock was constructed in 1833 as part of the Erie Canal. The modern lock was built by the U.S. Army Corps of Engineers from 1908 to 1913. It has the facility to house large Great Lakes vessels that have carried essential goods to business and industry in Western New York. The lock was first rehabilitated in 1975. From 1984 to 1986, the locks guard gates and the operating system were rehabilitated.

Since the 1990s many things have been done to provide a safer work environment, such as the installation of new fencing, railing and ladders. Other things like the refurbishing of the lock houses, and the widening and capping of all concrete approach walls have been done as well.

== Black Rock Channel ==
The Black Rock Channel extends from Buffalo Harbor to the Black Rock Lock. The channel's waterway is 3.5 miles (5.6 km) long. The Black Rock Channel was constructed to provide protection to reefs, rapids and fast currents in the upstream Niagara River. Pleasure craft and commercial vessels can only be 625 feet (191 m) long with drafts to 21 feet (6.4 m) to be allowed in the lock and channel. Although both pleasure craft and commercial vessels are allowed in the channel it is required that the pleasure craft yield the right of way to all commercial vessels.

There are three bridges that cross the channel. They are the Peace Bridge, the Ferry Street Bridge and the International Railroad Bridge. The Peace Bridge is the first bridge that is passed coming from the south entrance of the channel. The Peace Bridge has a clearance of 200 feet (61 m) above Low Water Datum (LWD). The Ferry Bridge is a lift bridge and is the next bridge located 1.9 miles (3.1 km) from the south entrance of the channel. The Ferry Bridge has a clearance of 17.3 above the LWD. Then 3.1 miles (5.0 km) for the south channel entrance comes the International Railroad Bridge. This is a swing bridge which has a clearance of 17 feet (5.2 m) LWD when closed.
