= St. Francis Xavier Roman Catholic Parish Complex =

Historic church in New York, United States

- U.S. National Register of Historic Places
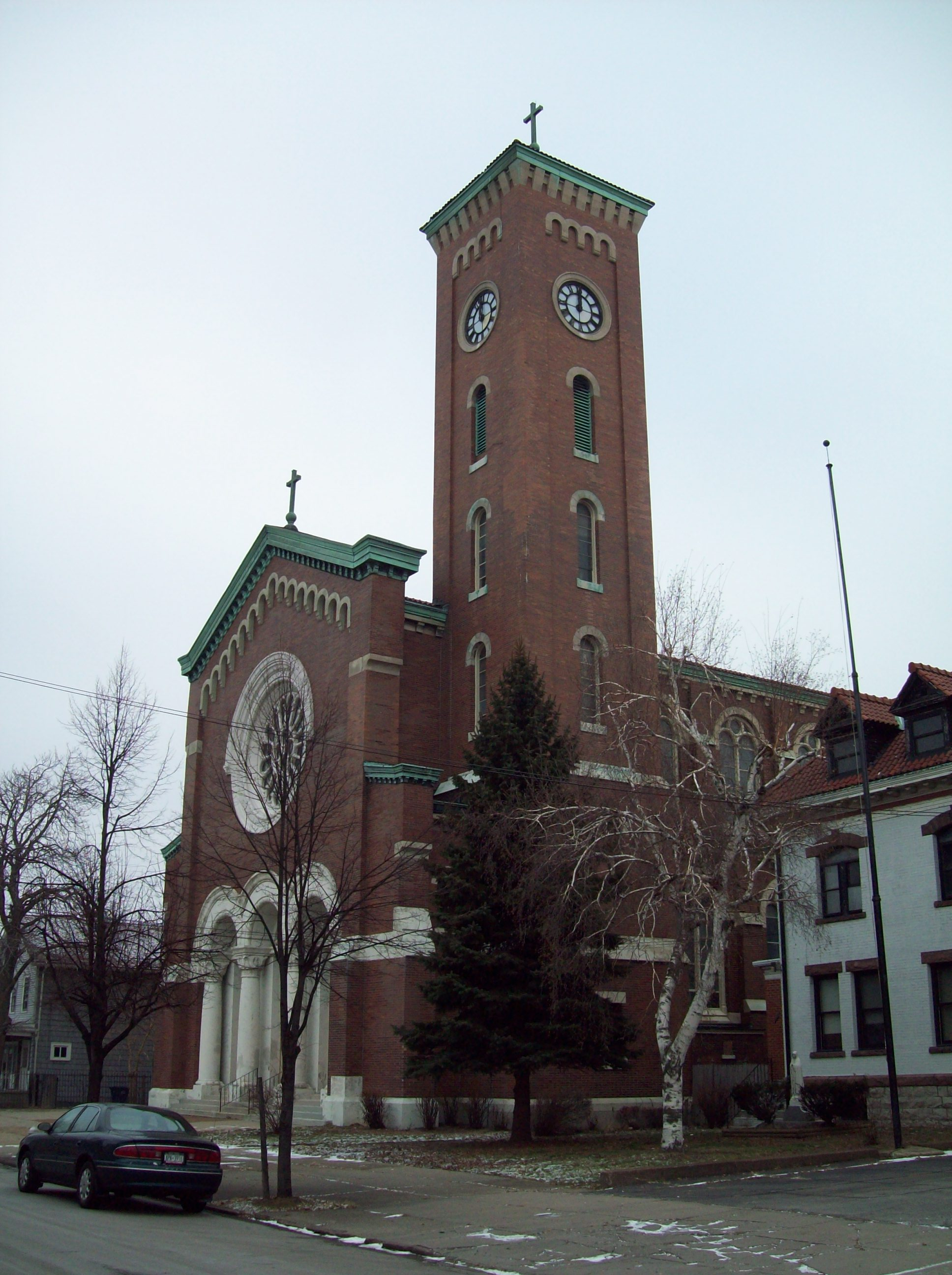
- St. Francis Xavier Roman Catholic Church, December 2009

- Location within New York Location within the United States
- Location: 157 East St., Buffalo, New York
- Coordinates: 42°56′8.57″N 78°54′0.84″W
- Area: 2.2 acres (0.89 ha)
- Built: 1895, 1911-1913
- Architectural style: Romanesque Revival, Queen Anne
- NRHP reference No.: 09000631
- Added to NRHP: August 20, 2009

St. Francis Xavier Roman Catholic Parish Complex is a historic former Roman Catholic church complex located in Buffalo in Erie County, New York.

== Description ==
The St. Francis Xavier complex consists of a Lombard-Romanesque Revival basilica-style church (1911–1913), a Queen Anne style rectory (1895), and a school completed in three phases in 1895, 1906, and 1956. The church measures 156 by 67 feet (48 by 20 m) and is two and one-half stories high with a low-pitched red clay tile roof. A large rose window is centered on the front façade above a triple arched entry. A campanile rises roughly 114 feet (35 m) from the southwest corner of the structure and holds a four-sided clock on its fifth level.

After the Diocese of Buffalo announced in 2007 that the parish would close, the Buffalo Religious Arts Center, a museum that collects religious artifacts from closed churches in Buffalo, bought the property and continues to occupy it.

It was listed on the National Register of Historic Places in 2009.

Ignatius Forness and John Hanbach were two of the founders of St. Francis Xavier Church on East Street in Buffalo, and when the church had its 50th jubilee (note ca 1990), Igantius Forness and one other man were guests of honor as the only surviving founders.

== Gallery ==
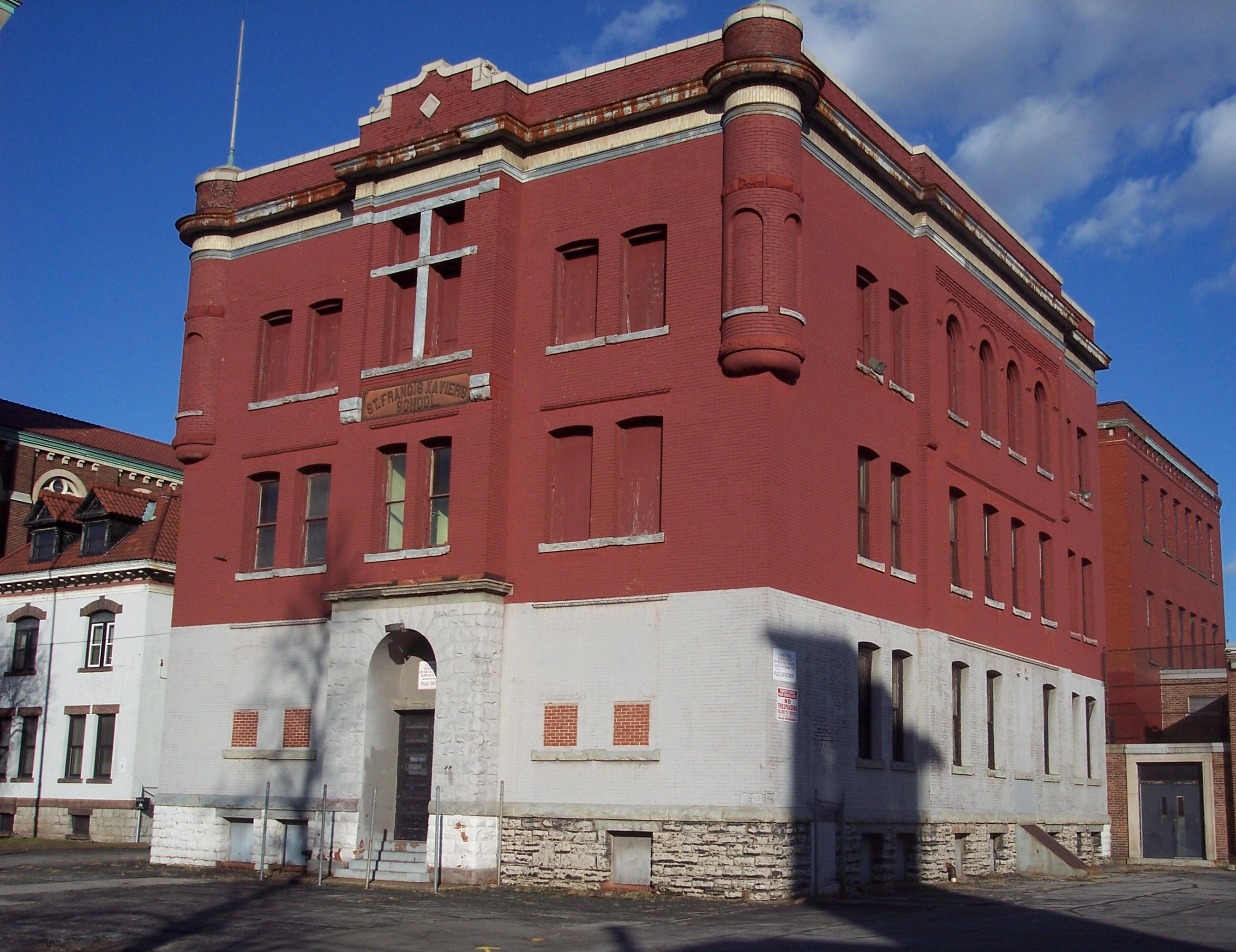
St. Francis Xavier RC School

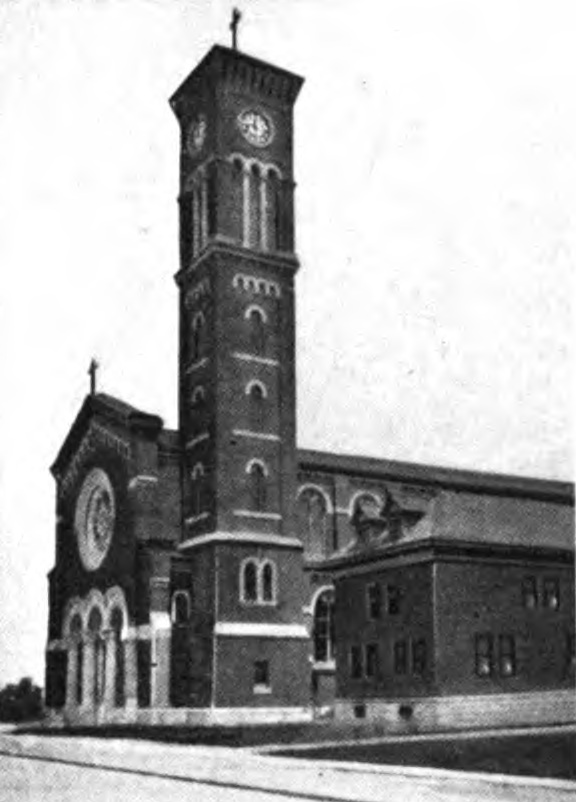
The church as it appeared in a 1914 publication
