= Buffalo Harbor South Entrance Light =

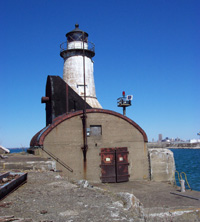
- Buffalo Harbor South Entrance Light, 2005
- Location: Stony Pt. end of Buffalo Harbor S breakwater, Buffalo, New York
- Coordinates: 42°50′0″N 78°52′3″W

Tower
- Constructed: 1903
- Foundation: Timber crib / concrete pier
- Construction: Iron
- Automated: 1935
- Height: 43.5 feet (13.3 m)
- Shape: Conical
- Heritage: National Register of Historic Places listed place

Light
- First lit: 1903
- Deactivated: 1993
- Buffalo Harbor South Entrance Light
- U.S. National Register of Historic Places
- Architect: US Lighthouse Service
- MPS: U.S. Coast Guard Lighthouses and Light Stations on the Great Lakes MPS
- NRHP reference No.: 07001191
- Added to NRHP: November 16, 2007

Buffalo Harbor South Entrance Light, also known as the South Buffalo Southside Light or Buffalo South Breakwater, South Entrance Light Station, is a lighthouse at Stony Point at the entrance to Buffalo Harbor, Buffalo, New York. It was established in 1903 and deactivated in 1993. It was replaced by a nearby modern post light. The lighthouse property consists of a three-story cast iron 43.5-foot (13.3 m) decommissioned light tower topped with a lantern; one-story concrete fog signal building and an L-shaped concrete pier.

It was listed on the National Register of Historic Places in 2007.
