= Ferry Street Bridge (Buffalo) =

Coordinates: 42.9152°N 78.9022°W

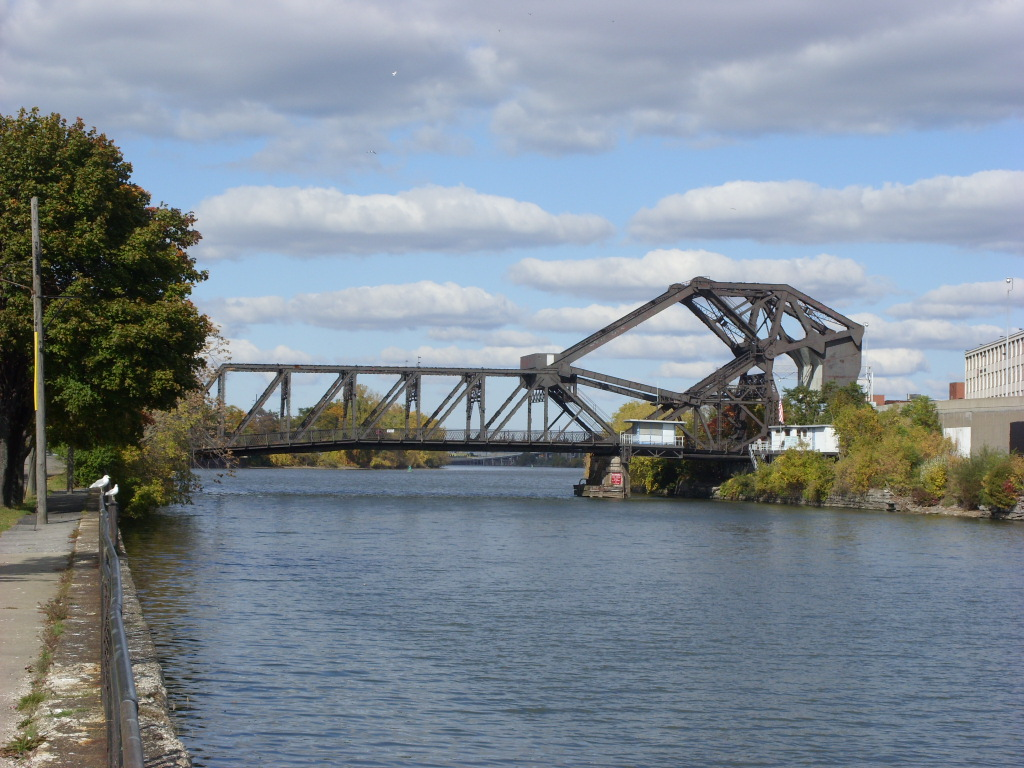
Ferry Street Bridge crosses the Black Rock Canal in Buffalo, NY.

The Ferry Street Bridge was constructed across the Black Rock Canal, in Buffalo, New York, in 1913.

The bridge is a bascule bridge, a kind of lift bridge, built by the Strauss Bascule Bridge Company, and is considered a rare and historic design.

The bridge underwent a rebuild from 2014 to 2016. The rebuild cost $8 million.
