= Unity Island =

Island in Buffalo, New York, United States

Coordinates: 42°55′30″N 78°54′13″W

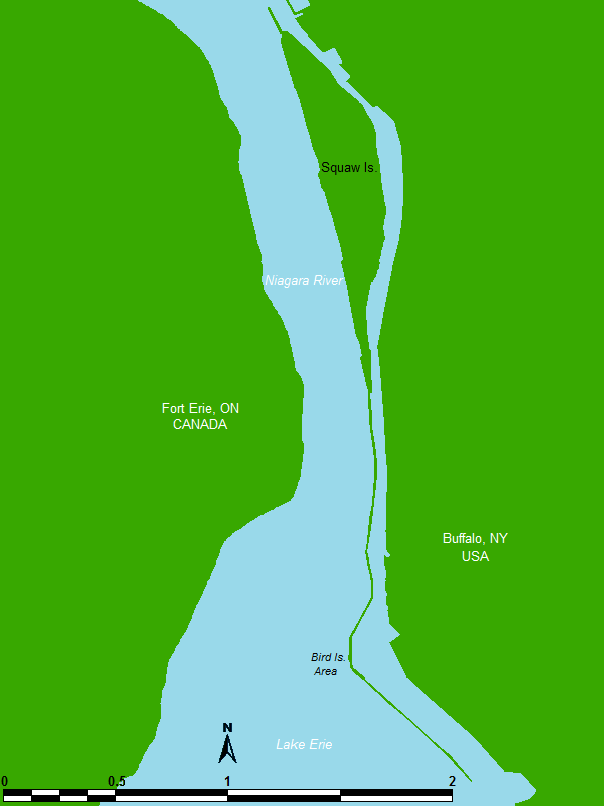
Unity Island (formerly Squaw Island) and the Bird Island Pier

Unity Island is an approximately 160-acre (0.65 km^{2}) island separating the Niagara River and the Black Rock Canal, located within the city limits of Buffalo, New York. The historic island is home to two public parks and a water treatment facility. It is connected to the mainland by a two-span swing bridge.

The island's original name in the Seneca language is Deyowenoguhdoh. From about the time of the War of 1812 to July 2015, the island was also known by the English name, Squaw Island. In June 2015, after being petitioned by Jodi Lynn Maracle, a Mohawk resident of Buffalo, and members of the Seneca Nation of New York, who considered the name to be racist and derogatory toward Native American women, the members of the Buffalo Common Council voted unanimously to change the island's name to Unity Island. The new name was formally adopted by the city in October 2015, with new signs reflecting the name change were installed on the island; the U.S. Board on Geographic Names recognized the new name in May 2017.

== History ==
=== Early history ===
The Seneca people acquired Unity Island and the surrounding areas in the 1650s. They called it Deyowenoguhdoh, meaning "divided island", so-called for a small marshy creek (then known as "Smuggler's Run") that once ran through the property. The name Squaw Island first appeared prior to the War of 1812; however, its origin is unknown. Not until the early 19th century did the island leave the hands of the Seneca Nation. Philip Kenjockety, one of the last of the Neutral Nation and namesake of Scajaquada Creek, owned a corn field on the island at the time of his death in 1808. Kenjockety is known to have traveled the creek that once divided the island by canoe during his travels to and from Canada.

=== HMS Detroit ===
On October 9, 1812, HMS Detroit, a six-gun brig of the Royal Navy, became grounded on the island and was captured by American naval forces on the waters of Lake Erie at Fort Erie during the War of 1812. Light winds and swift waters at the mouth of the Niagara River made it impossible for the Americans to escape British artillery at nearby Fort Erie. After a fierce exchange of gunfire and the exhaustion of American ammunition, the ship was left to the river's current before reaching her unplanned final destination on the island, within range of both British and American batteries. Both the British and Americans contested the grounded Detroit until her battered hulk was set afire and burned by American forces.

The island remained in the hands of the Senecas until 1816, when the Nation gifted the property to Captain Jasper Parrish for his service to them as an agent and interpreter. Parrish later sold the island to local attorney Henry F. Penfield in 1823.

== Current use ==
In later years, Unity Island came into public ownership and its northern end was used as a landfill; the area was eventually capped and turned into today's Unity Island Park. A City of Buffalo water treatment facility began operations on the island in 1938. The facility's construction slightly expanded the size of the island.

=== Broderick Park ===
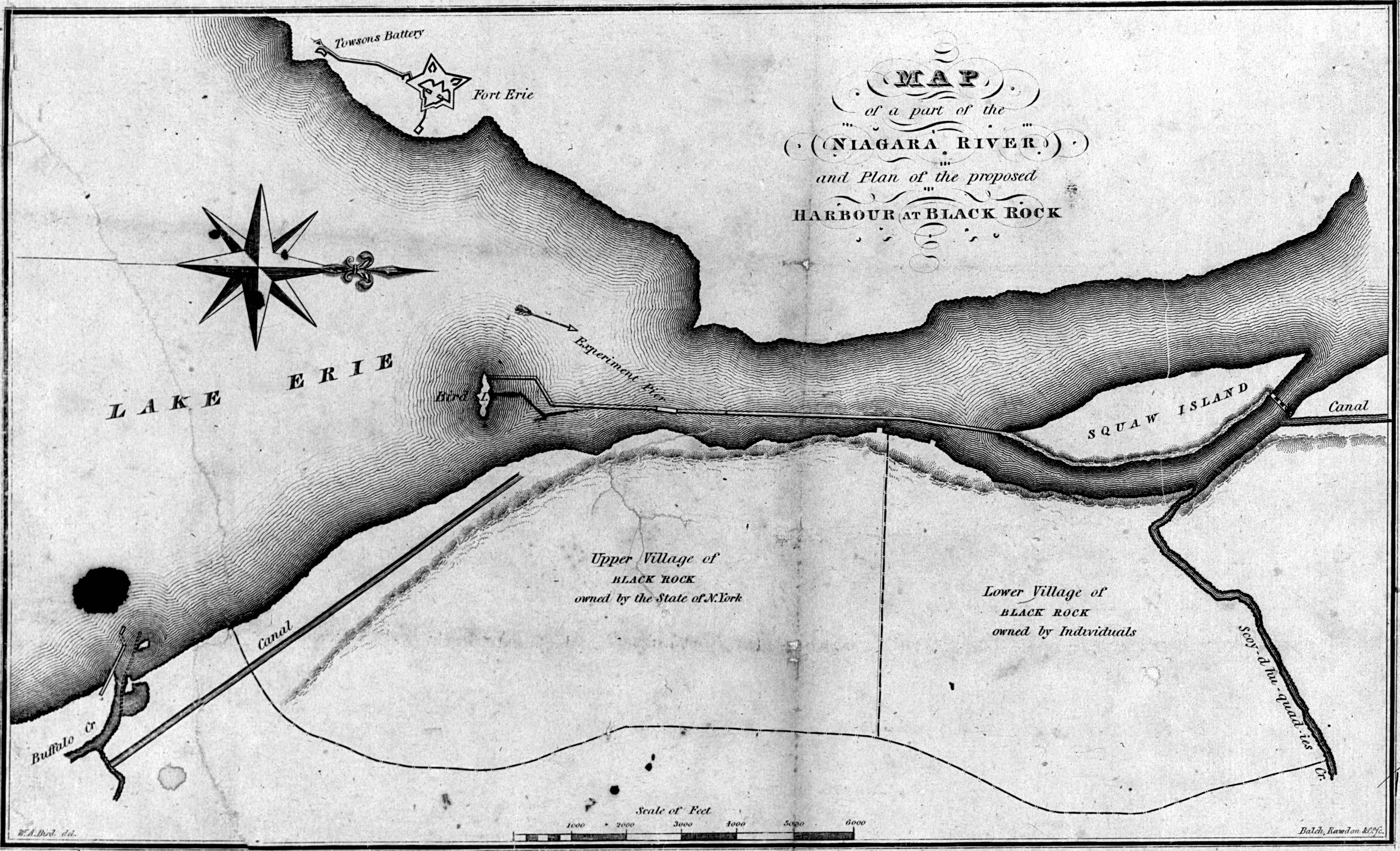
An 1829 map illustrating a proposed harbor on the Niagara River, showing the locations of Bird Island and Unity Island

At the southern tip of Unity Island is Broderick Park, the location of the former Black Rock ferry, a major transportation link across the Niagara River between Buffalo and Fort Erie, Ontario. The ferry operated continuously at that location between 1825 and the middle of the 20th century, when service was discontinued. The ferry's dock along the western edge of the park was used as an Underground Railroad station from at least the 1830s until the American Civil War. Escaped slaves that arrived at the park would take the ferry and other boats from this location across the Niagara River to Canada, thus securing their freedom.

== Bird Island ==
Extending from the southern tip of Unity Island is a long, narrow stone pier known as Bird Island Pier, completed in 1860. The structure once connected Unity Island to the former Bird Island, a small land formation, rocky on its southern end with fertile soil to the north. Kenjockety's father cultivated corn there. The island was noted in the personal journal of DeWitt Clinton, who surveyed the area prior to construction of the Erie Canal. An 1829 map of the Niagara River and proposed Black Rock Harbor illustrates the then-proposed Bird Island Pier connecting Unity Island to Bird Island. By 1880, however, Bird Island had disappeared, the rock which composed it having been used to construct the Black Rock Pier to support the Erie Canal.

== See also ==
- Black Rock, Buffalo
