= The Storm (Buechner novel) =

1998 novel by Frederick Buechner

- Author: Frederick Buechner
- Language: English
- Publisher: HarperCollins
- Publication date: 1998
- Preceded by: On the Road with the Archangel

The Storm is the fourteenth novel by the American author and theologian, Frederick Buechner. The novel was first published in 1998 by Harper, San Francisco.

== Plot summary ==
A reworking of William Shakespeare's The Tempest, The Storm follows the fortunes of Kenzie Maxwell, a wealthy soon-to-be septuagenarian with a complicated past. Retired to a secluded and wealthy island in the State of Florida with his third wife, Willow, Kenzie dwells on the consequences of his midlife crisis. Though twenty years have passed since his affair with a young graffiti artist, Kia, the ramifications of the relationship are seemingly permanent: an irrevocably altered life trajectory, lasting shame and regret, and an irreconcilable conflict with his only brother.

Twenty years previously, Kenzie's increasing sense of purposelessness drove him to seek further meaning beyond his own opulent lifestyle as a successful writer. Having cast about for a productive and charitable outlet, the middle-aged Kenzie had settled at last upon the Alodians mission, a charitable organisation chaired by his older brother, Dalton. Serving the charity in the South Bronx as the editor of their newsletter, Kenzie had earnestly set about to document the sad stories of the homeless and abandoned individuals that frequented the mission, only to meet and fall in love with the seventeen-year-old Kia.

Following a brief and clandestine affair, Kia is found dead, having prematurely given birth to Kenzie's child in the impoverished surroundings of a tenement flat with few amenities. Kenzie, who was unaware of the pregnancy, had subsequently written a distraught letter of confession to his brother. While struggling to come to terms with the responsibility of raising his newly-born daughter, Bree, Kenzie is stunned by his brother’s decision to publish his private confession in the mission newsletter, thereby breaking the news of the scandal, and bringing public disgrace upon himself and, more importantly, his daughter and her mother.

Twenty years hence, the retired writer has become a resident of Plantation Island, where his wife, Willow, lives with her forty-year-old son, Averill. The wealthy Floridian community is presided over by the formidable Miss Sickert, whose prestigious "suppers" are the daunting gateway to the social circle of the resort. As the date of Kenzie's seventieth birthday party approaches, Dalton journeys to the island at the request of Miss Sickert, who requires his assistance in the composition of a will. Also travelling to the island are Dalton's stepson, Nandy, whose relationship with his stepfather threatens to become distant beyond repair, and Bree, who has come to celebrate her father's birthday. By coincidence, a miraculous reunion is brought about when Bree realises that the man sat next to her on the flight to West Palm Beach is her uncle Dalton, and the two travellers are met at the airport by Nandy and Kenzie.

Determined to see the brothers reconciled, Willow despatches Averill with a party invitation to the house of Miss Sickert, where Dalton and his stepson are lodging. Intending on interrogating the dissolute messenger, Miss Sickert is instead dragged into an unwanted existential conversation about her own existence, which raises fears that neither she nor her afternoon guest, the obsequious Bishop Hazelton, are able to allay.

As the day of the party arrives, Nandy proposes an early morning fishing trip with his father, with the hope that this will bring about a long-sought rapprochement. The planned reconciliation appears to have been thwarted when a storm intercepts the boat, reducing it to a wreck, and depositing its two passengers in the sea, as Willow, Bree, and Kenzie watch with horror from the shore. When the latter calls Miss Sickert with news of the apparent tragedy, she is heartbroken, and begins to make her way to Willow's house through the rain. Both Dalton and Nandy are rescued from the surf, neither knowing that the other is still alive, and thus both are given the opportunity to mourn the loss of the other, and are thereby reconciled when they realise that tragedy has been averted. When both Miss Sickert and Bishop Hazelton arrive somewhat bedraggled at the house, they find the family joined together in celebration, their differences resolved and their collective pasts forgiven.

== Characters ==
- Kenzie: a retired writer, disgraced by his public affair with a teenager twenty years previously, Kenzie is prone to deep reflection on the shifting patterns of life. Like Prospero in The Tempest, he suffers a quasi-banishment to Plantation Island, where he perennially feels like a guest in the house of his third wife, Willow, and her forty-year-old son, Averill. Unlike his wife, Kenzie is a firm believer in the numinous. Beset by constant guilt concerning his indiscretion, the ageing writer makes daily entries in a letter, which is by this stage the length of a book, addressed to his tragically deceased lover, Kia. At odds with his past, Kenzie carries a lasting resentment toward his older brother, Dalton, who, as the chair of the charity that Kenzie was volunteering at when he committed the indiscretion, publishes his younger brother's letter of confession in the newsletter.
- Dalton: the older brother of Kenzie, Dalton lives a highly organised life of solitude. Retired from his career as a professor at a law school, he has ambitions of writing a history of Central Park. Unable to understand why Kenzie has not spoken to him in two decades, Dalton avoids his own past, particularly the remembrance of his two breakdowns: the first of which began while performing the role of best man at Kenzie's first wedding; the second of which occurs after the death of his own wife, when he is overcome by existential questions.
- Willow: a wealthy resident of Plantation Island, Willow is the third wife of Kenzie Maxwell, having herself been previously married twice. Kenzie's willingness to believe “anything” is set against her own belief in "nothing". Rather than considering matters existential, Willow instead ponders deeply her own past, remembering the death of her second husband, and wondering at Kenzie's inability to bring about reconciliation with his older brother.
- Bree: born out of Kenzie's indiscretion with a teenage runaway, Kia, Bree's life is characterised by a search for identity. In search of traces of her mother, whose last name is unknown to both her and Kenzie, Bree scours the neighbourhood in New York City where her mother had previously lived. A graffiti artist, Kia is known to have left her signature sprayed in different forms all over her borough, and Bree has combed the area for any sign of her mother's mark, though without success.
- Nandy: the disaffected and feckless stepson of Dalton, Nandy has endured a series of disappointments in his life, culminating in the tragedy of his mother's untimely death. Dropping out of college to embark upon a summer-long bike tour of the continent, the young man has finally settled down to life as a maintenance worker at a golf course.
- Averill: abandoning any ambition towards an ordinary life, the forty-year-old Averill has spent his adulthood windsurfing, meditating, and living off the wealth of his mother, Willow, as a permanent resident at her house. He is, as Dale Brown writes, 'the sort of fellow nobody notices', yet this gives him unusual insight into the lives of fellow inhabitants of the island, whose reverie he disturbs with unwanted existential questions.
- Miss Sickert: 'another of Buechner's almost villains', Violet Sickert is the aged matriarch of Plantation Island. Her famed "suppers" are the recognised point of entry into the social life of the island, where she sees her role as supervisory: '"I try to keep this island afloat like a ship"', she claims, '"that's what I do. I try to make the journey as well run and attractive and civilized as possible"'. Despite her disapproval of Kenzie's past she is beset by her own returning scandal – the well-worn rumour that her servant, Calvert Sykes, is actually her illegitimate son.

== Composition ==
The Storm was published one year after the release of Buechner's thirteenth novel, On the Road with the Archangel (1997). Buechner's works published in the late 1990s and early 2000s suggest a preoccupation with Shakespeare's late romances. In an interview given for the San Diego Weekly Reader in 1997, Buechner revealed his own desire to write novels similar to the late works of Shakespeare, such as The Tempest and The Winter's Tale, having reached the age of seventy. The Tempest, which Dale Brown describes as 'the allusive force' behind The Storm, is a work that Buechner acknowledges as highly influential throughout his writings. Remembering his school years in his first autobiographical work, The Sacred Journey (1982), Buechner writes that he developed an early love for The Tempest. In his literary critical work, Speak What We Feel (2001), published two years after The Storm, the author describes The Tempest as: '[A] fairy tale too good not to be true, where all shadows are finally dispelled and the world seems bathed in a kind of golden haze, as if at the close of his career Shakespeare had reached some kind of golden inner peace within himself.'

Buechner further elucidates this theme in an earlier non-fiction work, Telling the Truth: the Gospel as tragedy, comedy, and fairy tale (1977). Concerning The Tempest, he writes: 'Like the last self-portraits of Rembrandt, where the ravaged old face of the painter smiles out of the shadows, it is as if at the end of his career Shakespeare comes out on the far side of the tragic vision of Lear and Macbeth and speaks into the night a golden word too absurd perhaps to be anything but true, the laughter of things beyond the tears of things.'

== Themes ==
Buechner scholar Dale Brown suggests that The Storm, like its predecessor, On the Road with the Archangel, has a 'valedictory' quality: 'an undertone of goodbye, a kind of joyous sadness that percolates through the very different books, a way of summing up'. The novel is, in line with the rest of Buechner's work, concerned with existential questions. The return of its central character, Kenzie, to church, and his renewed sense of faith, is balanced against his wife's scepticism, as once more faith and doubt find expression in a domestic setting. In addition to the reoccurrence of such topics as God, death, and forgiveness, there is a further fascination with the process and effect of aging, termed by Brown as an emerging 'grief and exuberance': a Shakespearean 'mix of comedy and tragedy'.

== Critical reception ==
Buechner's fourteenth novel was warmly received by critics. In his review, written for the Philadelphia Inquirer, Michael Harrington called The Storm a 'miniature epic' and a 'quiet marvel', concluding that Buechner 'is one of our greatest novelists'. Writing in The World & I, Maude McDaniel reflected more broadly on Buechner's career as a novelist, suggesting that 'ambiguity has become Buechner's stock in trade [….] and is probably the key to his success as a religious writer in the studiedly nonreligious culture of the last half of the twentieth century'. Within this line of thinking McDaniel argued that The Storm represents 'the most ambiguous of all his books'.

Several critics noted the author's use of The Tempest as a touchstone for the novel. In a review published in the New York Times, Ruth Coughlin wrote that Buechner, 'a well regarded writer', had published 'a contemporary tale of redemption'. She continues: 'Drawing on both his literary and religious credentials, he has used his latest novel to reinterpret The Tempest'. Writing for the Fort-Worth Star-Telegram, Larry Swindell called The Storm an 'entirely wonderful [example of a] paraphrase of Shakespeare', while the Kirkus Review found it to be 'a wonderfully humane and satisfying meditative romance', containing 'a fascinating set of variations on the Shakespearean source, expressed in spare, simple declarative sentences that propel the story forward with commendable swiftness.' The reviewer further noted Buechner's 'skilful' movement between 'the viewpoints of several major characters', before concluding that the novel constitutes 'A marvelous adaptation of Shakespeare—one of the best ever.'
