= The Faces of Jesus =

1974 book by Frederick Buechner

- Author: Frederick Buechner
- Language: English
- Publisher: Simon and Schuster, NY
- Publication date: 1974
- Preceded by: Wishful Thinking: a theological ABC
- Followed by: Telling the Truth: the Gospel as tragedy, comedy, and fairy tale

The Faces of Jesus: a life story is a collection of meditations by Frederick Buechner on the life and person of Jesus Christ. The work gathers and discusses a selection of artistic portrayals of Jesus, including a variety of forms, from tapestry to sculpture. Published in 1974 by Simon and Schuster, Faces of Jesus is Buechner’s fifth non-fiction work.

== Composition ==
In his autobiographical work, Now and Then (1983), Buechner recalls being asked to "supply a text to accompany a beautifully reproduced set of color photographs of various attempts over the centuries to depict the likeness of Christ". The author describes the visual content as "rich and varied", including "primitive African carvings, Renaissance paintings, medieval tapestries and vestments, a scrimshaw crucifixion, a head of Jesus painted on the slatted overhead door of a garage". "Some of them", Buechner writes, were "deeply moving, some of them tasteless and terrible, some of them fascinatingly both".

The author compares the composition of his fifth non-fiction work to that of his fourth and seventh. In The Faces of Jesus, he writes, "I responded to the pictures, just as in Wishful Thinking and Peculiar Treasures I responded to my memories of teaching at Exeter". Concerning writing as “response” to material and memory, Buechner writes that the work is not "in any sense either a scholar’s life of Christ or a complete life, but as much of a life as emerged from the pictures themselves."

== Themes ==
Buechner scholar Dale Brown writes that The Faces of Jesus represents the author’s "single foray into the coffee-table genre". It is perhaps unsurprising, however, that Buechner would choose to take on the project, since incarnation, as Marjorie Casebier McCoy writes, "is an underlying theme in all Buechner’s work". Despite its more casual nature, the work is still redolent with the themes that are common throughout Buechner’s work. Brown identifies these as the search for meaning, the quest for self-identity, the ambiguities of life, and belief versus unbelief. This is presence of these themes is especially apparent in the introduction, which the author begins with the phrase: "Whoever he was or was not, whoever he thought he was, whoever he has become in the memories of men since and will go on becoming for as long as men remember him – exalted, sentimentalized, debunked, made and remade to the measure of each generation’s desire, dread, indifference – he was a man once, whatever else he may have been".
