= The Longing for Home =

1996 book by Frederick Buechner

- Author: Frederick Buechner
- Language: English
- Publisher: HarperCollins
- Publication date: 1996
- Followed by: Speak What We Feel

The Longing for Home: Recollections and Reflections is an anthology of sermons, poetry, devotional pieces, essays, and autobiographical reflections authored by Frederick Buechner. Published in 1996 by HarperCollins, The Longing for Home is Buechner's twelfth non-fiction work.

== Composition ==
The author structures the anthology into two sections: 'Part 1: The Home We Knew'; and 'Part 2: The Home We Dream'. The pieces in part one are largely autobiographical, with reflections in prose and poetry on Buechner's childhood memories of certain family members. The section also includes a letter to the author's grandson, an historical account of a house and mill local to his home in Vermont, and an essay on Rinkitink in Oz. Part two includes a number of sermons, devotional pieces, and essays, which, as Buechner writes in his introduction to the anthology, are 'aimed particularly at men and women who every Sunday face the task of somehow showing forth from the pulpit that these are not just theological ideas but are as real as they, the preachers, themselves are real.' Dale Brown notes that within the anthology there are also a number of literary critical pieces, as the author 'uses the nonfiction as a way to reflect on earlier works of fiction'. In The Longing for Home Buechner considers a number of his own works, including Treasure Hunt (1977), Godric (1980), Brendan (1987), and The Son of Laughter (1993).

== Themes ==
Buechner scholar Jeffrey Munroe differentiates The Longing for Home from Buechner's other 'grab bag' anthologies, such as A Room Called Remember and The Clown in the Belfry, noting that this work has a single 'unifying theme': 'home'. Dale Brown writes that, in The Longing for Home, Buechner 'owns up to the possibility that his entire career has been a search for home, an attempt to fill that something missing in himself.' Brown further places the collection within the move towards a 'loosening of the tongue' that is characteristic of Buechner's work from 1980 onwards, finding within it a similar 'willingness to tell his own story'. Noting this same thread, Munroe suggests that the work belongs in a category with the author's other autobiographical publications, writing that The Longing for Home has 'many memoirish elements'. Brown also argues that, throughout the anthology, the author returns to a familiar theme that runs throughout his work, 'the possibility of transcendence' within the ordinary.
