= Wishful Thinking (book) =

- Author: Frederick Buechner
- Language: English
- Genre: Dictionary
- Publisher: Harper and Row, NY
- Publication date: 1973
- Preceded by: The Alphabet of Grace
- Followed by: The Faces of Jesus: a life story

Wishful Thinking: a theological ABC, reissued in 1993 as Wishful Thinking: a seeker’s ABC, is a collection of meditations on faith, Christianity, and theology by Frederick Buechner. It is the first of Buechner’s lexical trilogy, which includes Peculiar Treasures (1979) and Whistling in the Dark (1988). Published in 1973 by Harper and Row, Wishful Thinking is Buechner’s fourth non-fiction work.

== Composition ==
In his autobiographical work, Now and Then (1983), Buechner reveals that, as had been the case with several of his first non-fiction works, Wishful Thinking was inspired by his time as a teacher and chaplain at the Phillips Exeter Academy: a ‘respon[se] to my memories of teaching at Exeter’. He writes that ‘a great deal’ of his teaching ‘involved no more than simply trying to clarify the meaning of some of the great religious words’. This was necessary, he continues, because ‘many of the boys I taught had picked up what struck me as such distortions of those words that they seemed entirely justified in rejecting them’. It was from this need to educate by redefinition that produced the material that eventually became Wishful Thinking.

== Themes ==
Buechner’s definition of the term ‘Wishful Thinking’ in the book reveals a number of its themes. ‘Christianity is mainly wishful thinking’, he writes: ‘Even the part about Judgement and Hell reflects the wish that somewhere the score is being kept’. As with many of Buechner’s works, central to Wishful Thinking is the mysterious nature of faith, the justifiableness of doubt, and the presence of God in the mundane. Additionally, however, the author also meditates on the possibility of faith; ‘Sometimes wishing is the wings the truth comes on’, he concludes: ‘sometimes the truth is what sets us wishing for it’. Jeffrey Munroe designates the work as 'more of an apologia for faith than [a] systematic theological statement'. Buechner scholar, Dale Brown, claims that Wishful Thinking is ‘nearly impossible to clarify’. Despite this, he notes that the book greatly ‘increased Buechner’s notoriety’, because many of its ‘tart definitions and theological turns’ were ‘excerpted in Reader’s Digest’.

In his ‘Author’s Note’ at the opening of the volume, Buechner introduces Wishful Thinking as a ‘mongrel litter by Pascal’s Pensées, out of Voltaire’s Dictionnaire Philosophique, via The Devil’s Dictionary of Ambrose Bierce’. Buechner also lists C. S. Lewis, W. T. Stace, Paul Tillich, David H. C. Read, James Muilenberg, and Agnes Sanford as influential for the content of the volume. Dale Brown notes a particular continuity between Wishful Thinking and several of Buechner’s other works, writing that ‘many of the passages in The Alphabet of Grace and The Entrance to Porlock will actually show up in edited forms in Wishful Thinking’. Marjorie Casebier McCoy finds commonality in tone between the work and Buechner’s tetralogy, The Book of Bebb; she writes that the book is emblematic of ‘the Bebbsian whimsy that has grasped Buechner’, and that this ‘enabled him to revivify with angular insight and delightful humor notions that had become far too heavy to convey their “heavenly” meaning’.
