= Frederick Buechner bibliography =

This is a list of published works by writer and theologian Frederick Buechner.

== Fiction ==
- A Long Day's Dying, 1950 (ISBN 978-0972429542)
- The Seasons' Difference, 1952
- The Return of Ansel Gibbs, 1958
- The Final Beast, 1965 (ISBN 9780060611590)
- The Entrance to Porlock, 1970 (ISBN 9780701116026)
- The Book of Bebb (tetralogy), 1979 (ISBN 9780062517692)
  - Lion Country, 1971 (ISBN 9780701117931)
  - Open Heart, 1972 (ISBN 9780689104985)
  - Love Feast, 1974 (ISBN 9780689106125)
  - Treasure Hunt, 1977 (ISBN 978-0701122980)
- Godric, 1980 (ISBN 9780060611620)
- Brendan, 1987 (ISBN 9780060611781)
- The Wizard's Tide: A Story, 1990 (later re-released as The Christmas Tide, 2005) (ISBN 9781596270183)
- The Son of Laughter, 1993 (ISBN 9780062501172)
- On the Road with the Archangel, 1997 (ISBN 9780060611255)
- The Storm, 1998 (ISBN 9780060611453)

== Memoir ==
- The Sacred Journey: A Memoir of Early Days, 1982 (ISBN 9780060611835)
- Now and Then: A Memoir of Vocation, 1983 (ISBN 9780060611828)
- Telling Secrets: A Memoir, 1991 (ISBN 9780060611811)
- The Eyes of the Heart: A Memoir of the Lost and Found, 1999 (ISBN 9780062516398)

== Nonfiction ==
- The Magnificent Defeat, 1966 (ISBN 9780060611743)
- The Hungering Dark, 1968 (ISBN 9780060611750)
- The Alphabet of Grace, 1970 (ISBN 9780060611798)
- Wishful Thinking: a seeker's ABC, 1973 (ISBN 9780060611392)
- The Faces of Jesus: a life story, 1974 (ISBN 9781612615905)
- Telling the Truth: the Gospel as tragedy, comedy, and fairy tale, 1977 (ISBN 9780060611569)
- Peculiar Treasures: a Biblical who's who, 1979 (ISBN 9780060611415)
- A Room Called Remember, 1984 (ISBN 9780060611859)
- Whistling in the Dark: a doubter's dictionary, 1988 (ISBN 9780060611408)
- The Clown in the Belfry: Writings on Faith and Fiction, 1992 (ISBN 9780060611842)
- Listening to Your Life: Daily Meditations with Frederick Buechner, 1992 (ISBN 9780060698645)
- The Longing for Home: Recollections and Reflections, 1996 (ISBN 9780060611910)
- Speak What We Feel (Not What We Ought to Say): Reflections on Literature and Faith, 2001 (ISBN 9780062517531)
- Beyond Words: Daily Readings in the ABC's of Faith, 2004 (ISBN 9780060574468)
- Secrets in the Dark: a life in sermons, 2006 (ISBN 978-0-06-084248-2)
- The Yellow Leaves: A Miscellany, 2008 (ISBN 978-0-664-23276-4)
- Buechner 101: Essays and Sermons by Frederick Buechner, 2014 (ISBN 9780990871903)
- The Remarkable Ordinary: How to Stop, Look, and Listen to Life, 2017 (ISBN 9780310351900)
- A Crazy, Holy Grace: The Healing Power of Pain and Memory, 2017 (ISBN 9780310349761))

== Poetry ==
- Bred In The Bone: An Anthology, 1945 (student poems commemorating the end of WWII / Princeton University / 325 printed)
- The Fat Man's Prescriptions I-IX, 1947 (poetry)
- Family Scenes, 1974 (poetry)
- Follensby Pond, 1983 (poetry)
- Found, date unknown (poetry, Lecture To a Book Of The Month Club)

== Secondary literature ==
- Marie-Helene Davies. Laughter in a Genevan Gown: The Works of Frederick Buechner 1970–1980. (1983) (ISBN 9780802819697)
- Marjorie Casebier McCoy. Frederick Buechner: Novelist and Theologian of the Lost and Found. (1988) (ISBN 9780060653293)
- Victoria S. Allen. Listening to Life: Psychology and Spirituality in the Writings of Frederick Buechner. (2002) (ISBN 9781561677269)
- Dale Brown. The Book of Buechner: A Journey Through His Writings. (2006) (ISBN 9780664231132)
