= On the Road with the Archangel =

1997 novel by Frederick Buechner

- Author: Frederick Buechner
- Publisher: HarperCollins
- Publication date: 1997
- Preceded by: The Son of Laughter
- Followed by: The Storm

On the Road with the Archangel is the thirteenth novel by the American author and theologian, Frederick Buechner. The novel was first published in 1997 by Harper, San Francisco.

== Plot summary ==
Privy to the lives of all humans, the Archangel Raphael enters into the worlds of two households: the family of Tobit, and the family of Raguel.

The ageing Tobit and his wife Anna, who have been exiled in Nineveh, are almost overwhelmed by the turns that their life together has taken. Tasked with oversight of a commercial enterprise owned by the King of Assyria, Sargon II, Tobit is able to provide a comfortable life for his family. Not content to lie low in this foreign and dangerous land, however, the merchant makes the life of his family precarious by his nightly activities. When the King and his murderous son, Sennacherib, leave the corpses of Jews out in the streets or on refuse tips, Tobit rescues the bodies and facilitates a proper burial. Returning from one such nocturnal mission, Tobit falls asleep in his own courtyard. While he is sleeping a sparrow defecates on his face, and when he wakes it is to find that he is blind. Where he once saved the bodies of his fellow Jews and gave the poor among them money, now Tobit is reduced to a life of angry passivity, while his exasperated wife is forced to take up sewing for prosperous families of the neighbourhood.

The lives of Raguel, his wife, Edna, and his daughter, Sarah, are no less unfortunate. Afraid of arranged marriage and the ‘embrace of a virtual stranger’, the beautiful young Sarah has made a Faust-like pact with a demon named Asmodeus. Edna’s zeal to have her daughter married ensures that she is approached by many men, all of whom desire her hand. Each new husband is found dead in the morning, and, by the time the number has risen to seven, she is suicidal with regret. Ecbatana, their hometown, is filled with suspicious chatter, and Sarah’s reputation, and with it the reputation of her family, has been shattered. Her prayer to the Almighty that he might end her life coincides with Tobit’s prayer that God might do the same, and it is Raphael who carries their morbid requests into the presence of God.

Convinced that God will answer his macabre prayer, Tobit begins preparations for an imminent death. Chief among those he must make ready for this eventuality is his son, Tobias, who has ‘always been somewhat slower to understand things than most people’. For the preservation of the household, Tobit insists that his son must set out on a journey to the home of an old friend, Gabael, in far-off Media, with whom the crafty old merchant has hidden two sacks of silver. As Tobias sets out on the road he is met by a stranger, Azarias, who is mysteriously well acquainted with both with Media and Gabael. Unbeknown to Tobias, his new companion is the Archangel Raphael, who has taken it upon himself to step down into the material world in order to bring about a reversal in fortune for this beleaguered family.

Before long, the disguised archangel realises the wisdom of his decision to join Tobias. While Azarias fishes in the Tigris for their supper one evening, his naïve companion, who has taken to swimming in the deep water, becomes embroiled in a life and death struggle with a large fish. Following the fight, in which Tobias himself is nearly killed, Azarias directs him to remove the innards from the great fish, and stow them away in a bag, claiming that they might have some future use. As the two travellers enter Ecbatana, Azarias informs Tobias of his plan to see the young man married to Sarah, the beautiful daughter of a friend of his named Raguel. Despite his initial fear of the proposition, having heard tale of Sarah and her husbands, Tobias agrees to enter into the marriage contract. Azarias’s suggestion that the bridegroom burn some of the fish entrails before heading into the bridal chamber results in the final defeat of Asmodeus, who is overpowered by the smoke and sent fleeing from the scene. The family rejoice in the morning when they find the newlyweds alive and happy.

When Azarias, who has been despatched to Media by Tobias, returns with Tobit’s silver in hand, the new couple begin their journey back to Nineveh. Tobit and Anna, who have begun to fear that their son has met his death, are transported by joy at his return with his new wife. Once more at the direction of Azarias, Tobias makes use of his fermented fish entrails, rubbing them on the eyes of his blind father. The miraculous return of Tobit’s sight is cause for further joy, and the novel closes as Raphael privately reveals his true identity to Tobias, encouraging him as he departs to continue in his father’s charitable ways.

== Characters ==
- Raphael/Azarias: A kindly, wise, and powerful angelic figure, whose foremost responsibility is to see that the prayers of humans reach the presence of God. Leaving the six other archangels to carry out this task, Raphael, who narrates the novel, enters into the lives of the other characters as the mysterious traveller, Azarias. He watches over and advises the young Tobias in his journey, and by his gentle direction brings about an end to the curse of Sarah, the marriage of Sarah and Tobias, the retrieval of Tobit’s family silver, and finally an end to Tobit’s blindness.
- Tobit: a gruff and melancholy individual, who blames God for the exile of his family, his own blindness, and the resulting misfortune that descends upon his household. Convinced that God is merely a “score keeper”, Tobit engages himself daily in the practice of working up good deeds in order to keep the Almighty’s punishing hand at bay. Despite his pessimistic outlook, the old man is unwaveringly charitable, interning the bodies of Jews that have been brutalised by the Assyrian king, and quietly offering financial assistance to families that are in need.
- Anna: the wife of Tobit, Anna is resourceful and shrewd. When he is struck blind she takes upon herself the burden of providing for the household, utilising her skills with a thread and needle begin an embroidering business, catering for wealthy families in the neighbourhood.
- Raguel: convinced that God does not exist, Raguel’s outlook is one of pessimistic scepticism. He suffers greatly while watching his daughter’s suffering as, one by one, her husbands die, and her reputation is destroyed within their hometown. His youth, and even his faith, are revived, however, by the coming of Tobias and Azarias, who between them end the curse that lies upon his family, and bring happiness to his daughter.
- Edna: though she appears cold, calculated, and unfeeling, Edna is in actuality deeply concerned with the future of her daughter. Her concern, however, leads her into attempts to control Sarah’s life, arranging unsuitable marriages for her, which are continuously frustrated.
- Tobias: young and impressionable, Tobias is prone to daydreaming and flights of fancy. This earns him a reputation for being simple minded and naïve – a reputation that he will eventually dislodge as, with the help of his travelling companion and mentor, Azarias, he wins a beautiful wife, brings an end to her curse, retrieves his family’s silver, and cures his father’s blindness.
- Sarah: renowned for her beauty, Sarah is terrified at the prospect of marriage. Her mother’s constant attempts to see her paired with the men of Ecbatana prompts her to make a Faust-like pact with a demon, Asmodeus. As Asmodeus proceeds to murder her first husband, and her six subsequent husbands, she is so weighted down by the situation that she becomes suicidal. When Tobias arrives in Ecbatana with his mysterious friend, Azarias, he brings with him a new life, and an end to her oppression at the hands of Asmodeus.

== Themes ==
Buechner scholar Dale Brown describes On the Road with the Archangel as ‘a kind of valedictory piece’, an ‘encore visit to several of Buechner’s concerns – theories of God, notions of grace and forgiveness, the weightiness of guilt, and the need for acceptance’. Buechner’s return to a first-person narrator, in the form of the Archangel Raphael, is marked by a difference in tone and perspective. Whereas doubt-filled prior narrators, in describing the lives and actions of their God-struck fellow-travellers, have given expression to the scepticism of the reader, the Archangel who ‘pass[es] in and out of the presence of the Holy One’ cannot be a repository for doubt. Rather than using his narrator as a means of voicing scepticism, Buechner’s archangel comments on, and relays, the doubts of the other characters, offering statements about the nature of God with a gentle, authoritative confidence. With this new narrative voice the author is able to present a perspective on theological questions concerning suffering, and God’s goodness and sovereignty that is unique to his previous novels.

== Composition ==
On the Road with the Archangel was published four years after the release of Buechner’s twelfth novel, The Son of Laughter (1993). In the intervening years the author published a single collection of essays, reflections, and poetry, titled The Longing for Home: recollections and reflections (1996). Buechner’s dedication of the anthology to his five grandsons reveals the author’s transition into a new phase of life, as does the dedication at the opening of On the Road with the Archangel, which reads: ‘To the memory of James Merrill, who spoke with archangels, and a friendship of fifty-five years’. Merrill, a Pulitzer Prize winning poet, had died in 1995. A childhood friend of Buechner’s, as young men the two writers had spent the summer of 1948 writing together. Merrill even contributing a line to Buechner's first novel, A Long Day’s Dying (1950). Concerning the inspiration for the novel, in an interview given to the San Diego Weekly Reader the author said:

I had my seventieth birthday two summers ago, and I began thinking about things people write when they get to be old codgers. I thought about Shakespeare. I thought about how at the end of his life he wrote these wonderful sort of fairy tale plays like The Tempest and The Winter’s Tale, and everything ends up wonderfully, and it’s sort of too good not to be true. I cast about for something like that kind of fairy tale, and something drew me to the Book of Tobit, which I’d read before, and I’d decided it was not my thing. But all of a sudden it was. It would be my sort of Tempest or Winter’s Tale.

Buechner’s novelisation of the Book of Tobit is anticipated in his meditations on the figure of Tobias in earlier works. Originally published in Peculiar Treasures: a Biblical who’s who (1979), and subsequently republished in Listening to Your Life: daily meditations with Frederick Buechner (1992), and Beyond Words: daily readings in the ABC’s of faith (2004), the author’s reflections reveal a sustained fascination with the story of Tobias: '[T]he best part of the story is the short, no-nonsense prayer with which he married her. "And now I take not this my sister for lust, but in truth," he said. "Command that I and she may find mercy and grow old together. Amen" (Tobit 8:8- 9). Never has the knot been more securely or simply or eloquently tied.'

== Critical reception ==
On the Road with the Archangel was well received by reviewers in both the Washington Post and New York Times. Writing for the former, George Garrett concluded that the novel ‘sings and dances’, and that the author is ‘as good as we have’. In his New York Times review of the novel, Alfred Corn found that Buechner’s latest work ‘works to justify the ways of God to man by implying that adversities are sometimes remedied, and that curses can never rival the steadying power given us when we praise being’. He continues:

This clergyman can tell a story that has a theological dimension without sounding sanctimonious or trite, partly because his writing style is based on contemporary speech and partly because his turn of mind is ironic, unsentimental. He's been able to update Mark Twain's sense of comedy, so that his books, no matter how exotic the setting or characters, always sound idiomatically American.

Buechner scholar Dale Brown judged the style of the novel to be innovative, writing that it has ‘a fairy-tale quality that is new in Buechner, a lightness that seems a break from the three preceding novels’. Despite this apparent break in style from his previous works, Brown was also careful to note the thematic continuity within Buechner’s novels of the decade: 'Buechner’s work of the mid-1990s continues his preoccupation with infusing the old stories with new vitality, wondering about the lives of near-saints, studying ambiguity, admitting mixed feelings, and exploring still the flow between memoir and fiction.'

In her review published in America, Patricia DeLeeuw pointed out that, again, here Buechner had found ‘his favourite theme in an ancient source’, while David Stewart, writing for Christianity Today, suggested that Buechner’s ‘distinctive gift lies in giving voice to the streak of ambiguity that runs through human existence’. Stewart concludes that: ‘amid the ambiguity that is our lot, the Almighty is at work, quietly and profoundly’. In a review written for the San Diego Weekly Reader Judith Moore concurs with this sentiment, writing that On the Road with the Archangel makes the reader ‘want to fall on your knees and kiss the damp earth, you’re just so glad to be alive’.
