= The Eyes of the Heart (book) =

Autobiography by Frederick Buechner

- Author: Frederick Buechner
- Language: English
- Genre: Autobiography
- Publisher: HarperSanFrancisco
- Publication date: 1999
- Preceded by: Telling Secrets

The Eyes of the Heart: A Memoir of the Lost and Found is the fourth of four partial autobiographies written by Frederick Buechner. Published in 1999, the work moves between a number of vignettes from the author's life, remembering friendships, and imagining conversations with lost family members.

== Overview ==
Buechner's fourth memoir begins with a description of his study, "the Magic Kingdom", which, he explains, was named "as a kind of joke – part Disneyland, part the Land of Oz". The author uses objects in the study, photographs, paintings, pieces of sculpture, books, and furniture, as a way into discussing memories of particular moments, people, and occasions associated with them. In his description, Buechner gives the names of a number of the authors whose books feature on his shelves and have formed his work. These include Herman Melville, Lancelot Andrewes, John Donne, Jonathan Swift, Henry James, Mark Twain, and Anthony Trollope. Concerning the latter, he writes:

It is the sound of Trollope's voice that I think I cherish most about him. He never rants or preaches or sobs like Dickens. He is rarely ironic or arch like Jane Austen, or tongue-in-cheek like Thackeray, whom he knew and much admired. He simply goes on speaking unostentatiously, clearly, honestly, as if there is all the time in the world for telling us everything he wants us to know in order to spin out his tale.

Several of the books prompt Buechner to recall the process of researching his tenth, eleventh, and twelfth novels – Godric (1980), Brendan (1987), and The Son of Laughter (1993). The author also remembers in detail the summer spent writing his first novel, A Long Day's Dying (1950), in the company of his friend, the poet James Merrill. Buechner considers his lifelong friendship with Merrill, culminating in the poet's death in 1995, and their final phone call on the previous day:

He was having some difficulty breathing, but otherwise sounded entirely himself. He said he was glad that whatever was happening to him was happening far from home where he wouldn't be "smothered with concern," as he put it. He said that he was in no serious pain and that when they had given him some Welch's grape juice sorbet earlier in the day, it had tasted so good to him he had asked for another. He asked me to stay in touch with his mother and sent his love to my wife. I told him I would say some powerful prayers for him, and he said, "That is exactly what I want you to do." He called me "my dearest friend," which I couldn't remember his ever having done before, and when I phoned the next morning to find out how things were going with him, I was told that he had died a few hours earlier. It was only then that I realized that the purpose of his call had of course been to say goodbye, and ever since then the ground I stand on has felt less sure and solid beneath my feet.'

The author also reflects on his family, particularly on his relationship with his mother and his two grandmothers, the latter of which, he imagines a conversation with in his study. The memoir concludes with further reflections on the suicide of his father and his uncle, his memories of the birth of his brother, Jamie, their childhood together in Bermuda, their friendship as adults, and finally his passing in 1998.

== Themes ==
As with Buechner's previous three memoirs – The Sacred Journey (1982), Now and Then (1983), and Telling Secrets (1991) – The Eyes of the Heart discusses many of the themes that have come to be associated with the work of Frederick Buechner: faith, tragedy, the extraordinary nature of the ordinary, and, as Buechner scholar Dale Brown puts it, "the big idea that runs like a steady current through his career – the possibility of joy in the midst of puzzling reality." More than the previous works, however, this final autobiographical work considers the theme of death and the afterlife, as the author recalls the passing of those nearest to him. Commenting upon Buechner's memoirs, Brown writes that the autobiographical works "illustrate Buechner's theory of what he calls the 'sacred function of memory' – the obliteration of the artificial designations of past, present, and future in order to reinhabit and reunderstand the moments of our lives."
