= Whistling in the Dark (Buechner book) =

- Author: Frederick Buechner
- Language: English
- Publisher: Harper and Row
- Publication date: 1988
- Preceded by: A Room Called Remember
- Followed by: The Clown in the Belfry: Writings on Faith and Fiction

Whistling in the Dark: A Doubter's Dictionary, first issued as Whistling in the Dark: An ABC Theologized, is a collection of meditations on faith, Christianity, and theology by Frederick Buechner. It is the third and final instalment of Buechner's lexical trilogy, which includes Wishful Thinking (1973) and Peculiar Treasures (1979). Published in 1988 by Harper and Row, Whistling in the Dark is Buechner's ninth non-fiction work.

== Composition ==
In the introduction to Whistling in the Dark, Buechner places this new "dictionary" in the same family as those he previously published. Whereas in Wishful Thinking: A Theological ABC, the author sought to provide contemporary insight into "many great religious words", in this new volume, originally subtitled "an ABC theologized", Buechner takes "other", "plain words" as his subject, and offers a "theological" reading of them.

As with Wishful Thinking and Peculiar Treasures, Whistling in the Dark is partly influenced by Buechner's time as a teacher and chaplain at the Phillips Exeter Academy: a "respon[se] to [his] memories of teaching at Exeter".

== Themes ==
Buechner's introduction to Whistling in the Dark identifies the book with many of the themes that run throughout his work. Concerning the title of the volume, the author writes that "Faith is a kind of whistling in the dark [...] an attempt to keep the spirits up while peering through the shadows for some glimmer of Meaning". In its elevation of topics such as "Adolescence", "Ageing", "Sleep", "Dreams", "Money", "Goodbye", and "Jogging", Whistling in the Dark exhibits a preoccupation that, according to Dale Brown, runs "throughout his published writings and interviews": the significance of the quotidian elements of life, and the "miraculous in the ordinary". Here, as elsewhere, Buechner nods to the influence of Paul Tillich by arguing throughout the volume that "art and faith share this call to regard personal story". Jeffrey Munroe also notes the influence of the theologian on Whistling in the Dark, writing that Buechner "echoes Tillich's controversial statements about God's existence with more clarity" than the theologian himself did.
