= Telling Secrets (memoir) =

1991 memoir by Frederick Buechner

- Author: Frederick Buechner
- Language: English
- Genre: Autobiography
- Published: 1991
- Publisher: HarperSanFrancisco
- Preceded by: Now and Then (memoir)
- Followed by: The Eyes of the Heart: a memoir of the lost and found

Telling Secrets: a memoir (1991), is the third of four partial autobiographies written by Frederick Buechner. Published in 1991, the work considers in depth several scenes and events from the author's life, from his father’s suicide through to his time spent as a visiting professor at Wheaton College.

== Overview ==
Buechner introduces his third memoir by reflecting on the nature of autobiography. With reference to his first two autobiographical works, The Sacred Journey (1982) and Now and Then (1983), he asks: ‘Are the events I describe anything like the way they really happened? As I look back over them, I think I seen patterns, causal relationships, suggestions of meaning, that I was mostly unaware of at the time. Have I gotten them anything like right?’. These first two memoirs, he continues, ‘dealt mainly with the headlines of my life’. In Telling Secrets, Buechner determines to relate his ‘interior life’, which he likens to the ‘back pages’ of a newspaper: ‘like the back pages’, he writes, ‘it is in the interior where the real news is.’

Buechner begins by meditating on the effects of his father’s suicide in the November of 1936. Concerning the process of grief, the author writes that: ‘His suicide was a secret we nonetheless tried to keep as best we could, and after a while my father himself became a such a secret. There were times when he almost seemed a secret we were trying to keep from each other.’ Twenty-two years after the suicide, Buechner recounts his mother’s ‘fury’ at the ‘brief and fictionalized version’ of the event that he included in his third novel, The Return of Ansel Gibbs (1958). Remembering his mother, the author proceeds to consider his own experience of parenthood, and the traumas of raising children through difficult circumstances, including a brush with anorexia nervosa. Commenting upon the deeply personal nature of Telling Secrets, literary critic Dale Brown reveals that Buechner's original title for the memoir was 'Family Secrets: the life within'.

The memoir also includes reflections on the differing pluralistic and Evangelical cultures Buechner experienced while lecturing at Harvard Divinity School and Wheaton College, and his recollection of the process of writing his eleventh novel, Brendan (1987).

== Themes ==
Telling Secrets is replete with the themes often associated with the work of Frederick Buechner: faith and experience, suicide, and the extraordinary nature of the ordinary. Jeffrey Munroe suggests that, in Telling Secrets, Buechner's chief preoccupation is with 'flesh[ing] out his understanding of the tensions between human freedom and God's sovereignty', concluding that he 'seems to elevate human freedom over divine sovereignty'. Concerning the possibility of the influence of God upon ordinary life, Buechner writes in his introduction to Telling Secrets:

This account in full of becauses. The question is, Have I actually discovered them, or, after long practice as a novelist, have I simply made them up? Have I concocted a plot out of what is only a story? Who knows? I can say only that to me life in general, including my life in particular, feels like a plot, and I find that a source both of strength and of satisfaction.

Commenting upon Buechner's memoirs, scholar Dale Brown writes that the autobiographical works ‘illustrate Buechner’s theory of what he calls the “sacred function of memory” – the obliteration of the artificial designations of past, present, and future in order to reinhabit and reunderstand the moments of our lives.’ Regarding Telling Secrets in particular, Brown builds upon this idea, writing that it is 'a confession', 'an attempt to order apparent chaos', and 'an untangling of [...] family connections as well as a study of the price of denial'. Despite the serious nature of the 'crises' that Telling Secrets describes, the reviewer at Publishers Weekly notes that the author retains his 'quietly humorous voice'.
