= The Clown in the Belfry =

1992 anthology by Frederick Buechner

- Author: Frederick Buechner
- Language: English
- Publisher: Harper and Row
- Publication date: 1992
- Preceded by: Whistling in the Dark: a doubter's dictionary

The Clown in the Belfry is an anthology of sermons, lectures, and articles, authored by Frederick Buechner. Published in 1992 by Harper and Row, The Clown in the Belfry is Buechner's tenth non-fiction work.

== Composition ==
In his introduction, Buechner reveals the provenance of several of the essays published in The Clown in the Belfry, including: 'The Opening of Veins', first delivered at the Whiting Writer's Awards at the Pierpont Morgan Library in 1990; 'Flannery O'Connor', written and originally published as the foreword to Jill Baumgaertner's book on the author, Flannery O'Connor: a proper scaring (1988); and 'Faith and Fiction', a lecture delivered at the New York Public Library. This last essay was first given at Wheaton College in 1985, before then being published in William Zinsser's anthology, Spiritual Quests: the art and craft of religious writing (1988) prior to its inclusion in The Clown and the Belfry. Jeffrey Munro, in his work Reading Buechner (2019), notes that, since six of the pieces were originally sermons and four lectures, 'the great majority of this book was originally meant to be heard instead of read.'

== Themes ==
Buechner scholar Dale Brown highlights Buechner's preoccupation with Paul Tillich's theories on faith and literature within several of the works featured in The Clown in the Belfry. Brown argues that Tillich's contention 'that the assertion "God exists" is essentially metaphorical, a kind of poem' is at the centre of several works within the anthology, particularly 'Faith and Fiction'. The critic goes on to suggest that The Clown in the Belfry represents a return to Buechner's interest in the theme of memory, and that throughout the volume the author 'visits his memories as a way to speak of the same mysteries for which his novels have become celebrated'. Jeffrey Munro notes Buechner's return to the themes of pain and adolescence, explored elsewhere in works such as The Entrance to Porlock (1970); 'Buechner invents a new etymology that suggests adolescence means to grow toward pain', he writes: 'To be an adolescent on the way to becoming an adult is to experience pain in new and different ways.'
