= Telling the Truth =

Collection of essays by Frederick Buechner

- Author: Frederick Buechner
- Language: English
- Publisher: HarperCollins, NY
- Publication date: 1977
- Preceded by: The Faces of Jesus: a life story
- Followed by: Peculiar Treasures: a Biblical who’s who

Telling the Truth: the Gospel as tragedy, comedy, and fairy tale, is a collection of essays by Frederick Buechner on the subject of homiletics. It was first composed for and delivered at the Yale Divinity School Lyman Beecher Lecture series in 1976. Telling the Truth was subsequently published in 1977 by HarperCollins. It is Buechner's sixth non-fiction work.

== Composition ==
In his autobiographical work, Now and Then (1983), Buechner writes that the process of writing these lectures was ‘harder’ than those featured in The Alphabet of Grace – a series of lectures he composed for the William Belden Noble Lecture Series, delivered at Harvard in 1969. The author puts this difficulty down to two factors: ‘the randomness of my life that I had to listen to now’, and the fact that, unlike The Alphabet of Grace, Telling the Truth was ‘the kind of question you ask yourself or that your life asks you’, rather than simply ‘an answer to somebody else’s question’, which, he suggests, is ‘easier to handle’.

Written from his home in Vermont, Telling the Truth was published in the same year as the final instalment of the fictional Book of Bebb tetralogy, Treasure Hunt (1977). Based upon the premise that the author often ‘uses the non-fiction as a way to reflect on the earlier works of fiction’, Buechner scholar Dale Brown writes that previous Bebb novels, including Open Heart (1972) and Love Feast (1974), ‘show up’ in Telling the Truth.

== Themes ==
The anthology is structured into four chapters: ‘Telling the Truth’, ‘The Gospel as Tragedy’, ‘The Gospel as Comedy’, and ‘The Gospel as Fairy Tale’. Central to the work is the dictum, ‘Let the preacher tell the truth’. Buechner defines that truth first as tragedy, ‘that the world where God is absent is a dark and echoing emptiness’, secondly as comedy that ‘overwhelm[s]’ tragedy, that ‘it is into the depths of his absence that God makes himself present’, and finally, therefore, as fairy tale, a story ‘too good not to be true’. In Now and Then, Buechner writes that he

[T]ried to speak of how, with its message that, without God, all mankind labours and is heavy laden, the Gospel must be heard as tragedy first before it can be heard as a comedy in which all are given rest if they will only come unto him, and as a fairy tale last of all in which, as I put it, impossible things happen to impossible people.

Dale Brown, in his work The Book of Buechner (2006), suggests that, in Telling the Truth, Buechner is asking a similar question to that asked indirectly in the Bebb tetralogy, whether ‘comedy is the way to talk about religious questions’. In seeking to summarise the chief preoccupations of the work, however, Brown returns to what he calls the ‘controlling motif in all of Buechner’s work’: the ‘intermittent voice of God’, and the practice of ‘listening for the divine voice’, which he names as the ‘thematic centre’ of Telling the Truth. In agreement with this summary, the Kirkus reviewer suggested that, in Telling the Truth, Buechner encourages his reader 'to be more realistic about the dark, and to allow for the possibility of hope from unexpected quarters', while also allowing for fundamental interrogation of 'God-talk or religious language discussion'. In her study of the theme of laughter throughout the author's work, Marie-Hélène Davies concludes that Telling the Truth represents 'the best of Buechner's theological works', citing the 'extended [...] standing ovations' that it received when it was delivered in lecture form at Yale Divinity School.
