= The Final Beast =

1965 novel by Frederick Buechner

- Author: Frederick Buechner
- Publisher: New York: Atheneum
- Preceded by: The Return of Ansel Gibbs
- Followed by: The Entrance to Porlock

The Final Beast is the fourth novel by the American author and theologian, Frederick Buechner. It was first published in 1965 by Atheneum, New York.

== Plot summary ==
The untimely death of Franny Nicolet leaves behind her grieving husband, Theodore, and their two children. A minister, living in Myron, New England, Nicolet struggles on with the overwhelming tasks of raising his children and caring for his parishioners. When Clem Vail reports the distressed abscondment of his wife, Rooney, Nicolet drives off in search of her, and in hopes of ascertaining why she has fled her husband. His pursuit of her, however, opens up an opportunity for a local journalist, Will Poteat, to spread the malicious rumour that the parishioner and her pastor are engaged in a secret affair.

Nicolet's journey will take him down several avenues of self-discovery. The minister meets with his distant and disinterested father, Roy, with whom he haltingly attempts to ignite some form of familial relationship. The attempt proves to be a failure, though not a personal one, as ultimately the son will forgive the father, although the relationship remains dormant. Nicolet eventually finds Rooney, who has cloistered herself away in a retreat house in Muscadine, owned and operated by Lillian Flagg, a faith-healer and Christian mystic. Flagg's overtures to Nicolet on the topics of prayer and forgiveness prove to be a catalyst for change in the young minister's outlook, prompting a greater understanding about the inherent joy that lies beneath grief and suffering.

Running alongside the narrative of Nicolet's pursuit of Rooney is the tragic story of Irma Reinwasser. Having survived a Nazi concentration camp, Irma has found some semblance of ordinary life working as Nicolet's housekeeper. Her unguarded conversation with Poteat unwittingly opens the door for the newspaper man to spread the rumours regarding her employer's supposed affair among his parishioners – an outcome over which she has very little control and yet feels a great sense of culpability. Her life reaches its terrible conclusion in the novel as, wracked by uncontrollable guilt, she falls victim to a misfiring prank perpetrated by some boys who attend Nicolet's church. Despite their good intentions, their actions lead to a fire, by which Irma is tragically consumed.

== Characters ==
- Theodore Nicolet: Nicolet is beset by grief and confusion at the passing of his wife, haunted by the lifelong absence of his father, and dazed by the pace of his existence, which is taken up by the dual tasks of raising his children and caring for his parishioners. Beneath this distracted sadness, however, there is a joy that emerges in flashes of ordinary life, and in his sense of humor. Nicolet's confusion extends even to his motives over his pursuit of Rooney, and, although he is not guilty of engaging in an affair with her, he remains uncertain as to whether his desire to find her arises out of a godly sense of his duty as a minister, or out of a need for romantic connection.
- Rooney Vail: greatly aggrieved by her affair with Will Poteat, the vivacious Rooney Vail blindly flees her husband and her town in search of some sort of resolution. She finds it at the retreat house of Lillian Flagg, where she has a revelation regarding the meaning of forgiveness
- Will Poteat: a local journalist, Poteat bears the responsibility for much of the tragedy and much of the reconciliation in the story. It is his engagement in an affair with Rooney Vail that leads to her flight from her husband, and, paradoxically, to journeys of self-discovery and personal reconciliation for herself and for Nicolet. His fallacious suggestion in the local newspaper that both individuals are involved in some sort of sexual indiscretion, however, also indirectly leads to the tragic death of Irma Reinwasser, a Holocaust survivor.
- Lillian Flagg: borne out of Buechner's encounter with the faith-healer Agnes Sanford, Lillian Flagg is a charismatic and mysterious figure, who encourages both Rooney and Nicolet in their journeys towards forgiveness, reconciliation, and an increased relationship with God through the medium of prayer. Indeed, Sanford appears to have had a great effect upon Buechner. In his second autobiographical work, Now and Then (1983) he describes her as 'rather short and on the plump side with a breezy matter-of-factness about her', with 'the air of a college dean or a successful business-woman'. He further adds that 'she seemed completely without pretensions', and that 'after no more than a few minutes' conversation with her, I felt as sure as you can ever be in such matters that if there was such a thing as the Real Article in her line of work, then that was what she was.'
- Irma Reinwasser: unaware of Poteat's malicious motivations, Reinwasser is overcome with grief at the thought that she might have contributed to the dissemination of a false rumor concerning her employer and Rooney. Haunted by her appalling experiences in a concentration camp during the Holocaust, Irma is endowed with a dark sense of humor, and suffers a tragic end. Critic Dale Brown writes of her that ‘Irma’s story is the darkest of any of Buechner’s characters to this point in his career’.

Themes

Written in the years following Buechner's ordination to the ministry, The Final Beast explores many of the themes that became central to the author's future work. It is a meditation on grief, grace, death, faith lived out in the midst of the ordinary, and the search for identity. Critic Dale Brown suggests that Buechner simultaneously expresses ‘a belief that the world is a dark place’, while also finding ‘beyond human inadequacy […] faith, grace, and absurd joy’. He further argues that the novel is ‘a studied attempt to suggest the presence of grace in a tawdry world’, and manifests the desire of its author ‘to jar readers and listeners into a consideration of spiritual possibilities’. In Now and Then Buechner offers the following summary of its central theme, writing that 'the part of the Christian experience' that he 'tried to make real', was element he found 'conspicuously absent' in other Christian books: 'the experience of salvation as grace, as the now-and-thenness and here-and-thereness of the New Being.'

As with Buechner's first three novels, A Long Day’s Dying, The Seasons' Difference, and The Return of Ansel Gibbs, much of the novel is concerned with the thought-life of its characters. Unlike these novels, however, Buechner's preoccupations in The Final Beast are less concerned with modernist presuppositions – despite the returning themes of grief, loss, and ennui, the presence of futility is less prevalent, although, as Buechner himself writes: ‘doubt and darkness have their say along with faith and hope’.

== Context of the novel’s composition ==
In Now and Then Buechner recalls the context out of which he wrote his fourth novel. The author had been teaching theology at the Phillips Exeter Academy since September 1958, and took a sabbatical in Vermont during the 1963–64 school year. He describes 'sitting on the living-room couch trying to get on with' his next novel when he received a phone call from a friend:

The president had been shot, she said. He was in a hospital in Dallas. He was not expected to last out the day. No one who lived through that time can ever forget it, of course, or those few days that followed it when the world stood still, and everybody remembers just where they were and what they were doing when the news came through.

By the time the sabbatical drew to an end in September 1964 Buechner had finished the novel, naming it The Final Beast, a phrase taken from the final line in a poem by Stephen Crane, 'God Lay Dead in Heaven'. Elsewhere in Now and Then, Buechner describes his trepidation regarding the publication of this, his first novel since entering into the ministry, and of those who would enter into the novel expecting 'a sermon with illustrations in the form of character and dialogue'. Concerning his own writing process, the author writes that novels begin as 'a lump in the throat':

I don't start with some theological axe to grind, but with a deep, wordless feeling for some aspect of my own experience that has moved me. Then, out of the shadows, a handful of characters starts to emerge, then various possible relationships between them, then a setting maybe, and lastly, out of those relationships, the semblance at least of a plot. Like any other serious novelist, I try to be as true as I can to life as I have known it.

Critical reception

Buechner's first novel as an ordained minister, The Final Beast was received with a certain guardedness by a number of critics. As Dale Brown writes, ‘the news of the ordination was on the streets, and the weight of this outburst of dubiety has pushed against Buechner’s literary reputation since’. Writing in Christianity and Crisis, Amos Wilder suggested that the novel constituted ‘a good test case of whether a modern artist can make traditional Christian language palatable or effective to a general audience today’. Julian Moynahan, in his review published in Book Week, concluded that ‘The Final Beast lodges itself at midpoint between the priest’s and the writer’s way of looking at things’. In an article written for The Spectator, John Davenport argued that the theological centre of the novel is located largely in its common worldview; ‘Mr. Buechner is no puritan’ he insists: ‘He makes us aware that everything has to be paid for and that an awareness of truth is more desirable than a febrile search for 'happiness.'’.

Many critics noted the altered style of Buechner's fourth novel over and against his previous three. Dale Brown writes that the new Buechnerian style was ‘freer’, and characterised by ‘simplicity’ and ‘an instinct for humor’. Writing for Punch, critic Venetia Pollock argued that ‘The writing is excellent and the handling crisp’. Critics such as Katherine Jackson and Arthur Mizener concluded that Buechner had handled and paired his characters, style, and theme with skill. The latter wrote in the New York Times that the novel evoked ‘the beauty and laughter underlying the filth and boredom of this world’, to which the former, in a review published in Harper’s, added the final word that:

This is a story that skates with daring skill and exuberant speed over the thin ice of potential blasphemy, sentimentality, and violence to emerge finally on the firm, smooth surface of honest faith and uproarious laughter.
