= Peculiar Treasures =

1979 book by Frederick Buechner

- Author: Frederick Buechner
- Language: English
- Publisher: HarperCollins, NY
- Publication date: 1979
- Preceded by: Telling the Truth: the Gospel as tragedy, comedy, and fairy tale
- Followed by: A Room Called Remember

Peculiar Treasures: A Biblical Who's Who, is a collection of meditations on the stories of biblical figures, written by Frederick Buechner. It is the second of Buechner's lexical trilogy, which includes Wishful Thinking (1973) and Whistling in the Dark (1988). Published in 1979 by Harper and Row, Peculiar Treasures is Buechner's seventh non-fiction work.

== Composition ==
In his autobiographical work, Now and Then (1983), Buechner reveals that, in similarity with many of his early non-fiction publications, Peculiar Treasures was inspired by his time as a teacher and chaplain at the Phillips Exeter Academy (1958–67): 'much of what I had to do', he remembers, 'was simply to reach back to what I remembered from my Exeter years and to questions I had tried to answer then'. The resultant profiles of Biblical figures around which the book is centred, he concludes, are the result of his attempt to 'scrape off some of the veneer with which centuries of reverence had encrusted them until I reached something at least approaching, I hoped, what had once been their flesh-and-blood humanity'.

Written from his home in Vermont, Peculiar Treasures features a collection of pen and ink illustrations, drawn by the author's daughter, Katherine. Of these drawings, Buechner writes that 'in some cases [they] struck me as more telling than my words'.

== Themes ==
Buechner scholar, Marie-Hélène Davies, argues that laughter is a central theme in Peculiar Treasures, and that this is an 'extremely rare' quality in 'theological writing'. This is supported by Buechner's own admission in his 'Author's Note', that '[t]here's a fair amount of laughter elsewhere among these sketches too', and that 'it's unseemly at best and, at worst, enough to get me defrocked'. Davies, while noting this potential for controversy, suggests that 'most of the time Buechner's humour is to the point, witty, apt, and reverent'. Peculiar Treasures, she concludes, 'is the work of an unsystematic theologian who deals in brilliant aperçus, illuminating insights, and fateful and faithful encounters'.

In his literary critical work, The Book of Buechner, Dale Brown focuses in on Buechner's portrayal of Jacob as emblematic of the themes that run throughout Peculiar Treasures. He writes that the author 'emphasizes the humanness of the father of nations', drawing out his 'loves and jealousies', his 'humiliations and bewilderments', his 'soaring faith and plunging despair', and his experience of the 'weariness of 'day-to-day survival'. Brown posits this exploration of Jacob as precursory to Buechner's 1993 novel, The Son of Laughter. The critic also notes that Buechner's un-sanitised depiction of Biblical characters in Peculiar Treasures inspired songs by both Michael Card and Daniel Amos 'based on the humor and contemporary themes Buechner finds in the Genesis account'.
