= A Room Called Remember =

Book by Frederick Buechner

- Author: Frederick Buechner
- Language: English
- Publisher: HarperCollins, NY
- Publication date: 1984
- Preceded by: Peculiar Treasures
- Followed by: Whistling in the Dark: a doubter's dictionary

A Room Called Remember is a collection of sermons, meditations, articles, and addresses, authored by Frederick Buechner. Published in 1984 by Harper and Row, A Room Called Remember is Buechner's eighth non-fiction work.

== Composition ==
In the Preface to this collection, Buechner introduces it as a 'grab bag': a 'handful of sermons', essays, addresses, and articles. Concerning the sermons, the author writes that they were written for and preached at a diverse set of venues, including the Harvard Memorial Church, the Pacific School of Religion, and his local Congregational Church at Rupert, Vermont. Several of the essays, he reveals, were first published in The New York Times Book Review and The Christian Century, and, among the lectures, he lists his commencement address delivered at Union Presbyterian Seminary and a lecture given at Bangor Seminary. Concluding his prefatory remarks, Buechner writes that the volume is made up of 'fugitive pieces': 'occasional, scattered, ephemeral'.

== Themes ==
The pieces in A Room Called Remember discuss a variety of issues and themes. The anthology contains theological meditations on 'Faith', 'Hope', and 'Love', an article on the topic of Christmas (originally solicited and then turned down by The New York Times 'for being too theological'), and autobiographical pieces on both the topic of God's intervention into and via the ordinary, and the question: 'How has your mind changed in the last decade?'.

Marjorie Casebier McCoy writes that several of the essays in A Room Called Remember 'reveal more about [Buechner's] literary Mentors'. In 'The Speaking and Writing of Words', for example, Buechner meditates at length on the work of authors such as John Donne, Anthony Trollope, and Fyodor Dostoevsky. Dale Brown notes the presence of Buechner's other "mentors" in essays such as 'The Two Stories', in which, he writes, the author nods to theological principles derived from the work of Paul Tillich, who Buechner was taught by while at Union Theological Seminary, NY. The influence of Tillich is most evident, argues Brown, in 'Buechner's attempts to connect story and religion' in these essays, and in his wider works.
