= Brendan (novel) =

1987 novel by Frederick Buechner

- Author: Frederick Buechner
- Language: English
- Publisher: New York: Atheneum
- Publication date: 1987
- Preceded by: Godric
- Followed by: The Wizard's Tide

Brendan is the eleventh novel by the American author and theologian, Frederick Buechner. It was first published in 1987 by Atheneum, New York, and it won the Christianity and Literature Book Award for Belles-Lettres in the same year.

== Plot summary ==
Brendan is a reimagining of the life of Brendan the Navigator, a fifth century Irish saint, ‘born in 484 in what is now Tralee, Ireland’, whose entrance into the world, as recalled by Bishop Erc, was attended by a miracle: the spontaneous combustion of a patch of nearby woodland. Erc's decision to set aside the life of the new-born child in service of the “new faith” sees Brendan separated from his parents, Finnloag and Cara, and raised ‘to the glory of the new and true grand God’, at the school of Abbot Jarlath. Equipped with Latin and accompanied by his childhood friend, Finn, the adolescent Brendan is sent out on a mission to bring a blessing to the castle at Cashel, where a new king is to be crowned. Their journey is interrupted, however, when they are intercepted by a druidic tribe, who, unimpressed by Brendan's protective bishop's ring, insist upon bringing them to the court of their own king, Bauheen. Bauheen's health problems, particularly his inability to walk, appear to be miraculously healed by the young monk, whose Christ-like command, ‘”walk!”’, is obeyed by the king, to the astonishment of all onlookers. The conversion of both the king and his subjects seems the natural response to this extraordinary happening, and this small kingdom is brought out from the “old faith” and into the “new”.

Brendan expects to bring the simple blessing of Bishop Erc to a new monarch at Cashel, but, upon their arrival at the castle, the travellers are confronted by a clown named Crosan, who informs them of a succession crisis. The destiny of the crown, and the kingdom with it, is caught between two suitors: the first, Hugh the Black, the charismatic champion of the “old faith”; the second, the humble, unimpressive, and ironically named Hugh the Handsome, who is, controversially, a follower of the “new faith”. Into this cloud of confusion and tension steps an old friend, Maeve, who, following her childhood sojourn at Jarlath's school alongside Brendan, had been stationed at a nunnery, before escaping to become a roving warrior. Maeve's scheme to demonstrate Hugh the Black's unsuitability for the kingship – a scheme that involves her wrestling him to the ground in order to prove his rumoured infertility – is successful, and it ensures that Hugh the Handsome is installed as King of Cashel. In a further and unexpected victory for the “new faith”, Hugh the Black's most potent weapon, a cunning and eloquent bard named MacLennin, is both baptised and renamed by Brendan, who gives him the new name of Colman. His first escapade at an end, Brendan returns to Jarlath's abbey, accompanied by Finn, Crosan, and Colman. Bishop Erc's tales from the time of Saint Patrick, especially those concerning the martyrs who journeyed across the sea in search of the “land of the blessed”, stir in Brendan memories of his own childhood vision, in which, from a vantage point on cliffs overlooking the stormy waves, he himself had seen the same mysterious paradise: “Tir-na-n-Og”. Following the eventual death of Bishop Erc, Brendan is inspired to follow in the tradition of the “curragh martyrs”, to sail the high seas in search of the “land of the blessed”. Boarding the boat, he is joined by Finn, Crosan the Clown, Colman the Bard, and two monks from Jarlath's abbey, Dismas and Gestas. As the ship sets sail, however, Finn, who is unused to life on the water, falls overboard, and is apparently lost to the waves. Believing his friend to be dead, Brendan continues his journey, beset by doubt, fear, grief, and numbness, which becomes for him a dark night of the soul. Within the turmoil of this crisis, the adventurers encounter a giant whale, a hellish volcanic eruption, unhinged monks who inhabit desolate islands, and an uncouth stranger full of tales, sat astride a rock in the middle of the sea. The tragic death of Dismas brings further torment for Brendan, and a loss of faith for Gestas, who is cast into deep depression by the loss of his bosom friend.

Upon returning from this, his first voyage, Brendan is greeted by joy and tragedy. In his absence both of his parents have died, but he is astonished to find that Finn is alive. Leaving his wife, Finn follows his old friend on a new quest to build monasteries all over Ireland. Brendan's tales of his voyage on the Cara grow with each telling, and the men that are drawn to him give their lives to the “new faith”, many of them becoming monks in his newly built monasteries. Following the calamitous death of one of his disciples, Beothacht – a death for which Brendan feels personally responsible – he leaves his vocation as a founder of monasteries, and takes to the sea once more, a broken man desperately in search of Tir-na-n-Og. His quest ends in despair, and, following a misadventure on an island once inhabited by monks, the pilgrim returns home again, weary, dispirited, and convinced that his life has been a failure. Encouraged to spend his last days as a travelling preacher, Brendan journeys through the rugged countryside of Wales. The old saint is bent on using his twilight years in the service of the poor, the care of the destitute and elderly, and in offering spiritual council to all who will listen, before taking his last voyage back to Ireland, and finally, having produced several miracles, bringing peace to Cashel.

== Characters ==
- Brendan: A mercurial individual, Brendan's self confidence, and his apparent ability to conjure up extraordinary miracles, is balanced against his tendency to fall into doubt and despair, his occasional outbursts of rage, and his propensity for amplification in the telling of his own stories. He is, by his own admission, ‘Christ’s man’, ‘heaven sent’, and endowed with the ability to ‘make old things as good as new’. Concerning the historic figure of Brendan the Navigator, Dale Brown writes that the source of much of the material describing his life is found in Navigatio Sancti Brendani, a tenth-century account of the sixth-century saint's life and travels.
- Finn: A narrator in the mould of several of Buechner's earlier characters, Finn is sceptical and measured, ‘a plain fellow looking out at the world in the usual way’. Like Tono, Buechner's narrator in The Book of Bebb, Finn is both absorbed by the protagonist and yet loath to believe his more fantastical tales. Like Brendan, however, Finn will also endure tragedy, including the death of his son, and doubts over whether he was right to leave his wife in search of adventure with his childhood friend.
- Bishop Erc: large, jovial, and impressive, Bishop Erc is a member of the earliest generation of converts to the “new faith”. Brought to Christ by the ministry of Saint Patrick himself, Erc is a curious mix of earthy older traditions and language, and Christian spirituality. Seeing a sign in the breakout of fire amongst the trees near Brendan's cradle, Erc deduces that the life of the new born is to be set aside in service of Christ, and it is both his sending of the child to Abbot Jarlath, and his inspired story-telling, that brings about Brendan's mission to Ireland and the world.
- Abbot Jarlath: proprietor of an abbey, Jarlath schools Brendan in the new faith, its language, its scriptures, its principles, and its mysteries.
- Maeve: a fiery maiden, Maeve endures her schooling alongside Brendan under Abbot Jarlath, before being sent to a nunnery. Unable to submit to this way of life, however, she escapes, and dons the armour of a warrior, embarking upon several adventures that bring about the crowning of a king at Cashel, and see her become a stowaway on Brendan's final voyage in search of Tir-na-n-Og.
- Crosan: the clown at Cashel, Crosan's riddles and jokes only carry the appearance of nonsense. Hidden within them, however, are truths concerning the human heart and the state of the kingdom.
- Colman: bard of Hugh the Black, a champion of the “old faith”, MacLennin is converted by Brendan's claim that Christ as the great “bard” of creation. Baptised and renamed by Brendan, Colman the Bard becomes his constant companion, rendering the words of the “new faith” in the earthy words of the old: ‘Christ is my druid’, he sings, ‘I shall want for nothing’.

== Composition ==
Brendan was written by Buechner seven years after the publication of his tenth novel, Godric. In the intervening years Buechner had published several memoirs, including The Sacred Journey (1982) and Now and Then (1983). The author's return to fiction writing, and the world of medieval Europe, was, he recalls, partly inspired by his own spiritual experiences. In his autobiographical work, Telling Secrets, Buechner describes attending St Barnabas Church in Glen Ellyn IL, while guest lecturing at Wheaton in the Fall term of 1985. The author remembers being particularly struck by the preaching of the rector, Robert MacFarlane: ‘He spoke very quietly, and the church he spoke in was not brilliantly lit but full of shadow, full of secrets’. Searching for a similar experience upon his return to Vermont, Buechner recalls his visit to a Greek Orthodox Monastery, and a sermon delivered by a 'huge monk in cloth of gold'. Shortly after this experience, the author began writing his next novel, Brendan.

A common theme with many of his previous characters, Buechner describes a close connection that he felt between himself and ‘Brendan the Navigator’:

He was a haggard sort of man as I pictured him, in many of the ways that I also am haggard, a loose-footed sort of a red-headed, inhibited, nimble-tongued, miracle-working man. He may have sailed as far as Newfoundland in his wanderings, maybe even as far as Florida some believe, but he never found what he was after, needless to say, and at the end of his long life somewhere around the year 580 wondered if perhaps he had spent all those years on a wild goose chase when he might better have stayed home and looked for Christlier ways to serve Christ and his Kingdom there.

In his reflections on the process of writing Brendan, Buechner also reveals some details about the publication history of the novel, and of his previous fiction. Published initially by Atheneum, New York, a second edition of Brendan was subsequently released by HarperCollins. In Telling Secrets, Buechner pays tribute to Clayton Carlson, the director of the HarperCollins religious division, who republished 'virtually all' of the author's earlier books.

== Themes ==
Brendan is thematically consonant with much of Buechner's earlier fiction, with its reflections on the life of faith, the presence of the miraculous within the ordinary, death, and doubt. Literary critic Dale Brown notes that, outside of the Buechner canon, the author's depictions of both Brendan the Navigator and Godric of Finchale fall within a tradition of ‘literary saints’, including ‘the “crazy saints” of Flannery O'Connor, along with Dostoevsky’s Father Zossima, Salinger’s Seymour Glass, and Greene’s whiskey priest’. Regarding the themes within the novel, Brown suggests that its success is located in the author's imagining of 'the resounding clash between paganism and Christianity in the youthful days of the Christian faith in Ireland.' Despite its new setting, the critic writes that the novel retains 'essential Buechnerian themes such as the mixture of false and true and the possibility of God's involvement in human experience'.

As with many of its predecessors, Buechner's eleventh novel utilises a first person narrator, in the form of a childhood friend of Brendan's named Finn. Concerning the development of this particular voice, Buechner commented in an interview with Harold Fickett that:

One of the great devices in Irish writing is the simple business of reversing the usual position of adjectives. Instead of saying the little black dog ran into the room, they say the black little dog ran into the room, and it’s all the difference in the world.

== Critical reception ==
A number of critics offered comment on the prose style of Brendan. In a review published in the New York Times, Julia O'Faolain called the novel ‘strikingly convincing’, characterising its style as ‘sinewy and lyrical’. In the Los Angeles Times Book Review, Thomas Cahill struck a similar note, describing Brendan as a ‘lusty, bawdy, teeming, festooning, dancing marvel of a book’. He continues: ‘Within its crafty interlacings, we can read its buoyant meaning: that life, for all its woes, is essentially a comedy.’

Other critics further noted the ‘buoyant’ union of style and subject in Buechner's eleventh novel. The reviewer for The Atlantic identified it as a ‘a grand, gaudy tale’, while The Washington Post World review labelled Brendan an ‘exuberant’ novel, which ‘proves the power of faith to lift us up, to hold us straight, to send us on again.’ In her work, Frederick Buechner: novelist/theologian of the lost and found, literary critic Marjorie Casebier McCoy suggests that the novel ‘wells up from Buechner’s questing faith’, concluding that here the author ‘has discovered a way that makes it possible for him to carry out his vocation as novelist/theologian’. Dale Brown writes that ‘Brendan is a stew of Dante and Homer, the northern mythologies, and even a dash of Malory and Tolkien. There is much more here of the fanciful and fantastic.’
