= The Return of Ansel Gibbs =

1958 novel by Frederick Buechner

- Author: Frederick Buechner
- Language: English
- Publisher: Alfred A. Knopf
- Publication date: 1958
- Preceded by: The Seasons' Difference
- Followed by: The Final Beast

The Return of Ansel Gibbs is the third novel by the American author and theologian Frederick Buechner. It was first published in 1958 by Alfred A. Knopf, New York.

== Plot summary ==
Retired government operative and lawyer Ansel Gibbs is called out of retirement to take a post in the president's cabinet. During the intervening years, which have been spent between the quiet seclusion of his farm in Montana and living an anonymous life in Europe, Gibbs has become sceptical about the nature of Western civilisation, and has developed a feeling of uncertainty about life itself. As such, his re-entrance into public life marks the beginning of an existential crisis.

The novel begins with the announcement at a news conference of his decision to return, after which Gibbs embarks on a journey down to Washington DC for the necessary senate hearings. While on the journey, Gibbs begins to quietly wonder whether he is able to return to public life, and whether public life and service are even possible. Upon arriving in Washington he is met by his young, intelligent daughter, Anne, and his ambitious advisor, Porter Hoye. They are joined by the family's hostess, socialite Louise von Louwe, and by Robin Tripp, a charismatic young television host who is courting Anne. The arrival of Tripp precipitates a further crisis in the mind of Gibbs, who has long felt responsible for the suicide of the young man's father, an old friend named Rudy Tripp. Gibbs is haunted by the memory of the grieving widow's report that the arrival of a notice of dismissal, sent by Gibbs but delivered by an aide, was seen as a betrayal by Rudy, ‘the last, terrible straw’.

This guilt is magnified for Gibbs when he begins to suspect that Robin Tripp holds him responsible for the death of his father. Tripp is the driving force behind a particularly uncomfortable televised debate between Gibbs and Senator Edward Farwell, a strongly conservative politician who self-righteously opposes the appointment of Gibbs. Upon being questioned heatedly by Farwell over the suicide of Rudy Tripp, Gibbs responds by honestly relaying the story and his own sense of guilt on national television, bypassing both his audience and Farwell with the concluding words to their host: ‘Yours is the verdict I want, Tripp’.

The would-be cabinet member also faces inquest from his old mentor and tutor in theology, Henry Kuykendall, who, in his old age, has taken to running a mission to the poor in Harlem. The novel is, as Dale Brown writes, ‘a series of trials’: ‘Gibbs is on trial with the senate, with his daughter, with Robin Tripp, with Kuykendall, and with Farwell. Most of all, however, he is trying himself.’ In the wake of his television appearance, which is seen as a disaster by his advisors, Gibbs visits Sylvia Tripp to seek forgiveness and clarity over the death of her husband, and his own involvement in it. There he receives a sort of absolution, with the revelation that Rudy's mounting sense of self-loathing and personal failure, accumulated over many years, was the real cause for his suicide.

== Characters ==
- Ansel Gibbs: A retired lawyer, public servant, and widower, Gibbs has achieved much in his life. His sharp intelligence and vast experience render him eminently qualified to return to life in the upper echelons of power, yet his increasing self-doubt, which stretches beyond questions concerning his personal relationships to wider existential crises about faith and civilisation itself, prove a barrier to his acceptance of the role offered to him. Further to this, his suspicions that his critics may be correct about the flaws they perceive in his past life and character leads him to ask, and eventually answer, the difficult questions of identity around which the novel is centred.
- Anne Gibbs: Young, conscientious, and thoughtful, Anne assists her father's old mentor, Henry Kuykendall, in his ministry to the poor in Harlem. She often encourages her father to seek a righteous path, and is constantly in mind, and at pains to remind him, of the needs of the underprivileged.
- Robin Tripp: Young, ambitious, and charismatic, Tripp is renowned for his skill as an interviewer, often hypnotising his guests with his charm, and drawing them into personal confessions on live television. Behind his TV personality, however, is a man struggling to come to terms with the great tragedy of his life, the death of his father.
- Henry Kuykendall: Kuykendall's retirement from his position as professor of Old Testament studies at Harvard has led to a second career of devoted ministry. The wise, if a little eccentric, aged divine has given his life to service of the poor and destitute of Harlem. From his mission house on the Upper West Side, Kuykendall operates as a sort of mystic, exhorting Gibbs and those around him to fulfil their potential as prophetic forces for good in the world. The inspiration for this mesmerising character was found in Buechner's own tutor in Old Testament studies, James Muilenberg, a member of the faculty at Union Seminary in New York City.
- Porter Hoye: A wily political operative, Hoye dutifully attempts to protect Gibbs from public embarrassment and failure. These attempts, however, often involve diverting Gibbs away from reaching answers to his existential questions.
- Edward Farwell: A caricature of a conservative politician, Farwell is visibly disgusted by what he perceives to be Gibbs's urbane detachment, and elitism. A.C. Speckorsky writes that Farwell is ‘an isolationist right-wing leader, spellbinder, know-nothing.’

== Themes ==
Written at a time when Buechner was beginning to consider ordination to the ministry, The Return of Ansel Gibbs explores many of the themes that would become central to Buechner's future work. At its very centre is the question of the possibility of faith and the search for identity – a search that Gibbs undergoes in full view of his family, friends, opponents, and the nation.

As with Buechner's first two novels, A Long Day’s Dying and The Seasons' Difference, much of the novel is concerned with the thought-life of its characters. Critic Dale Brown notes its ‘autobiographical texture’, and the development of recurring Buechnerian themes such as ‘heroism in spite of handicap’, the ‘rejection of sterile inaction and apathy’, ‘ambiguity’, ‘doubt’, and ‘the courage required to assert one’s humanity in the modern world’.

== Composition ==
As with his second novel, The Seasons' Difference, much of Buechner's third novel was written in Oxford, England. In his memoir, Now and Then (1983), Buechner recalls the several months following his wedding (which was officiated by James Muilenburg), noting that the composition of the novel in characteristically dismissive fashion: 'after two months near Oxford, in England, and two more near Innsbruck, in Austria, during which my wife wrote thank-you letters for wedding presents and I wrote a long-out-of-print novel for posterity, we returned to New York [...]. For lack of a better title, I called the novel The Return of Ansel Gibbs.'

Buechner's drawing upon the theme of suicide in the novel, and particularly his use of several details from the suicide of his own father, caused tension between himself and his mother. In Telling Secrets (1991), he writes:

Don't talk, trust, feel was the law we lived by, and woe to the one who broke it. Twenty-two years later in a novel called The Return of Ansel Gibbs I told a very brief and fictionalized version of my father's death, and the most accurate word I can find to describe my mother's reaction to it is fury. For days she could hardly bring herself to speak to me, and when she did, it was with words of great bitterness.

== Critical reception ==
The Return of Ansel Gibbs was received with some critical acclaim, winning the Rosenthal Award, and being adapted for the screen for Playhouse 90 (Brown, p. 104). A review in the Times Literary Supplement declared it to be ‘an important book’, and Robert Martin Adams, writing in the Hudson Review recommended it as ‘grave’ and ‘beautiful’. In his article, published in the Chicago Sunday Tribune, Victor P. Hass labelled Buechner's third novel ‘fiction of a high order of excellence’.

Edwin Kennebeck, in a review published in Commonweal, suggested that The Return of Ansel Gibbs was the ‘firmest and clearest’ of Buechner's novels, a conclusion affirmed by John P. Marquand, who wrote, concerning Buechner's character development within the novel, that: ‘There is depth and sensitivity to his writing that gives life to the most unreal of his characters. There is an introspective understanding of the struggle of the human soul that is as unusual as it is refreshing.’ Indeed, the character of Gibbs would draw comment from several reviewers and critics, including A.C. Speckorsky, who wrote of Gibbs: 'Behind his demeanour of blandly impassive detachment there is a man in the throes of a crisis of confidence, of nerve, and of faith, a man involved in a searching attempt to grapple with the fundamental issues of men and morals, of civilization and government – and his involvement with them.'

Critic and author Norman Podhoretz suggested that we find located in Gibbs a common trope of 20th century literature, that of nihilism and the ‘loss of values’:

Gibbs suffers from a certain deficiency of feeling, a certain remoteness from the natural processes and the elemental emotions. He is almost incapable of passion (sobriety, judiciousness, detachment, moderation, tolerance being the civilized virtues), and he can no more satisfy his old teacher’s demand that he become a prophet than he can prate sentimentally like the senator about Mom’s apple pie. The novel raises the question of whether such a man can be relied upon to guide the fortunes of others.

Several reviewers made much of the novel's religious content: William Hogan suggested in the San Francisco Chronicle that it is ‘a sermon in disguise’, while D.L. Stevenson, writing in Nation, presented it as a collection of ‘theological musings’. Critic and literary theorist Ihab Hassan argued that the novel was more complex than homiletic, concluding that it is ‘rich in moral ambiguities’, while Dale Brown points out that ‘the novel is, strictly speaking, no more religious than it is political. It is a novel, not a tract – a partial exploration of the cost of being alive.’
