= Alexander Miller (theologian) =

New Zealand writer (1908–1960)

Alexander "Lex" Miller (1908 – May 15, 1960) was a New Zealand Presbyterian minister, author, and Stanford University theologian. Violence towards black activists during the Montgomery bus boycott led Miller to question commitments to nonviolence as noted by Martin Luther King Jr. himself in letter sent April 1957.

== Life ==
Miller was born in 1908 at Stevenston, Ayrshire, Scotland to parents Rev. Matthew & Mrs Leonora Miller. He was the eldest of three brothers. There he married his wife Jean C MacLaren and had a son, David.

== Education ==
Miller received is Masters from Auckland University, and later went on to Columbia University in the U.S. where he received his doctorate.

The conferral of the honorary degree of Doctor of Divinity by the Pacific School of Religion in 1958 was recognition of his contributions, both personal and theological, to theological education.

== Career ==
Lex Miller's career had three sides: The articulation of the Christian faith in the academic setting, the service of the Christian Church, both his own Presbyterian denomination and Protestant Christianity at large, and the bringing of Christianity to bear on the social, economic, and political spheres of secular life.

Of these three ends, the last is a thread running throughout his life. In a day when passions ran high over pacifism, the labor movement, and unemployment, he accumulated an impressive jail record in New Zealand from picketing and pacifist demonstrations. In New Zealand he served as a Presbyterian divine and was active in the Student Christian Movement. He also became a huge influence in making the later philosopher and logician Arthur Norman Prior a "quick and keen convert" to Miller's Barthian calvinism. Arthur Prior and Alexander Miller worked together on the Student Christian Movement magazine Open Windows.

He later went to Detroit in a liaison job between Christian students and industrial workers. It was there that he impressed Reinhold Niebuhr by his activities, and was recommended by Niebuhr as a Lecturer in Religion at Stanford University.

He was the first Professor of Religion at Stanford and in 1950 inaugurated their Department of Religion and became its Head. University). His students were brought through a wide gamut of theological subject-matter and an approach to a theology concerned with the real world.

He delivered the William Belden Noble Lectures at Harvard in 1957, which were published as his 1958 book The Man in the Mirror. He wrote two books for Niebuhr's 'Christian Faith' series. In total, he authored 8 books.

== Ministry ==
Ordained in the Presbyterian Church of New Zealand in 1937, he occupied pastorates there, in England, and in Scotland. While in London Docklands; the area was subjected to continuous bombing attacks and he saw his first Presbyterian Church charge destroyed by the bombing. He then became Assistant to the Rev George MacLeod in the Iona Community. From 1943 to 1945 he was associated with Sir George MacLeod in the Iona Community in Scotland. He served as Pastor in Napier, New Zealand from 1945 to 1948.

While at Stanford he was a member of the Presbytery of San Jose of the United Presbyterian Church in the U.S.A. He was much in demand as lecturer and preacher in churches and church groups of all denominations.

His theology, rooted in the great Reformation traditions and enlivened by the work and personal influence of Reinhold Niebuhr, sought a responsible and intelligible articulation of the Biblical heritage.

At his death, he was a member-at-large of the Central Committee of the National Student Christian Federation, a member of the Message Committee of the National Council of Churches, and a fellow of the National Council on Religion in Higher Education.

== Person ==
Stanford University's 1960 Memorial Resolution reports that Lex Miller "retained a rare humility of spirits informed by a study faith and accompanied by a nonchalance about himself," and they would "remember him as a colleague who combined wisdom with innocence, humor with piety, energetic support of academic freedom with unswerving devotion to Christian truth. His own life bore eloquent testimony to a quotation from Karl Barth, which he used as a motto for his Noble Lectures: 'Man is the creature made visible in the mirror of Jesus Christ.'

"Lex was not a pliable personality. He held tenaciously to whatever aspects of truth (that) gripped him. He ventured his whole existence on what he believed; and, because he was sometimes intellectually mistaken, ... he occasionally stumbled. But he never altered his convinced conduct just because the results hurt himself."

These reports on the quality his character were attested to by all those who knew him, including the well known Dr. Gene Scott, who was a student of his at Stanford in the mid-1950s.

== Books by Alexander Miller ==
- The Christian Significance of Karl Marx (1946)
- Christian Faith and My Job (1946)
- Biblical Politics: Studies in Christian Social Doctrine (1943)
- Christian Vocation in the Contemporary World (1947)
- The Renewal of Man: A 20th Century Essay on Justification by Faith (1955)
- The Man in the Mirror (1958)
- Faith and Learning: Christian Faith and Higher Education in Twentieth Century America (1960)
