= The Entrance to Porlock =

1970 novel by Frederick Buechner

- Author: Frederick Buechner
- Language: English
- Publisher: New York: Atheneum
- Preceded by: The Final Beast
- Followed by: The Book of Bebb

The Entrance to Porlock is the fifth novel by the American author and theologian, Frederick Buechner. It was first published in 1970 by Atheneum, New York.

== Plot summary ==
Peter Ringkoping has caused a stir within his family. Owner of a second hand bookstore, the ageing author has slowly receded from relationships with his relatives, preferring instead the company of the ghost-like figures of dead authors, who have composed the books that he sells on to his customers. A constant source of worry for his long-suffering wife, Alice, Peter's whimsical nature becomes a cause for concern to his sons also, with his announcement that he intends to bequeath ‘Shangri-La’, ‘a sizeable tract of land’ on Tinmouth Mountain, to an old friend, Hans Strasser. The warden of a community for people with intellectual and emotional disabilities, Strasser hopes to make use of the land to further care for those in his care.

Worried that their father has either lost his mind or that he might be a victim of fraud, and frustrated at the prospect of losing part of their inheritance, Peter's family protest the arrangement. Unmoved by their opposition, the elderly storekeeper decides to make the journey to Strasser's community before signing the deed papers. Frustrated by his stubbornness, Peter's sons, Nels and Tommy decide to accompany him, bringing along with them Tommy's own son, Tip. At nineteen-years-old, Tip is still struggling with the problems of adolescence, and his search for his own identity has reached a crisis point, in his inability to divulge his love for a girl, Libba Vann. Throughout the journey, Tip writes a long letter to her that he will never send, in which he pours out his fears and hopes, and his general sense of disorientation. His father, Tommy, will also go on his own journey, as he begins to shed the immaturity that he has carried with him into middle-age, grappling with, and finally accepting, the inevitability of his own death, and accepting the realisation that he has to gainfully shoulder his responsibilities.

At the very centre of the group's fraught journey, however, is the internal struggle of Nels, the eldest of Peter's sons. A successful man, Nels has risen to become the headmaster of the Putnam preparatory school for boys. Rigidly obsessed with the importance of regulations and systems, Nels struggles to decide the fate of one of the boys, who has been caught taking advantage of some prescription drugs. Facing pressure from several members of staff, all of whom advise leniency, the situation is made even more complex by the news that the boy has committed suicide. Like Tommy, Nels is engaged in a struggle with the reality of his own mortality, and the tragedy of the death of one of his students brings him out of his neurotic obsession over the health of his heart and into deeper reflections.

The group's physical journey ends upon their arrival at Strasser's community. As the ageing Austrian takes them on a tour around the village he keeps watch over, he imparts a great deal of wisdom to each of the characters, inquiring after their lives and struggles, and speaking of the simple innocence of many of those that live in the community. Their internal pilgrimages, though greatly advanced by their journey together, are only just beginning, as is the restoration of their respective relationships with one another.

== Characters ==
- Peter Ringkoping: the elderly owner of a second hand bookstore, located on a sleepy mountainside in Vermont. In Now and Then Buechner writes that Peter ‘sees the ghosts of dead writers whose books he sells, sees glimpses of a shimmering reality within reality, and in the process, loses touch with his family’ (p. 81). Critic Dale Brown writes that Peter ‘searches for meaning behind the appearances of things’, and is ‘a believer in the possibility of mystical visions’.
- Nels Ringkoping: the eldest of Peter's children, Nels is a bachelor, and the headmaster of a boys’ preparatory school. His stubbornness and rigidity are compounded by his ever-present fear of having a heart attack, and his subsequent obsession over his own health. Buechner characterises Nels as the ‘cowardly lion’ of The Wizard of Oz.
- Tommy Ringkoping: the clownish younger brother, Tommy battles with the sense of his own lost potential, and, in similarity with Nels, with the fearful realisation of his own mortality. These preoccupations lead Tommy to live a shallow life, heavily punctuated by practical jokes and puns, which he plays on those around him, including his wife and son. Buechner describes him as the ‘Scarecrow who lacks a brain’.
- Tip Ringkoping: the nineteen-year-old son of Tommy, Tip is characterised by Buechner as ‘the child who wants to go home but does not know where home is’. Struggling in the throes of late adolescence, Tip is beset by worries and lost in the search for his own identity. Unable to reach out to the girl he loves, and unable to understand his own motivations and place in the world, Tip observes the adults around him for a clue as to how one might move through existence; Dale Brown writes: ‘Tip is straining to figure out what the older folks are thinking, trying to see into himself, bewildered and aware mostly of absence and misunderstanding for more of the novel’.
- Hans Strasser: Strasser is the aging warden of a community populated by people with intellectual and emotional disabilities. His wisdom, a unique perspective upon life brought about through his service to those that live in his village, becomes a source of direction and clarification for the other characters, who are all grappling with the meaning of their own existences. He is, in the words of Buechner, ‘the Wizard’, and ‘it is in their relationship to him’ that all of the characters ‘move at least a step closer to what is missing in themselves’.

== Themes ==
Buechner reflects on the themes that run through The Entrance to Porlock in his autobiographical work, Now and Then (1983). Concerning the title he chose for the novel, he writes that it is a 'reference to the visitor from Porlock who woke Coleridge out of the visionary trance of Kubla Khan.' He goes on to suggest that the central theme of the novel is 'the tension between everyday reality and the reality of dreams, of imagination'.

Buechner further reveals that the plot is ‘loosely based on The Wizard of Oz, with ‘an old man…in search of a heart’ who ‘loses touch with his family’:

One son, a pathetic failure and compulsive joker, is the Scarecrow in search of a brain. Another son, the bullying and hypochondriacal dean of a school like Exeter who fantasizes continually about receiving the farewell visits of friends as he lies dying in a hospital, is the Cowardly Lion in search of courage. And there is a grandson – confused, introverted, adolescent – who, like Dorothy, is in search of home, if only a home inside himself. The Wizard is an Austrian who runs a community for the mentally and emotionally disturbed, and it is in their relationship to him that they all move at least a step closer to finding what is missing in themselves.

With its explorations into the inner lives of each of its characters, the novel is emblematic of the dream-like quality that would become one of the hallmarks of the Buechnerian style. Subtly psychological, The Entrance to Porlock is concerned with writing itself, and with the creation of character, as much as the characters’ own discoveries of the truth about themselves. Suicide also returns as a theme central to the novel, as do developing theological preoccupations. In addition to the ‘search for identity’ Dale Brown writes that ‘Buechner weaves into The Entrance to Porlock themes related to his growing theological vocabulary – loss of innocence, the attainment of full humanity, and the presence of grace’. Additionally, he notes that the novel is a continuation of ‘the big idea that runs like a steady current through his career – the possibility of joy in the midst of puzzling reality.’

== Composition ==
The Entrance to Porlock was the first novel composed by Buechner while in full residence at his family home in Vermont. Having left his teaching post at Exeter, the author began his fifth novel in the midst of several difficulties. In Now and Then, he writes that the process of writing was paralysing: 'I was not just a man writing a book, but a man watching a man writing a book and at the same time continually asking himself whether it was a book worth writing.' The writing process was also affected by broader national events: 'To make matters still worse,' he continues, 'that was the year when both Martin Luther King and Robert Kennedy were murdered, and I remember wondering if there was anything the world needed much less to have added to its pain than another book.'

It was during the process of writing The Entrance to Porlock that Buechner was invited by Charles P. Price to give the William Belden Noble Lectures at Harvard. In Now and Then Buechner writes,

If Harvard had invited me to come pick up gum wrappers with a pointed stick, I suppose I would have been flattered, and though I'd never heard of the Noble Lectures, the men who had given them in earlier years were a group to conjure with – Teddy Roosevelt, for some reason that was never made clear to me, had been the first, but from then on they had been people like H. Richard Niebuhr and George Buttrick, and even Paul Tillich had accepted the assignment but died before the time came round. Since I was hardly a theologian myself, let alone in anything remotely resembling the league of the others as I wrote Price, what could I possibly lecture about if I decided to risk lecturing at all? Perhaps something in the area of “religion and letters," he wrote back, and it was the word letters that did it.

Buechner delivered the Noble Lectures in the Memorial Church of Harvard University during the winter of 1969. These lectures were published in the same year as The Entrance to Porlock with the title The Alphabet of Grace (1970).

== Critical reception ==
Buechner's fifth novel was generally well received by critics and literary academics. Writing in the Christian Science Monitor, Diana Loercher roundly praised The Entrance to Porlock:

There appears every now and again a lyrical, dreamlike novel that is more poem than prose, more parable than story. Such novels incapacitate conventional critical faculties; we do not understand and evaluate them rationally but rather are immersed, lulled, and transported, as in listening to music, into a shadowy world where feelings are evoked and nothing is explained. The Entrance to Porlock is that kind of novel. One is not sure after reading it whether one has read or imagined it. The contradictory sense of time contributes to this blurred impression. The entire novel takes place within 24 hours, but the movement in the characters' minds back and forth in time and the spiritual distance they travel makes the actual time span seem immeasurable.

In her 1988 study, Frederick Buechner: novelist of the lost and found, Marjorie Casebier McCoy claims that the novel ‘display[s] the virtuoso talent’ of Buechner's earlier work. McCoy is especially appreciative of the intertextuality of The Entrance to Porlock, noting that its ‘artful retelling of The Wizard of Oz’ is ‘related with compelling warmth and engaging fantasy’. Though quick to assert that the novel is ‘not a copy of The Wizard of Oz’, but rather ‘a powerful story in its own right’, the critic admires the author's use of its themes: ‘in Buechner’s hands’, she writes, ‘The Wizard of Oz becomes a metaphor for the whole of human life’. Amos N. Wilder, the Hollis Professor of Divinity at Harvard Divinity School, was similarly laudatory, writing that in the novel ‘Buechner again shows his unique talent for making wonders real and the real wonderful.’

In his review of The Entrance to Porlock, published in Southwest Review, Rudolph Nelson notices that the novel ‘included no mention whatever of explicitly religious ideas or experiences’. Despite this, he concludes that ‘the concerns are still no less ultimate, however nonreligious the language’. Critic Dale Brown concurs with this view, suggesting that it ‘is another way of exploring the possibilities of grace, the truth of fairy tale’. Brown continues: ‘with his fifth novel, Buechner nonetheless reiterates his belief that reality, though puzzling and difficult, is fraught with meaning’. Concerning the novel's theological content, critic James Woelfel writes in Theology Today: 'In Porlock as in the earlier novels, Buechner paints on a small canvas, exploring the personal hungerings for meaning and love and the complex and fragile relationships among a small group of people bound together by ties of family and friendship.’
