= Speak What We Feel (Not What We Ought to Say) =

Collection of essays by Frederick Buechner

Speak What We Feel (Not What We Ought to Say): Reflections on Literature and Faith
- Author: Frederick Buechner
- Language: English
- Publisher: HarperCollins
- Publication date: 2001
- Preceded by: The Longing for Home

Speak What We Feel (Not What We Ought to Say): Reflections on Literature and Faith is a collection of literary critical and theological essays authored by Frederick Buechner. Published in 2001 by HarperCollins, Speak What We Feel (Not What We Ought to Say) is Buechner's thirteenth non-fiction work.

== Content ==
Speak What We Feel (Not What We Ought to Say) is a collection of essays on the topic of literature and theology. The author devotes each of the individual four chapters to an author, poet, or playwright: Gerard Manley Hopkins, Mark Twain, G. K. Chesterton, and William Shakespeare. Within each chapter, Buechner re-narrates the life of the writer, before discussing in detail one or more of their works. The essays include Buechner's reflections on King Lear (1608), The Man Who Was Thursday (1908), and Adventures Huckleberry Finn (1884).

Speak What We Feel (Not What We Ought to Say) is dedicated to the author's grandson, and to his 'old friend', Malcolm Goldstein. Buechner scholar, Jeffrey Munroe, notes that the title for the work is taken from the closing lines of King Lear.

== Themes ==
In his introduction to Speak What We Feel (Not What We Ought to Say), Buechner writes that he has 'undertaken [...] to say something first about the sad times for each of them' — accepting that little is known about Shakespeare's biography — and 'then to consider how those sad times and the way each came eventually to terms with them are reflected in the masterpieces they seem to me to have engendered'. The author also states that the essays are written with the presupposition that 'all of our stories are at their deepest level the same story', and that by 'listening to these four say so powerfully not what they ought to say, but what they truly felt, we may possibly learn something about how to bear the weight of our own sadness.'

In his review of Speak What We Feel (Not What We Ought to Say), Bruce Wood argues that the authors and works considered in the volume are 'allusive presences' throughout Buechner's broader work. This is echoed by Jeffrey Munro, who further suggests that Buechner writes out of a particular affinity with the writers included in Speak What We Feel (Not What We Ought to Say), commenting that many of the author's 'greatest works' were 'formed from the crucible of his pain'. For Munroe, this affinity is made explicit by the author in his 'Afterword', which, the critic writes, is characterised by a 'pathos' that is thematic throughout Buechner's work.

Buechner scholar, Dale Brown, writes that Speak What We Feel (Not What We Ought to Say) demonstrates Buechner's consistent 'affirmation of joy and laughter as in balance with the catharsis of suffering'. The critic agrees with Munroe's suggestion that the work is autobiographical in nature, writing that it is 'a consideration of the weight of [Buechner's] own sad times, through an encounter with those of Twain, Hopkins, Chesterton, and Shakespeare'. Brown concludes that while Speak What We Feel (Not What We Ought to Say) 'reveals a good bit about four literary greats, it reveals even more about Buechner himself', and that the 'small volume is a litany in praise of kindred spirits'.
