= Kathleen Norris (poet) =

American poet (born 1947)

- Born: July 27, 1947 (age 79); Washington, D.C., U.S.
- Education: Bennington College
- Occupations: Poet, essayist
- Spouse: David Dwyer (died 2003)

Kathleen Norris (born July 27, 1947) is an American poet and essayist.

== Biography ==
Kathleen Norris was born in Washington, D.C., on July 27, 1947. Her father John was a musician and her mother Lois was a teacher. As a child, Norris moved to Hawaii with her parents, and in 1965 graduated from Punahou Preparatory School. Growing up, she spent most summers in her grandparents' town, Lemmon, South Dakota. Norris's youngest sister, Rebecca, was born with perinatal hypoxia.

After graduating from Bennington College in Vermont in 1969, Norris became arts administrator of the Academy of American Poets. She published her first book of poetry two years later. In 1974 she inherited her grandparents' farm in Lemmon, South Dakota, and moved there with her husband, poet David Dwyer.

In Lemmon, she joined Spencer Memorial Presbyterian church, and discovered the spirituality of the Great Plains. In 1986, Norris started writing non-fiction after becoming a Benedictine oblate at Assumption Abbey in Richardton, North Dakota, and spending extended periods at Saint John's Abbey in Collegeville, Minnesota. At this period in her career, one of her focuses was death and depression. In 1998, Norris gave the Madeleva lecture at Saint Mary's College (Indiana), a lecture which became the basis for The Quotidian Mysteries: Laundry, Liturgy and "Women’s Work". Also that year, she received an honorary doctorate degree from Concordia College in Moorhead, Minnesota, for her interwoven writings on the Dakotas and her faith.

After the death of her husband in 2003, Norris moved back to Hawaii. As of 2021, she attends an Episcopal church in Hawaii.

== Published books ==
=== Non-Fiction ===
- Dakota: A Spiritual Geography. Houghton Mifflin Company, Boston/New York City 1993, ISBN 0-395-71091-X (pbk.) (awarded "Notable Book" status by The New York Times)
- The Cloister Walk (Riverhead Books, 1996) ISBN 9781573225847
- Amazing Grace: A Vocabulary of Faith (1998) ISBN 9781573227216
- The Quotidian Mysteries: Laundry, Liturgy and "Women's Work" (1998) ISBN 9780809138012
- The Virgin of Bennington (Penguin, 2001) ISBN 9781573229135
- The Holy Twins: Benedict and Scholastica (Putnam, 2001) ISBN 9780399234248
- Acedia and Me: A Marriage, Monks, And A Writer's Life (Riverhead Books, 2008) ISBN 9781594489969
- Rebecca Sue: A Sister's Reflections on Disability, Faith, and Love. InterVarsity Press, Downers Grove, IL, ISBN 9781514011409. (2025)

=== Poetry ===
- Falling Off (1971)
- The Middle of the World (1981)
- The Year of Common Things (1988)
- Little Girls in Church (1995)
- Journey: New and Selected Poems, 1969–1999. University of Pittsburgh Press, Pittsburgh, Pennsylvania 2001, ISBN 0-8229-4137-6.

Norris has also been a regular contributor to such magazines as Christian Century.
