= The Alphabet of Grace =

Religion book by Frederick Buechner

- Author: Frederick Buechner
- Language: English
- Genre: Anthology
- Publisher: Seabury Press, NY
- Publication date: 1970
- Preceded by: The Hungering Dark
- Followed by: Wishful Thinking: a theological ABC

The Alphabet of Grace is a collection of addresses on Christianity and faith by Frederick Buechner. It was first conceived as a trilogy of sermons, delivered at the Harvard Memorial Church in the winter of 1969. It was subsequently published by Seabury Press, NY, in 1970.

== Composition ==
In his second autobiographical work, Now and Then, Buechner recounts his receipt of an invitation to deliver the 1969 William Belden Noble Lectures at Harvard Memorial Church by the chaplain, Charles Price. The author writes that it was Price’s prompt, that he should speak on 'religion and letters', that became the catalyst for the series: 'I found myself thinking of letters literally instead', he writes, 'of letters as the alphabet itself, the A's, B's, C's, and D's out of which all literature, all words, are ultimately composed'. He continues:

[F]rom there I wandered somehow from the notion of the events of our lives – even, and perhaps especially, the most everyday events – as the alphabet through which God, of his grace, spells out his words, his meaning, to us.

The Alphabet of Grace was Buechner's seventh published work, and was released to the public shortly after his fifth novel, The Entrance to Porlock (1970).

== Chapter list and description ==
- Preface, by Frederick Buechner

1. Gutturals (6:45-7:30 a.m.)

2. Sibilants (7:30-8:30 a.m.)

3. Absence of Vowels (8:30 a.m. – 11 p.m.)

- Author’s Notes

In Now and Then, Buechner writes that the addresses centre around 'a single representative day of my life', and that they consider ‘what there [is] of God to hear in it’. Throughout the sermons the preacher draws from a broad list of literary and theological influences, including Leo Tolstoy, Mark Twain, G.K. Chesterton, Heinrich Zimmer, and John Milton. Buechner also discusses the writing process, referring often to the novel he was finishing as he composed the sermon series, The Entrance to Porlock.

== Major themes ==
Buechner scholar Dale Brown writes that The Alphabet of Grace represents a 'turning point in Buechner’s career', and that it is 'impossible to classify'. Brown ventures that the anthology is the author’s 'first run at memoir', a 'loosening of the tongue, a first draft of the life he will tell in many volumes beginning in the 1980s'. Literary critic Jeffrey Munroe concurs with this, writing that 'The Alphabet of Grace marks a new phase for Buechner's readers'. Munroe notes that the work represents 'Buechner's first use of himself as his subject', and that, 'in many ways, from this point on, his career will be defined by using his interior life as his theme.' Munroe also suggests that the work is an early demonstration of Buechner's synthesis of his own thought with that of Paul Tillich, and that, more generally, 'the process of writing The Alphabet of Grace helps [Buechner] articulate what becomes his core philosophy'.

That 'core philosophy' is the central theme of the work, which is concerned with the interaction of the extraordinary with the ordinary, and the presence of God in the mundane. Reflecting on The Alphabet of Grace in Now and Then, Buechner offers the following famous summary of the message at the heart of the work:

[I]f I were called upon to state in a few words the essence of everything I was trying to say both as a novelist and as a preacher, it would be something like this: Listen to your life. See it for the fathomless mystery that it is. In the boredom and pain of it no less than in the excitements and the gladness: touch, taste, smell your way to the holy and hidden heart of it because in the last analysis all moments are key moments, and life itself is grace.
