= William Belden Noble Lectures =

Lecture series at Harvard University

William Belden Noble Lectures is an American series of annual presentations by accomplished individuals, held at Harvard University.

The Lectures were established in 1898 through a bequest by Nannie Yulee Noble in memory of her husband, a divinity student who died while preparing for the ministry. Speakers deliver a systematized collection of lectures on a theme of Christian thought.

According to the terms of the bequest: “The object of the Founder of the Lectures is to continue the mission of her husband, whose supreme desire was to extend the influence of Jesus as ‘the Way, the Truth, and the Life,’ and to illustrate and enforce the words of Jesus — ‘I am come that they might have life and that they might have it more abundantly.’ The Founder has in view the presentation of the personality of Jesus as given in the New Testament, or unfolded in the history of the Christian Church, or illustrated in the inward experience of His followers, or as the inspiration to Christian Missions for the conversion of the world. The scope of the Lectures is believed to be as wide as the highest interests of humanity.”

== Lecturers ==
- 1898 - Francis G. Peabody
- 1899 – George Herbert Palmer
- 1900 – William Henry Fremantle
- 1904 – William Boyd Carpenter
- 1907 – Charles Henry Brent
- 1909 – Henry Churchill King
- 1910 – Theodore Roosevelt
- 1911 – Wilfred Thomason Grenfell
- 1911 – John Neville Figgis
- 1924 – Arthur Cayley Headlam
- 1925 – Henry Major
- 1957 – Alexander "Lex" Miller
- 1968 – Harvey Cox
- 1969 – Frederick Buechner (lectures published under title, The Alphabet of Grace, in 1970)
- Eugene McCarthy
- 1981 – Dr Edward D.A. Hulmes, (see www.edwardhulmes.co.uk)
- 1982 – Robert N. Bellah
- Archbishop Robert Runcie of Canterbury
- Hans Küng
- 1995 – J. Barrie Shepherd
- Paul Tillich (schedule for 1995, but died before the date)
- 1998 – Armand Nicholi
- 2000 – John Shelby Spong
- 2003 – Francis S. Collins
- 2004 – Dr. Tim Johnson
- 2005 – Owen Gingerich
- 2006 – N. T. Wright
- 2008 – Stephen Prothero
- 2013 – Janet McKenzie
- 2014 – Joshua DuBois
- 2015 - Stanley Nelson
- 2016 – Marilynne Robinson
- 2019 - Rev. Raphael Warnock
- 2022 - John Green
- 2022 - Dr. Norman Wirzba
