= The Sacred Journey =

Partial autobiography of Frederick Buechner

- Author: Frederick Buechner
- Language: English
- Genre: Autobiography
- Published: 1982
- Publisher: Harper and Row
- Followed by: Now and Then

The Sacred Journey: A Memoir of Early Days is an autobiography by author Frederick Buechner, the first of a four part series. Published in 1982, the work describes the author's life from his childhood up until his conversion to Christianity in 1953, at the age of twenty-seven.

== Overview ==
Buechner introduces the book with the dual observations that ‘all theology, all fiction, is at its heart autobiography’, and that ‘if God speaks to us at all in this world, if God speaks anywhere, it is into our personal lives that he speaks.’ He suggests that the task of the theologian, therefore, is to examine their own lives honestly, and to then express ‘in logical, abstract terms the truths about human life and about God that he has found implicit there.’

The Sacred Journey begins with an impressionistic account of the author's childhood, culminating in the day of his father's suicide, and the bereaved family's relocation to Bermuda. Buechner then recalls the return of his family to the United States following the outbreak of the Second World War, and his attendance at Lawrenceville School in New Jersey, and subsequently Princeton. In the following chapters, Buechner recounts the beginning of his journey as an author, and the composition of his first published work, A Long Day's Dying (1950).

The final chapter charts the author's conversion experience, while attending the Madison Avenue Presbyterian Church, describing the effects of one particularly transformative sermon, delivered by George A. Buttrick:

Jesus Christ refused the crown that Satan offered him in the wilderness, Buttrick said, but he is king nonetheless because again and again he is crowned in the heart of the people who believe in him. And that inward coronation takes place, Buttrick said, "among confession, and tears, and great laughter." It was the phrase great laughter that did it, did whatever it was that I believe must have been hiddenly in the doing all the years of my journey up till then. It was not so much that a door opened as that I suddenly found that a door had been open all along which I had only just then stumbled upon.

== Themes ==
Buechner's opening observations concerning the significance of autobiography for both the theologian and the author represent a general theme common to all of his works. Buechner scholar Dale Brown notes that, in these introductory remarks, the author is offering a ‘theory of human knowledge, how we know and what we know and what the knowledge will do for us.’ Referencing Buechner's time studying under Paul Tillich at Union Theological Seminary, Brown suggests that the author is developing the theologian's ‘teaching about personal story and God story’, and that he ‘folds the notion into his very apologetic for the instinct to memoir.’ Brown concludes by commenting that: ‘Tillich argued that God may be found in the stories of our lives as in the stories of Scripture, and his young charge, Buechner, takes him at his word.’

== Reception ==
Reynolds Price, in a review for the New York Times, called the book a "beautifully successful experiment." The Christian Century praised it, saying it "reveals the ultimate goodness of all things... a book filled with wonders." The Washington Post Book World called it a "singularly graceful synthesis of memoir and theological explanation" and "entrancing."
