= Now and Then (memoir) =

1983 book by Frederick Buechner

- Author: Frederick Buechner
- Language: English
- Genre: Autobiography
- Published: 1983
- Publisher: HarperSanFrancisco
- Preceded by: The Sacred Journey
- Followed by: Telling Secrets

Now and Then: a memoir of vocation (1983), is the second of four partial autobiographies written by Frederick Buechner. Published in 1983, the work describes the author's life from his conversion to Christianity in 1953, at the age of twenty-seven, up to his residency in Vermont at the age of fifty-seven.

== Overview ==
Buechner introduces his second autobiographical work by narrating the years leading up to his attendance at Union Theological Seminary, New York. The author recalls the process of writing his first two novels, A Long Day's Dying and The Seasons' Difference, and a brief spell in Europe, during which he met Lewis Douglas, Douglas Fairbanks Jr., Bernard Berenson, and Alice B. Toklas.

Upon returning to New York, Buechner recounts his time at Union, and his encounters with Reinhold Niebuhr, Paul Tillich, Martin Buber, James Muilenburg, Samuel Terrien, Wilhelm Pauck, Cyril Richardson, and Robert McAfee Brown. Buechner particularly remembers the teaching style of Muilenberg: "Up and down the whole length of the aisle he would stride as he chanted the war songs, the taunt songs, the dirges of ancient Israel. With his body stiff, his knees bent, his arms scarecrowed far to either side, he never merely taught the Old Testament but was the Old Testament." When Buechner met Judith, the woman who was to be his wife, it was Muilenberg who officiated their wedding: "[his] hands trembled so as he read the service".

Alongside his studies, Buechner also recalls the time he spent serving at a church-run "employment clinic" in East Harlem, and the stories of those whom he met while working there – an experience that the author memorialised in his third novel, The Return of Ansel Gibbs.

Now and Then further recounts Buechner's experiences as a chaplain and Theology teacher at the Phillips Exeter Academy, and the completion of his fourth novel, The Final Beast. Here Buechner expounds upon the place that his new-found faith had come to hold in his work as a novelist: "I am a Christian novelist in the same sense that somebody from Boston or Chicago is an American novelist. I must be true to my experience as a Christian as black writers to their experience as blacks or women writers to their experience as women. It is no more complicated, no more sinister than that."

Following nine years spent at Exeter, the author then describes the relocation of his family to Vermont, where he completed his fifth novel, The Entrance to Porlock (1970). In this third and final chapter, Buechner also remembers being invited to deliver the Noble Lectures at Harvard (out of which he would publish The Alphabet of Grace), and his conception of the character of Leo Bebb, who became the central focus of his next four books, a tetralogy titled The Book of Bebb: Lion Country (1971), Open Heart (1972), Love Feast (1974), and Treasure Hunt (1977). Finally, the author recalls his discovery of hagiography, and with it his encounter with St Godric of Finchdale, which would eventually become his tenth novel, Godric.

== Themes ==
In Now and Then, Buechner develops the key theme that had been central to his first autobiographical work, The Sacred Journey: the concept of listening. In the final chapter he writes: "Listen to your life. All moments are key moments." At the heart of this concept is the notion that "if God speaks to us at all other than through such official channels as the Bible and the church, then I think that he speaks to us largely through what happens to us". "What I have done both in this book and its predecessor", he continues, "is to listen back over what has happened to me [...] for the sound, above all else, of his voice." With this theme in mind, the title for this second memoir, Now and Then, is drawn from a quote by Paul Tillich: "We want only to show you something we have seen and tell you something we have heard [...] that here and there in the world and now and then in ourselves is a New Creation." Commenting upon Buechner's memoirs, scholar Dale Brown writes that the autobiographical works "illustrate Buechner's theory of what he calls the 'sacred function of memory' – the obliteration of the artificial designations of past, present, and future in order to reinhabit and reunderstand the moments of our lives."
