= Frederick Buechner =

American religious writer (1926–2022)

The Reverend Frederick Buechner
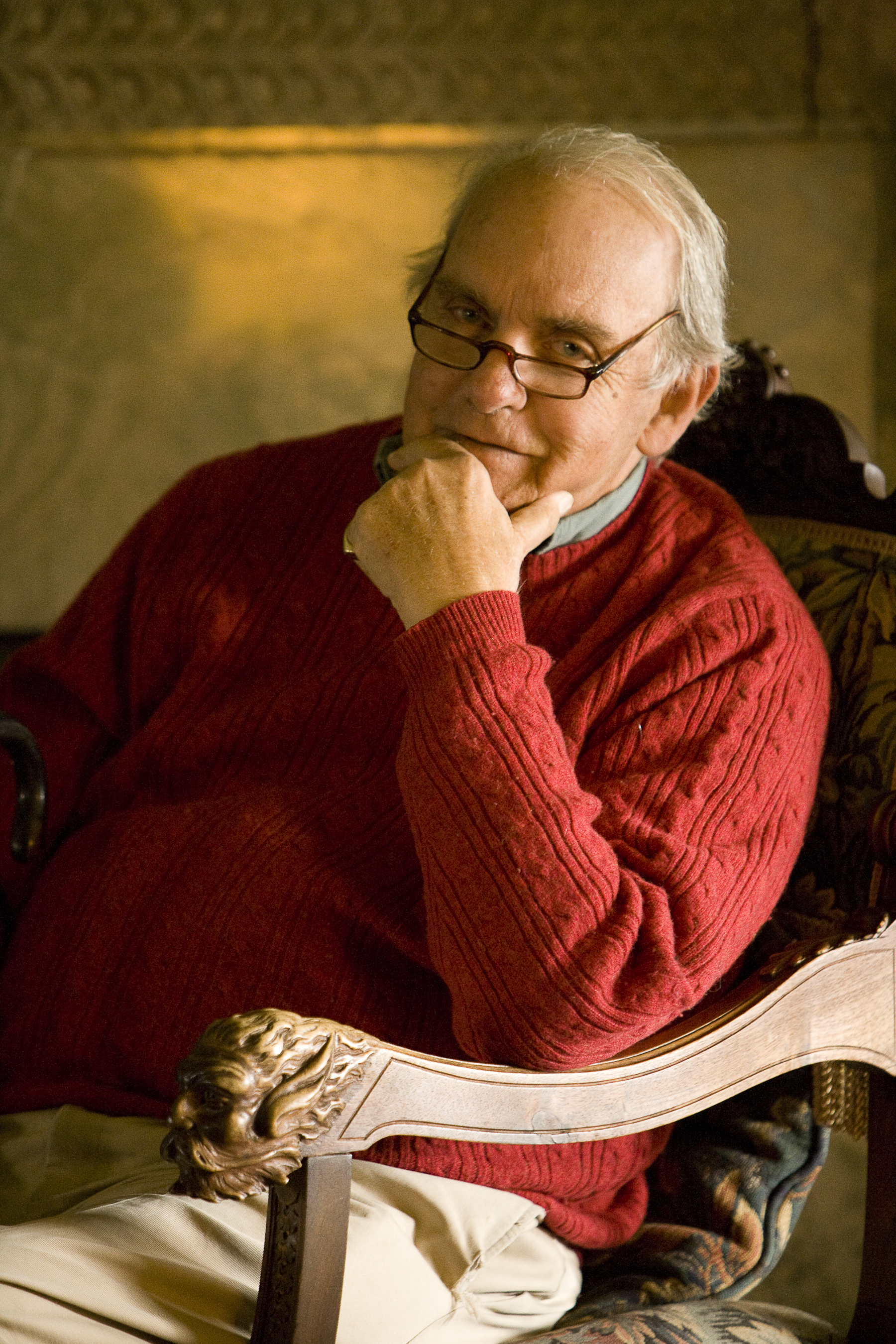
- Buechner in 2008
- Born: Carl Frederick Buechner; July 11, 1926; New York City, U.S.
- Died: August 15, 2022 (aged 96); Rupert, Vermont, U.S.
- Education: Princeton University (BA); Union Theological Seminary (BDiv)
- Occupations: Author, Presbyterian minister
- Spouse: Judith Buechner (m. 1956)
- Writing career
- Genres: Novel, short story, essay, sermon, autobiography, historical fiction
- Notable works: A Long Day's Dying; Secrets in the Dark; Godric; The Book of Bebb; The Sacred Journey; The Magnificent Defeat
- Notable awards: O. Henry Award; Rosenthal Award; Christianity and Literature Belles Lettres Prize

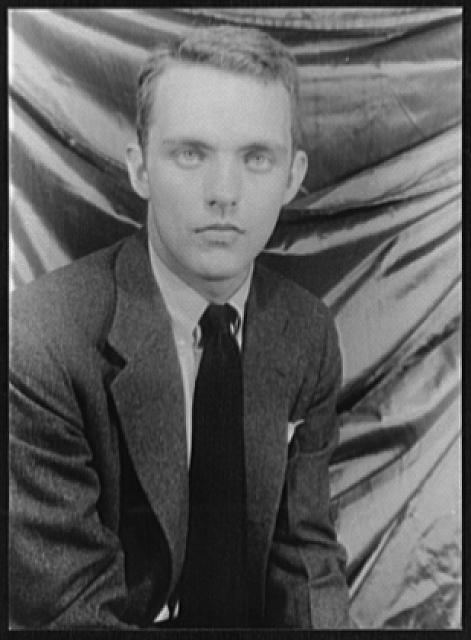
Frederick Buechner as photographed in 1950 by Carl Van Vechten

Carl Frederick Buechner (/ˈbiːknər/ BEEK-nər; July 11, 1926 – August 15, 2022) was an American author, Presbyterian minister, preacher, and theologian. The author of thirty-nine published books, his career spanned more than six decades and encompassed many different genres. He wrote novels, including Godric (1981 Pulitzer Prize finalist), A Long Day's Dying and The Book of Bebb, his memoirs, including The Sacred Journey, and theological works, such as Secrets in the Dark, The Magnificent Defeat, and Telling the Truth.

Buechner was named "without question one of the truly great writers of the 20th century" by viaLibri, a "major talent" by The New York Times, and "one of our most original storytellers" by USA Today. Annie Dillard (Pulitzer Prize-winning author of Pilgrim at Tinker Creek) called him "one of our finest writers." Buechner's works have been compared to C.S. Lewis and G.K. Chesterton and have been translated into twenty-seven languages.

Buechner was a finalist for the National Book Award, presented by the National Book Foundation, and has been awarded eight honorary degrees from such institutions as Yale University and the Virginia Theological Seminary. In addition, Buechner placed third for the O. Henry Award, the Rosenthal Award, the Christianity and Literature Belles Lettres Prize, and was recognized by the American Academy and Institute of Arts and Letters.

== Life and career ==
=== Early life ===
Carl Frederick Buechner, the eldest son of Katherine Golay (Kuhn) and Carl Frederick Buechner Sr., was born on July 11, 1926, in New York City. During Buechner's early childhood the family moved frequently, as Buechner's father searched for work. In The Sacred Journey, Buechner recalls that "Virtually every year of my life until I was fourteen, I lived in a different place, had different people to take care of me, went to a different school. The only house that remained constant was the one where my maternal grandparents lived in a suburb of Pittsburgh called East Liberty ... Apart from that one house on Woodland Road, home was not a place to me when I was a child. It was people." In 1936, Buechner's father committed suicide by carbon monoxide poisoning, a result of his conviction that he had been a failure.

=== Bermuda ===
Immediately following his father's death, the family moved to Bermuda, where they remained until World War II forced the evacuation of Americans from the island. In Bermuda, Buechner experienced "the blessed relief of coming out of the dark and unmentionable sadness of my father's life and death into fragrance and greenness and light". For a young Buechner, Bermuda became home.

Bermuda left a lasting impression on Buechner. The distinctly British flavor of pre-World War II Bermuda provided in him a lifelong appreciation of English custom and culture, which would later inspire such works as Godric and Brendan. Buechner also frequently mentions Bermuda in his memoirs, including Telling Secrets and The Sacred Journey.

=== Education and military service ===
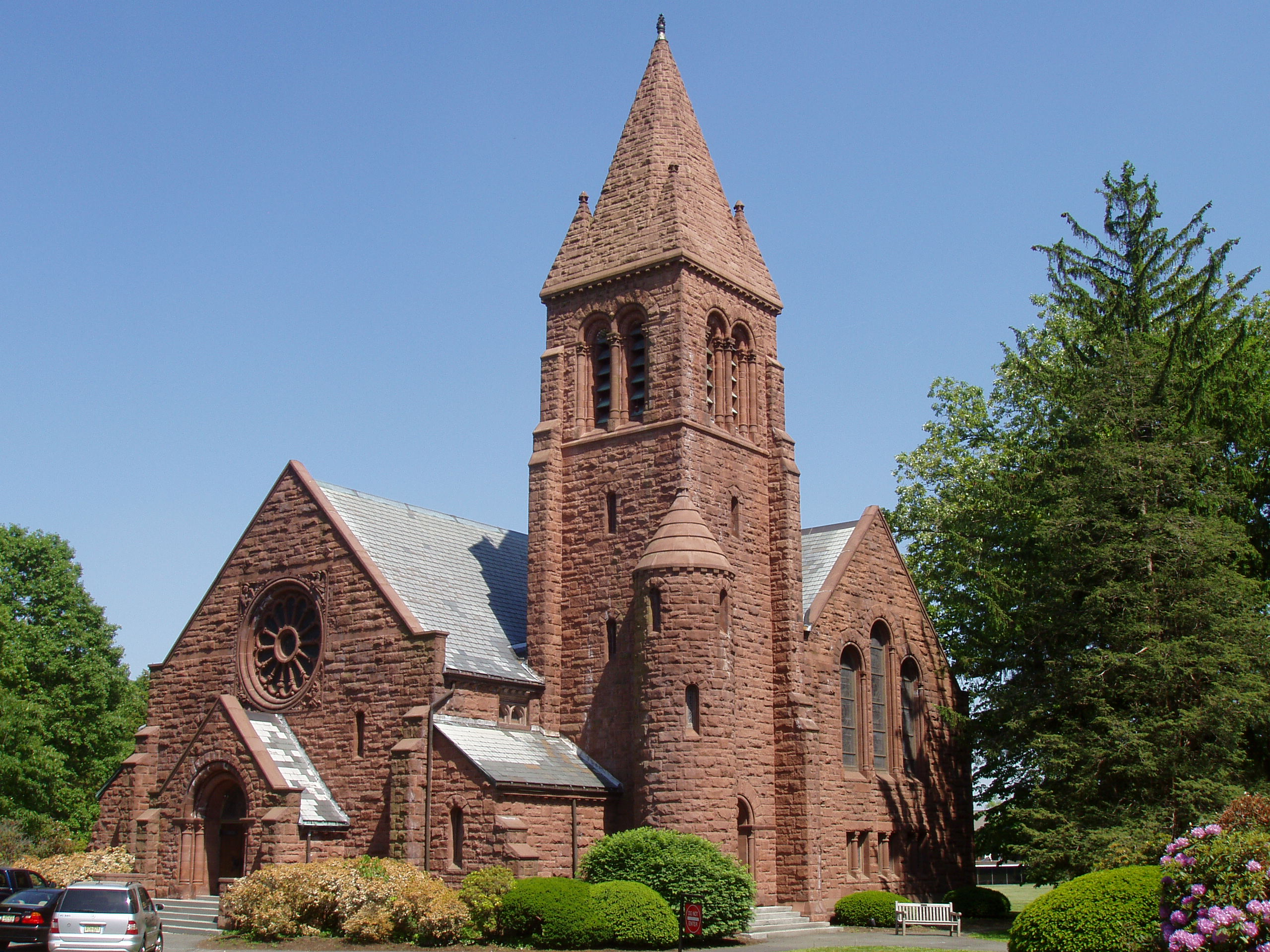
Edith Memorial Chapel at Lawrenceville School, where Buechner attended high school

Buechner then attended the Lawrenceville School in Lawrenceville, New Jersey, graduating in 1943. While at Lawrenceville, he met the future Pulitzer Prize winning poet James Merrill; their friendship and rivalry inspired the literary ambitions of both. As Mel Gussow wrote in Merrill's 1995 obituary: "their friendly competition was an impetus for each becoming a writer." Buechner then enrolled at Princeton University. His college career was interrupted by—in Buechner's words—"two years of very undistinguished service" (1944–46) in the Army during World War II, "all of it at several different places in the United States," including a post as "chief of the statistical section in Camp Pickett, Virginia." After the war, he returned to Princeton and graduated with an A.B. in English in 1948 after completing a 77-page senior thesis titled "Notes of the Function of Metaphor in English Poetry." However, as an alumnus, he remained identified as a member of his original Class of 1947. Regarding his time at Princeton, Buechner commented in an interview:

I really knew two Princetons. The first one was during the war, when everybody was being drafted or enlisting. It was just one drunken farewell party after another. Nobody did any work. I didn't learn anything at all. I was in the Army for two years. When I came back, I was so delighted to be free again that I buckled down and learned a few things.

=== Literary success and ordination ===
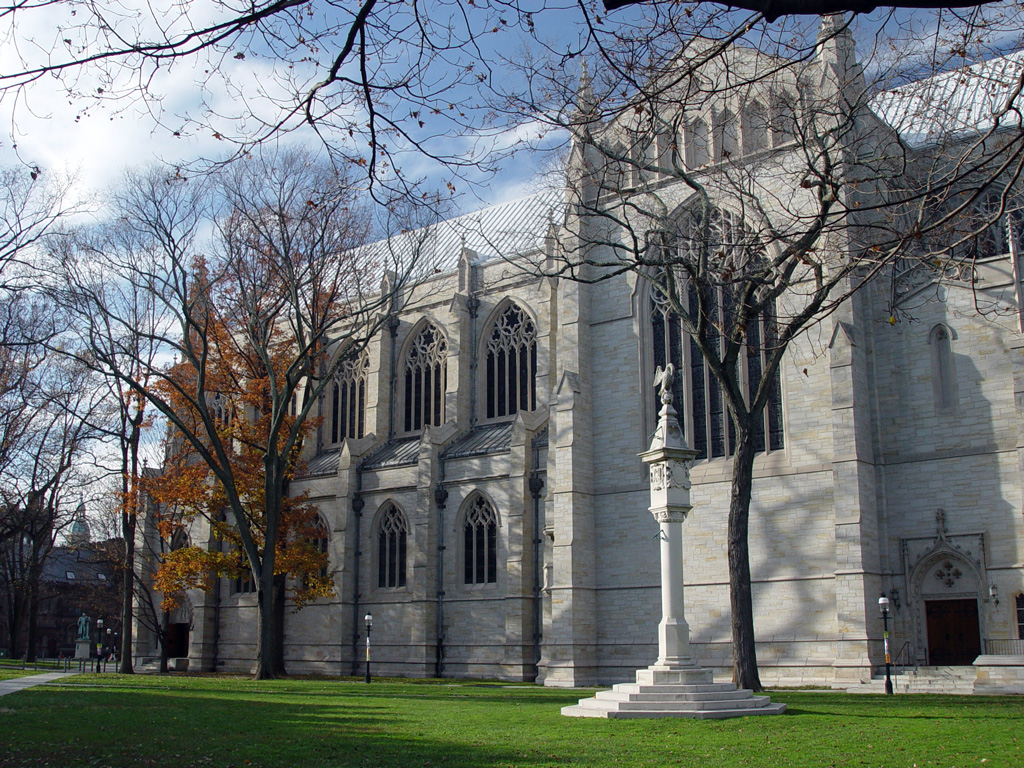
Chapel at Princeton University, Buechner's alma mater

During his senior year at Princeton University, Buechner received the Irene Glascock Prize for poetry, and he also began working on his first novel and one of his greatest critical successes: A Long Day's Dying, published in 1950. The contrast between the success of his first novel and the commercial failure of his second, The Seasons' Difference (1952), a novel with characters based on Buechner and his adolescent friend James Merrill which developed a more explicit Christian theme, was palpably felt by the young novelist, and it was on this note that Buechner left his teaching position at Lawrenceville to move to New York City and focus on his writing career. In 1952, Buechner began lecturing at New York University and once again received critical acclaim for his short story "The Tiger", published in The New Yorker, which won the O. Henry Award Third Prize in 1955. Also during this time, he began attending the Madison Avenue Presbyterian Church, where George Buttrick was pastor. It was during one of Buttrick's sermons that Buechner heard the words that inspired his ordination: Buttrick described the inward coronation of Christ as taking place in the hearts of those who believe in him "among confession, and tears, and great laughter." The impact of this phrase on Buechner was so great that he eventually entered the Union Theological Seminary of Columbia University in 1954, on a Rockefeller Brothers Theological Fellowship.

While at Union, Buechner studied under such renowned theologians as Reinhold Niebuhr, Paul Tillich, and James Muilenburg, who helped Buechner in his search for understanding:

I wanted to learn about Christ – about the Old Testament, which had been his Bible, and the New Testament, which was the Bible about him; about the history of the church, which had been founded on the faith that through him God had not only revealed his innermost nature and his purpose for the world, but had released into the world a fierce power to draw people into that nature and adapt them to that purpose ... No intellectual pursuit had ever aroused in me such intense curiosity, and much more than my intellect was involved, much more than my curiosity aroused. In the unfamiliar setting of a Presbyterian church, of all places, I had been moved to astonished tears which came from so deep inside me that to this day I have never fathomed them, I wanted to learn more about the source of those tears and the object of that astonishment.

Buechner's decision to enter the seminary had come as a great surprise to those who knew him. Even George Buttrick, whose words had so inspired Buechner, observed that, "It would be a shame to lose a good novelist for a mediocre preacher." Nevertheless, Buechner's ministry and writing have ever since served to enhance each other's message.

Following his first year at Union, Buechner decided to take the 1955–56 school year off to continue his writing. In the spring of 1955, shortly before he left Union for the year, Buechner met his wife Judith at a dance given by some family friends. They were married a year later by James Muilenburg in Montclair, N.J., and spent the next four months traveling in Europe. During this year, Buechner also completed his third novel, The Return of Ansel Gibbs.

After his sabbatical, Buechner returned to Union to complete the two further years necessary to receive a Bachelor of Divinity. He was ordained on June 1, 1958, at the same Madison Avenue Presbyterian Church where he had heard George Buttrick preach four years earlier. Buechner was ordained as an evangelist, or minister without pastoral charge. Shortly before graduation, as he considered his future role as minister of a parish, he received a letter from Robert Russell Wicks, formerly the Dean of the Chapel at Princeton, who had since begun serving as school minister at Phillips Exeter Academy. Wicks offered him the job of instituting a new, full-time religion department at Exeter; Buechner decided to take the opportunity to return to teaching and to develop a program that taught religion in depth.

=== Exeter ===
In September 1958, the Buechners moved to Exeter. There, Buechner faced the challenge of creating a new religion department and academically rigorous curriculum that would challenge the often cynical views of his new students. "My job, as I saw it, was to defend the Christian faith against its 'cultured despisers,' to use Schleiermacher's phrase. To put it more positively, it was to present the faith as appealingly, honestly, relevantly, and skillfully as I could." During his tenure at Exeter, Buechner taught courses in both the Religion and English departments and served as school chaplain and minister. Also during this time, the family grew to include three daughters. For the school year 1963–64, the Buechners took a sabbatical on their farm in Rupert, Vermont, during which time Buechner returned to his writing; his fourth book, The Final Beast, was published in 1965. As the first book he had written since his ordination, The Final Beast represented a new style for Buechner, one in which he combined his dual callings as minister and as author.

Buechner recalls of his accomplishments at Exeter: "All told, we were there for nine years with one year's leave of absence tucked in the middle, and by the time we left, the religion department had grown from only one full-time teacher, namely myself, and about twenty students, to four teachers and something in the neighborhood, as I remember, of three hundred students or more." Among these students was the future author John Irving, who included a quotation from Buechner as an epigraph of his book A Prayer for Owen Meany. One of Buechner's biographers, Marjorie Casebier McCoy, describes the effect of his time at Exeter as follows: "Buechner in his sermons had been attempting to reach out to the "cultured despisers of religion." The students and faculty at Phillips Exeter had been, for the most part, just that when he had arrived at the school, and it had been they who compelled him to hone his preaching and literary skills to their utmost in order to get a hearing for Christian faith."

=== Vermont and last years ===
In the summer of 1967, after nine years at Exeter and having established the Religion Department, Buechner moved with his family to their farmhouse in Vermont to live year round. Buechner describes their house in Now and Then:

Our house is on the eastern slope of Rupert Mountain, just off a country road, still unpaved then, and five miles from the nearest town ... Even at the most unpromising times of year – in mudtime, on bleak, snowless winter days – it is in so many unexpected ways beautiful that even after all this time I have never quite gotten used to it. I have seen other places equally beautiful in my time, but never, anywhere, have I seen one more so.

There Buechner dedicated himself full time to writing. However, in 1968, Buechner received a letter from Charles Price, the chaplain at Harvard, inviting him to give the Noble Lectures series in the winter of 1969. His predecessors in this role included Richard Niebuhr and George Buttrick, and Buechner was both flattered and daunted by the idea of joining so august a group. When he voiced his concerns, Price replied that he should write "something in the area of 'religion and letters.'" Thence came the idea to write about the everyday events of life, Buechner writes in Now and Then: "as the alphabet through which God, of his grace, spells out his words, his meaning, to us. So The Alphabet of Grace was the title I hit upon, and what I set out to do was to try to describe a single representative day of my life in a way to suggest what there was of God to hear in it."

Buechner continued to publish occasionally; his last book, A Crazy, Holy Grace: The Healing Power of Pain and Memory, a collection of essays, was released in 2017.

Buechner died on August 15, 2022, at his home in Rupert, Vermont.

== Writing ==
=== Early writing ===
The publication of A Long Day's Dying catapulted Buechner into early and, in his own words, "undeserved" fame. Of his debut novel, Buechner wrote:

I took the title from a passage in Paradise Lost where Adam says to Eve that their expulsion from Paradise "will prove no sudden but a slow pac'd evil,/ A Long Day's Dying to augment our pain," and with the exception of the old lady Maroo, what all the characters seem to be dying of is loneliness, emptiness, sterility, and such preoccupation with themselves and their own problems that they are unable to communicate with each other about anything that really matters to them very much. I am sure that I chose such a melancholy theme partly because it seemed effective and fashionable, but I have no doubt that, like dreams generally, it also reflected the way I felt about at least some dimension of my own life and the lives of those around me.

Conductor and composer Leonard Bernstein commented on the novel:

I have rarely been so moved by a perception. Mr. Buechner shows a remarkable insight into one of the least easily expressible tragedies of modern man; the basic incapacity of persons really to communicate with one another. That he has made this frustration manifest, in such a personal and magnetic way, and at the age of twenty-three, constitutes a literary triumph.

A Long Day's Dying continues to be one of Buechner's most successful works, both critically and commercially (it was reissued in 2003). However, his second novel, The Season's Difference, published in 1952, in Buechner's words, "fared as badly as the first one had fared well."

The publication of Buechner's third novel, The Return of Ansel Gibbs (written while on sabbatical from Union Theological Seminary) coincided with Buechner's ordination and move to Exeter, where he began to publish non-fiction.

=== Nonfiction and memoirs ===
Buechner's works of non-fiction, which cover several sub-genres including sermons, daily reflections, and memoirs, altogether outnumber his works of fiction. His first such work, The Magnificent Defeat, is a collection of sermons, signifying his growth into his career as a minister at Exeter. Throughout his career, he published several more volumes of sermons, most recently Secrets in the Dark: a life in sermons, which includes a "more or less [chronological] culling" of his sermons, "together with the most recent and hitherto unpublished ones."

To date, Buechner's corpus of memoir includes four volumes: The Sacred Journey (1982), Now and Then (1983), Telling Secrets (1991), and The Eyes of the Heart (1999). Of all his books, The Sacred Journey and Telling Secrets consistently rank among his bestselling. Of his interest in memoir, Buechner wrote in the introduction to The Sacred Journey:

About ten years ago I gave a set of lectures at Harvard in which I made the observation that all theology, like all fiction, is at its heart autobiography, and that what a theologian is doing essentially is examining as honestly as he can the rough-and-tumble of his own experience with all its ups and downs, its mysteries and loose ends, and expressing in logical, abstract terms the truths about human life and about God that he believes he has found implicit there. More as a novelist than as a theologian, more concretely than abstractly, I determined to try to describe my own life as evocatively and candidly as I could in the hope that such glimmers of theological truth as I believed I had glimpsed in it would shine through my description more or less on their own. It seemed to me then, and seems to me still, that if God speaks to us at all in this world, if God speaks anywhere, it is into our personal lives that he speaks.

Buechner's most recent publications include Buechner 101: Essays and Sermons by Frederick Buechner (2014), The Remarkable Ordinary: How to Stop, Look, and Listen to Life (2017), and A Crazy, Holy Grace: The Healing Power of Pain and Memory (2017).

=== Later novels: The Book of Bebb, Godric, Brendan ===
Concurrent with Buechner's delivery of the Noble Lectures, he developed the most significant character of his later career, Leo Bebb.

The Book of Bebb tetralogy proved to be one of Buechner's most well-known works. Published in the years from 1972 to 1977, it brought Buechner to a much wider audience, and gained him very positive reviews (Lion Country, the first book in the series, was a finalist for the National Book Award in 1971). Of writing the series, Buechner says: "I had never known a man like Leo Bebb and was in most ways quite unlike him myself, but despite that, there was very little I had to do by way of consciously, purposefully inventing him. He came, unexpected and unbidden, from a part of myself no less mysterious and inaccessible than the part where dreams come from; and little by little there came with him a whole world of people and places that was as heretofore unknown to me as Bebb was himself." In this series, Buechner experimented for the first time with first-person narrative, and discovered that this, too, opened new doors. His next work, Godric, published in 1980, was nominated for the Pulitzer Prize. The novel, a historical fiction, is written in the first person from the perspective of Saint Godric of Finchale, a 12th-century English hermit.

Brendan (1987), a work of historical fiction like Godric, draws from the life of the 6th-century Irish monk Saint Brendan the Navigator. Experimenting further with the narrative technique Buechner employed to such dramatic effect in Godric, Brendan interweaves history and legend in an evocative portrayal of the sixth-century Irish saint as seen through the eyes of Finn, his childhood friend and loyal follower. Buechner's colorful recreation of the Celtic world of fifteen hundred years ago earned him the Christianity and Literature Belles Lettres Prize in 1987.

== Tributes and legacy ==
Awards
Year	Award	Ref.
1947	Irene Glascock Prize for Poetry	
1955	O. Henry Award for "The Tiger" (3rd prize)	
1959	Rosenthal Award for The Return of Ansel Gibbs	
1972	National Book Award for Fiction for Lion Country (finalist)	
1981	Pulitzer Prize for Fiction for Godric (finalist)	
1982	American Academy and Institute of Arts and Letters	
1993	Christianity and Literature Book of the Year Award for Son of Laughter	
1994	Critics' Choice Books Award for Fiction for Son of Laughter	
	Nomination for Chautauqua South Florida Fiction Award for The Storm	
2007	Lifetime Achievement Award from the Conference on Christianity and Literature	

Honorary doctorates
Year	Honor	Ref.
1982	Virginia Theological Seminary	
1984	Lafayette College	
1987	Lehigh University	
1989	Cornell College	
1990	Yale University	
1996	The University of the South	
1998	Susquehanna University	
2000	Wake Forest University	
2008	King College	

In 2001, Californian rock band Daniel Amos released a double album titled Mr. Buechner's Dream. The album contains over thirty songs and pays tribute to Frederick Buechner, "who has been a major inspiration on the band's lyrics for years."

In the words of The Reverend Samuel Lloyd, former dean of Washington National Cathedral, Buechner's words "have nurtured the lives of untold seekers and followers" through "his capacity to see into the heart of every day":

Buechner's theological efforts are never systematic treatises but instead short, highly literary productions in most of which he draws explicit links with fiction-writing generally and his own fiction in particular...Buechner's 1969 Noble Lectures at Harvard, published in 1970 as The Alphabet of Grace, comprise a slender volume which is one of his most important and revealing works. Here the intimate relationship Buechner sees among fiction, theology, and autobiography is first made clear and fully embodied; and the book itself is a thoroughly lyrical piece.

Buechner's combination of literary style with approachable subject matter has affected contemporary Christian literature: "In my view," writes his biographer Marjorie McCoy, "Buechner is doing a distinctively new thing on the literary scene, writing novels that are theologically exciting without becoming propaganda, and doing theology with artistic style and imagination." Buechner's earliest works, written before his entrance into Union Theological Seminary, were hailed as profoundly literary works, notable for their dense, descriptive style. Of his first novel, A Long Day's Dying, David Daiches wrote: "There is a quality of civilized perception here, a sensitive and plastic handling of English prose and an ability to penetrate to the evanescent core of a human situation, all proclaiming major talent." From this promising beginning, however, it has been the application of Buechner's literary talent to theological issues that has continued to fascinate his audience:

Frederick Buechner has been one of our most interesting and least predictable writers. Others might have repeated their success or failures, but he has not. From the sophisticated urban world of that first book, through The Return of Ansel Gibbs with its world of politics and public affairs, to the private, half-haunted pastoral world of The Entrance to Porlock, he has created a series of novels of startlingly different moods and manners, people and places. The one constant has been the masterful use of great stylistic powers to organize and control his highly original and complex vision of life.

— Christopher Isherwood, USA Today

Of his more recent style, the pastor and author Brian D. McLaren says:

I have no desire to analyze what makes Buechner's writing and preaching so extraordinary. Neither do I want to account for Bob Dylan's raspy mystique, the peculiar beauty of a rainbow trout in a riffle, or a thunderstorm's magnetic terror. I simply want to enjoy them. They all knock me out of analysis and smack me clear into pleasure and awe.

Throughout Buechner's work his hallmark as a theologian and autobiographer is his regard for the appearance of the divine in daily life. By examining the day-to-day workings of his own life, Buechner seeks to find God's hand at work, thus leading his audience by example to similar introspection. The Reverend Samuel Lloyd describes his "capacity to see into the heart of every day," an ability that reflects the significance of daily events onto the reader's life as well. In the words of the preacher Barbara Brown Taylor: "From [Buechner] I've learned that the only limit to the revelation going on all around me is my willingness to turn aside and look."

=== Buechner Writer's Workshop at Princeton ===
Princeton Theological Seminary hosts an annual Buechner Writing Workshop. The workshop is designed to "encourage, educate, and inspire writers to communicate their Christian faith with clarity and power in the tradition of Frederick Buechner". Past speakers have included authors such as Barbara Brown Taylor, Rachel Held Evans, Philip Gulley, M. Craig Barnes, Philip Yancey, and Kathleen Norris (poet).

=== Buechner Institute at King University ===
Inaugurated in 2008 at King University, the former King College, the Buechner Institute was dedicated to the work and example of Buechner, exploring the intersections and collisions of faith and culture that define our times.

Dale Brown, the founding director of the Buechner Institute, was the author of numerous articles and the recent critical biography, The Book of Buechner: A Journey Through His Writings.

The Buechner Institute sponsored weekly convocations in Memorial Chapel on the campus of King University that featured speakers from a variety of backgrounds who examined the ways in which faith informs art and public life and cultivate conversation about what faith has to do with books, politics, social discourse, music, visual arts, and more.

Additionally, the Buechner Institute sponsored the Annual Buechner Lecture. The following is the list of lecturers invited to speak thus far:

- 2008: Frederick Buechner (inaugural lecture)
- 2009: Barbara Brown Taylor
- 2010: Ron Hansen
- 2011: Katherine Paterson
- 2012: Marilynne Robinson
- 2013: Kathleen Norris (poet)
- 2013: Doug Worgul

A summer symposium on the work of Frederick Buechner, Buechnerfest, was featured in 2010 and 2012. Attendees from around the country spent a week of reading and entertainment on the Virginia/Tennessee border.

The work of the institute was guided by a local governing board and a national advisory board. National board members included Doris Betts, Walter Brueggemann, Scott Cairns, Michael Card, Elizabeth Dewberry, Tim Gautreaux, Philip Gulley, Ron Hansen, Roy Herron, Silas House, Richard Hughes, Thomas G. Long, Tom Lynch, Brian McLaren, Carrie Newcomer, Kathleen Norris, Katherine Paterson, Eugene H. Peterson, Charles Pollard, Barbara Brown Taylor, Will Willimon, John Wilson, Philip Yancey, Doug Worgul, and others.

In 2015, after the death of Dr. Dale Brown, founding director, and at the request of the Buechner Literary Assets, LLC, the Buechner Institute became the King Institute for Faith and Culture. The King Institute for Faith and Culture is a continuation of conversations between faith, art, and culture started by the Buechner Institute.

== In the media ==
Buechner's work has been praised highly by many reviewers of books, with the distinct exception of his second novel, The Season's Difference, which was universally panned by critics and remains his biggest commercial flop. His later novels, including the Book of Bebb series and Godric, received praise; in his 1980 review of Godric, Benjamin DeMott summed up a host of positive reviews, saying "All on his own, Mr. Buechner has managed to reinvent projects of self-purification and of faith as piquant matter for contemporary fiction, producing in a single decade a quintet of books each of which is individual in concerns and knowledge, and notable for literary finish." In 1982, author Reynolds Price greeted Buechner's The Sacred Journey as "a rich new vein for Buechner – a kind of detective autobiography" and "[t]he result is a short but fascinating and, in its own terms, beautifully successful experiment."

Buechner has occasionally been accused of being too "preachy;" a 1984 review by Anna Shapiro in the New York Times notes "But for all the colloquialism, there is something, well, preachy and a little unctuous about making yourself an exemplar of faith. Insights that would do for a paragraph are dragged out with a doggedness that will presumably bring the idea home to even the most resistant and inattentive." The sentiments expressed by Cecelia Holland's 1987 Washington Post review of Buechner's novel, Brendan, are far more common. She writes,"In our own time, when religion is debased, an electronic game show, an insult to the thirsty soul, Buechner's novel proves again the power of faith, to lift us up, to hold us straight, to send us on again."

In 2008 Rich Barlowe wrote of Buechner in The Boston Globe, "Who knows? The words are Frederick Buechner's mantra. Over the course of an hourlong chat with the writer and Presbyterian minister in his kitchen, they recur any number of times in response to questions about his faith and theology. Dogmatic religious believers would dismiss the two words as the warning shot of doubt. But for Buechner, it is precisely our doubts and struggles that mark us as human. And that insight girds his theological twist on Socrates: The unexamined human life is a lost chance to behold the divine." In 2002, Richard Kauffman interviewed Buechner for The Christian Century upon the publication of Speak What We Feel (Not What We Ought to Say). Buechner answered the question "Do you envision a particular audience when you write?" by saying "I always hope to reach people who don't want to touch religion with a ten-foot pole. The cultured despisers of religion, Schleiermacher called them. Maybe some of my books reach them. But most of my readers, as far as I can tell, aren't that type. Many of them are ministers. They say, 'You've given us something back we lost and opened up doors we didn't think could be opened for people.'"

== Bibliography ==
=== Selected bibliography ===
- A Long Day's Dying, 1950 (ISBN 978-0972429542)
- The Seasons' Difference, 1952
- The Return of Ansel Gibbs, 1958
- The Magnificent Defeat, 1966 (ISBN 9780060611743)
- Telling the Truth: the Gospel as tragedy, comedy, and fairy tale, 1977 (ISBN 9780060611569)
- The Book of Bebb, 1979 (ISBN 9780062517692)
- Godric, 1980 (ISBN 9780060611620)
- The Sacred Journey, 1982 (ISBN 9780060611835)
- Now and Then: A Memoir of Vocation, 1983 (ISBN 9780060611828)
- Brendan, 1987 (ISBN 9780060611781)
- Telling Secrets, a Memoir, 1991 (ISBN 9780060611811)
- Listening to Your Life: Daily Meditations with Frederick Buechner, 1992 (ISBN 9780060698645)
- The Eyes of the Heart: A Memoir of the Lost and Found, 1999 (ISBN 9780062516398)
- Secrets in the Dark: A Life in Sermons, 2006 (ISBN 978-0-06-084248-2)

== See also ==
- C. S. Lewis
- Henri Nouwen
- John Milton
- Emerging church
