= Muilenburg =

Muilenburg is a Dutch surname. Notable people with the surname include:

- Dennis Muilenburg (born 1964), American engineer, businessman, and former CEO of Boeing
- James Muilenburg (1896–1974), American Bible scholar
- Walter J. Muilenburg (1893–1958), American writer
