= The Magnificent Defeat =

1966 religious anthology by Frederick Buechner

- Author: Frederick Buechner
- Language: English
- Genre: Anthology
- Publisher: Seabury Press, NY
- Publication date: 1966
- Followed by: The Hungering Dark

The Magnificent Defeat is a collection of meditations on Christianity and faith by Frederick Buechner. It was first conceived as a series of sermons, delivered at the Phillips Exeter Academy throughout 1959. It was subsequently published by Seabury Press, NY, in 1966. The Magnificent Defeat is Buechner’s first non-fiction publication.

== Composition ==
Buechner delivered the sermons included in The Magnificent Defeat as the ‘new school minister’ at the Phillips Exeter Academy, a role he took in 1958 following his graduation from Union Theological Seminary, New York. In his autobiographical work, Now and Then (1983), Buechner reflects on the difficulties of writing and delivering sermons for a young and unreceptive audience, ‘most if not all of [whom] were there so much against both their wills and their principles’. He continues: ‘My job, as I saw it, was to defend the Christian faith against its “cultured despisers”, to use Schleiermacher’s phrase. To put it more positively, it was to present the faith as appealingly, honestly, relevantly, and skilfully as I could.’ Elsewhere, in another anthology of sermons titled Secrets in the Dark (2006), Buechner writes that ‘in keeping with the spirit of the time’, the majority of his students were ‘against almost everything – the Vietnam war, the government, anybody over thirty including their parents, the school, and especially religion’. In Now and Then, the author describes the ‘sheer terror’ of preaching to this congregation, in addition to his fellow faculty members, whom he describes as ‘often jaded, skeptical, sometimes even quite openly negative about the whole religious enterprise’. Marjorie Casebier McCoy writes that the effect of being faced with such a hostile audience on a weekly basis ‘compelled [Buechner] to hone his preaching and literary skills to their utmost in order to get a hearing for Christian faith.’

Now and Then also details the setting, the Phillips Exeter Academy Library, in which Buechner composed his sermons; the author describes himself, ‘sat in the library in a deep leather armchair with my feet on the radiator’. In Secrets in the Dark the author also reveals that several of the sermons featured in The Magnificent Defeat became ‘the germ of a novel’, which was later written and published as The Son of Laughter (1993). A number of the sermons preached at Exeter and not published in The Magnificent Defeat were later anthologised in The Hungering Dark (1968).

== Major themes ==
The topics of Buechner’s sermons vary, and they meditate on a selection of texts from the Old and New Testament. As with many of his other works, the addresses included in The Magnificent Defeat meditate upon the possibility of faith and of God’s action in the world, especially in the mundane. As the author acknowledges in Now and Then, the sermons are also often offer an apologetic for Christianity and for faith. Jeffrey Munroe places particular significance upon the volume, writing that 'the theological convictions worked out in these pages would stick with Buechner for the rest of his career.' Buechner scholar Dale Brown notes particularly the presence of the theme of doubt, writing that 'the issue of doubt is never far from the surface' in The Magnificent Defeat, and that, within the anthology, 'it is the very impossibility of proof that Buechner sees as the gap that God occupies.'

In the ‘Introductory Note’ to The Magnificent Defeat, Buechner names James Muilenburg, George Buttrick, John Knox, Paul Scherer, and Robert Russell Wicks as influences for both the style and substance of his preaching. The author reflects at length in Now and Then on the influence of Karl Barth, particularly his essay ‘The Need for Christian Preaching’, upon the sermons included in the anthology: ‘These words of Barth’s were extremely powerful words to me, seemed extremely honest and, as far as I could tell, extremely true; and in all my preaching at Exeter and ever since I have been guided by them.’
