= The Son of Laughter =

1993 novel by Frederick Buechner

- Author: Frederick Buechner
- Language: English
- Publisher: HarperCollins
- Publication date: 1993
- Preceded by: The Wizard's Tide
- Followed by: On the Road with the Archangel

The Son of Laughter is the twelfth novel by the American author and theologian, Frederick Buechner. The novel was first published in 1993 by Harper, San Francisco. In the same year it was named ‘Book of the Year’ by the Conference on Christianity and Literature.

== Plot summary ==
Buechner relays the well-known Genesis narrative from the perspective of his protagonist, Jacob, whose reminiscences on his life are rendered somewhat cloudy by his considerable age.

Beginning in Mesopotamia, the narrator recounts his sojourn in the house of his uncle, Laban – a wealthy livestock owner, and worshipper of local deities. Jacob’s attempt to marry Laban’s beautiful youngest daughter, Rachel, is thwarted by his uncle, who tricks him into a union with his older daughter, Leah. Following several further years in the house of Laban, Jacob makes off with his wives, much of his uncle’s livestock, and, unbeknown to him hidden in Rachel’s tent, his household Gods.

Following an emotional confrontation with Laban, the young man is faced with the uncertainty of meeting his estranged elder brother, Esau, whose birth right the younger brother had previously stolen. Reflecting on the meeting that will take place the following day, as Jacob takes a night walk along the banks of the ford of Jabbok he is met by a mysterious figure, with whom he wrestles until early morning. Demanding that the figure bless him before taking his leave, Jacob realises that the man is not a man, but an angelic being. Against all prediction, Esau welcomes his brother with open arms, and allows him safe passage through his lands; Jacob’s rejection of the Mesopotamian gods in favour of his father Isaac’s god, ‘The Fear’, appears to have served him well.

The old man’s reminiscences then reach back beyond his return to Canaan, to his memories of Isaac. His father’s great trauma, drawn from his own father Abraham’s attempt to sacrifice him on a lonely mountain only to have his knife stayed by the hand of God, has become a central theme of Jacob’s life also. The familiar story is told ‘through the eyes of a child, now an old man, who lived it’, as Jacob recalls his own sense of fear, sadness, and revulsion at his father’s weeping as he relays the tale of his suffering. Jacob further remembers attending Isaac’s rituals as a child, entering into a murky and airless tent with him, there to watch his father communicate with The Fear with much wailing and self-flagellation.

The family’s famine-induced flight to Gerar, under the direction of The Fear, results in further discomfort and scandal. Afraid that Rebekah’s beauty might provide a motive for the ruler of this new land to kill him, Isaac lies to King Abimelech, presenting her instead as his sister. Isaac’s shame at having told this lie sees him retreat further into himself, and, as his health begins to fail, the scene is set for Jacob’s great crime: the theft of Esau’s birth right. Having outstayed their welcome, the family retreat from Gerar, and, as Isaac’s trauma takes further hold of him, Rebekah begins to quietly encourage her son to fool his father into giving over Esau’s promised inheritance. Despite his dread that he might be caught, or, worse, that he might offend The Fear, Jacob steals Esau’s birth right, or, as he remembers it: ‘It was not I that ran off with my father’s blessing. It was my father’s blessing that ran off with me’.

The subsequent flight to the house of Laban in Mesopotamia, and the startling vision of a heavenly ladder on the way, are vividly recounted by the old man, as he recalls his slow journey across the years back toward The Fear, and his decision to renounce all household gods in favour of the deity who has haunted and blessed his father and grandfather before him. He remembers Rachel’s barrenness as a source of great torment, made more difficult by the prolific fruitfulness of Leah, who bears the young Jacob many sons. Rachel’s introduction of her own maid, Bilhah, into the sexual politics is quickly followed by the appearance of Zilpah, Leah’s maid, who is likewise compelled by her mistress to bed her master. In the midst of the chaos, Rachel conceives and gives birth to a son, Joseph. Despite his own isolating experience of his father’s favour toward his elder brother, Jacob repeats the error of Isaac, elevating Joseph above all of Leah’s children. As the family escape from the house of Laban, unbeknown to Jacob they are heading towards his climactic encounter with God at the ford of Jabbok, and beyond to further years of suffering and joy.

The suffering begins with the misdeeds of his sons, Levi and Simeon. Jealous of their sister Dinah’s romance with a young Canaanite, Shechem, they murder the boy, his father, and the men of their tribe. Jacob’s grief is compounded by justice meted out by The Fear, who first takes Rebekah’s aged nursemaid, Deborah, then Rachel, as she gives birth to her second son, Benjamin. When Jacob finally returns to the land of his father, accompanied by Esau, it is to discover that Isaac is dying. Since the younger son is still in possession of the older son’s birth right, when Isaac finally passes away it is Esau, not Jacob, who must pack up his family and livestock and move on from the land that should have been his.

As Jacob’s reminiscences enter into their final stage, he reflects on the life of Joseph, imagining the life of his favoured son through his own eyes. Joseph’s dreams, and his father’s gifts of a silver ring and a robe, engender a maddened envy among his overlooked half-brother. Jacob dreams of his son, shackled and filled with terror at the bottom of a well, having been thrown there by the sons of Leah. He imagines Joseph being sold into slavery, his journey to Egypt, and his sojourn as the slave of Potiphar. He sees his son in a prison cell, following Potiphar’s wife’s attempt to sleep with him, and her subsequent accusation that the young man has seduced her. Following his successful interpretation of the dreams of two fellow prisoners, Joseph is given the opportunity to read the dreams of the Pharaoh. His deciphering of the king’s visions is stark, and from them he predicts the coming of seven years of plenty, followed by seven years of famine. When the famine brings Joseph’s brothers down out of Canaan in search of food, and they are ushered into the presence of their brother, now the Vizier of Egypt, they do not recognise him. Jacob imagines the final struggle of his favourite son, torn between a desire to bring reconciliation and a desire for justice and revenge. Joseph’s obedience to The Fear’s promptings, and his decision to reveal his true identity and bring blessing to his family, is a source of joy and wonder for Jacob, who, for the rest of his days, reflects upon the apparent fulfilment of The Fear’s promise to his grandfather, Abraham: that he had been chosen ‘to breed a lucky people who would someday bring luck to the whole world’.

== Characters ==
- Jacob: In his 1966 collection of sermons, The Magnificent Defeat, Buechner identifies Jacob as a ‘shrewd and ambitious man who is strong on guts and weak on conscience, who knows very well what he wants and directs all his energies toward getting it’. Though no less morally ambiguous, in The Son of Laughter the character of Jacob has acquired further complexity. He remembers himself, perhaps favourably, as a confused, emotionally sensitive, and attentive young man, struggling to escape from the shackles of father’s story, lead his family through trial and hardship, and make sense of the deity that seems to be guiding his destiny. The intricacies of his life story, which is characterised by both his own ambitions and a paradoxical sense of helplessness, is made more complicated by the fact that he is his own interpreter. His childhood nickname, "Heels", is indicative of his role within the tale: he is both protagonist and antagonist, heel and hero.
- Isaac: Though often referred to by the translation of his name, ‘Laughter’, Isaac is a man haunted by his past. The attempt made by his father, Abraham, to sacrifice him – only halted by God’s timely provision of a ram as a substitute – proves to be the defining moment in his life. The ever-present memory of the event in his mind causes him to oscillate between grief and uncertainty, and joy and gratitude. His regular, mysterious encounters with his God, The Fear, prove to be a further source of paradox: he has direction, and yet is often lost; faith, but also crippling doubt; the promise of blessing, but also a life filled with tragedy. Fooled by his youngest son, Jacob, and his wife, Rebekah, Isaac hands over the blessing and birth right of his favoured son, Esau, bringing about great suffering for his family but also, strangely, their salvation.
- Rebekah: In contrast with her husband, Isaac, Rebekah is decisive, quick-witted, and driven. Motivated by a desire to see the legacy, land, and livestock of the family inherited by her youngest son, Isaac, she conceives a plan that will see it snatched from the hands of her eldest son, Esau, whom she judges to be unworthy of his father’s blessing. Her actions are the catalyst for great upheaval in the life of her family, yet their ultimate end is the rescue of her descendants from famine, and their receipt of the promised land.
- Esau: Born mere minutes before his younger brother, Jacob, Esau is a hirsute and bullish man, whose prowess as a hunter and cattle herder earns him great favour in the eyes of his father, Isaac. Though endowed with physical strength and skill, Esau does not possess the foresight of his younger brother, such that, in a fit of hunger and exhaustion after a day of work in the field, he is willing to hand over his birth right to Jacob in exchange for some food.
- Laban: The brother of Rebekah, and uncle to Jacob, Laban is a charismatic showman, trickster, and charlatan. As the owner of vast herds of livestock, Laban is able to support Jacob and his growing household as he desperately seeks the hand of his uncle’s youngest daughter, Rachel. Desiring both to see his eldest daughter Leah married, and to retain Jacob’s services, Laban fools the young man into marrying his eldest daughter, forcing him to tarry in Mesopotamia for a further seven years, before finally giving him the hand of Rachel.
- Leah: The oldest, and in Jacob’s eyes less desirable, of Laban’s two daughters, Leah is wise, vulnerable, and often hurt by her husband’s obvious preference for her sister. Though Leah is fruitful and bears him many children, Jacob’s elevation of Rachel’s sons above her own is a source of pain and jealousy. Despite this subtle and prolonged suffering, Leah becomes, in the words of Dale Brown, a ‘kind of friend’ and ‘confidante’ to her husband, and is a source of council, warning him as he cruelly punishes his sons for their attack on the people of Shechem that, ‘it is yourself you are killing’.
- Rachel: The youngest of Laban’s two daughters, Rachel is the immediate object of Jacob’s desire. The pain of being forced to share her beloved with her older sister is compounded by her inability to conceive children for him. Barrenness gives way to desperation, as Rachel sends her maidservant, Bilhah, into her husband’s bed with the hope that she will bear a child for him. This impulsiveness is seen elsewhere in the theft of her father’s household gods, which remain hidden and unacknowledged in her tent when he asks after them.

== Composition ==
The Son of Laughter was written by Buechner six years after the publication of his eleventh novel, Brendan. In the intervening years the author published several memoirs and theological works, including Whistling in the Dark: a doubter’s dictionary (1988), Telling Secrets: a memoir (1991), The Clown in the Belfry: writings on faith and fiction (1992), and Listening to Your Life: daily meditations with Frederick Buechner (1992).

In his autobiographical work, Now and Then (1983), Buechner recalls the beginning of his fascination with the Old Testament figure of Jacob in a class taught by James Muilenberg at Union Theological Seminary, New York. He describes the process of writing a ‘monumental Pentateuch paper’, in which he was forced to take a different perspective on the Old Testament. Buechner writes that this process informed his view, expressed most clearly in The Son of Laughter, that 'the Bible is not essentially, as I had always more or less supposed, a book of ethical principles, of moral exhortations, of cautionary tales about exemplary people, of uplifting thoughts-in fact'. Instead, he writes, it is 'a great, tattered compendium of writings, the underlying and unifying purpose of all of which is to show how God works through the Jacobs and Jabboks of history to make himself known to the world and to draw the world back to himself'.

Having concluded his studies at Union, Buechner was employed by Phillips Exeter Academy as the school minister in 1959. In Secrets in the Dark, Buechner remembers delivering a sermon on the Genesis narrative of Jacob, and the sense that the youthful congregation, usually resistant to sermons, 'were listening in spite of themselves'. He continues: 'I don't think it was so much my words that held them as it was just the haunting power of the biblical narrative itself-the stranger leaping out of the darkness, the struggle by the river bank, the strangled cry for blessing. Several years later, in his 1979 work, Peculiar Treasures, Buechner again returned to the topic of Jacob. In Secrets in the Dark, the author further reveals that this sermon delivered at Phillips Exeter Academy, and his subsequent meditations in Peculiar Treasures, became the source for his novel on the Genesis narrative. ‘In some deep way’, he continues, ‘I was apparently haunted myself because it turned out to be the germ of a novel about Jacob, The Son of Laughter, which I wrote some thirty years later.’ Buechner scholar Dale Brown also notes that during the year in which The Son of Laughter was being written, Buechner featured in the 1992 Trinity Lectures, alongside other noted authors and poets, including Maya Angelou and James Carroll.

== Themes ==
The Son of Laughter exemplifies those themes most often associated with Buechner’s work. Where all of his previous novels approach the topic of God from a post-incarnational perspective, in The Son of Laughter the narrator speaks with a pre-incarnational perspective. As such, there is a greater sense of discovery in the prose, which brings a sharpness to all the thematic expressions most commonly found within the Buechner corpus: doubt, grief, joy, anger, gratitude, and mystery. Buechner scholar Dale Brown adds that:

Buechner’s rendering of Jacob, the Old Testament trickster who came to be known as Israel, emphasizes the humanness of the father of nations – his loves and jealousies, his humiliations and bewilderments. Buechner imagines his way into the soaring faith and plunging despair of this rich character. Along the way, Buechner paints the weariness of day-to-day survival and offers a vision of an Old Testament world that adds color and depth to our assumptions about the times and the places. As with most of Buechner’s stories, however, the main character finally gets to be the reader, as Jacob’s struggles mirror our own.

Concerning Buechner’s return his favoured thematic strands, Brown writes that 'the remarkable success of the novel has more to do, I think, with the increasing clarity of Buechner’s themes, his way of keeping the paradoxes in order – natural verses supernatural, guilt verses forgiveness, doubt versus faith – and the way in which his characters and their questions are like his readers and their questions.

== Critical reception ==
Literary critics largely welcomed Buechner’s return to the genre of hagiography, albeit with some surprise at the choice of a Biblical figure for the focal point of the narrative. Lore Dickstein, writing in the New York Times, wondered if The Son of Laughter might best be characterised as a 'novelization' [], while James Cooke, in his review for Perspectives, called the novel a ‘flesh-and-blood portrait’. In his review, published in Theology Today, Eugene Peterson found both Buechner's rendering of Jacob and his broader experimentation with hagiography to be 'accessible and honest'. Eschewing any attempt to categorise The Son of Laughter, George Garrett noted that 'Buechner's career as a novelist has been a string of surprises’. A number of critics voiced approval at the author's choice of protagonist: Annie Dillard, in her review for the Boston Sunday Globe wrote that 'Buechner has taken the grand story of Jacob – breathed life into it and set its vivid people in motion', a sentiment echoed by Calvin Miller in the Southwest Journal of Theology, who wrote that Buechner 'has a way of telling us what we already know, so that we are glad we know it [, he makes the] predictable intriguing'.

As with The Book of Bebb, Godric, and Brendan, several critics also spoke approvingly of Buechner's innovative prose style. Linda-Marie Delloff found that the author had an ear for the 'likely sounds of speech from a distant time and place', while Irving Malin, in his review written for Commonweal, argued that Buechner's use of 'simple sentences' enabled him to effectively 'mirror the Hebraic style'. Buechner scholar Dale Brown, in his monograph, The Book of Buechner, concluded that, in The Son of Laughter, the author 'manages a pleasurable prose style while also capturing the crudity and rawness of the times'.

A number of critics praised Buechner's choice and handling of both subject matter and themes. In her study of Buechner's dialogue with psychological theory, Listening to Life: psychology and spirituality in the writings of Frederick Buechner, Victoria Allen argued that 'The Son of Laughter represented Buechner's most conscious use of psychological dynamics to reveal and explain spiritual truths'. Annie Dillard offered the further comment that the novel exuded 'profound intelligence’: ‘it displays and illuminates the seemingly unrelated mysteries of human character and ultimate ideas'. The reviewer for Christian Century called The Son of Laughter an ‘extraordinary novel that demonstrates both the truth of fiction and Buechner's superb ability to offer it’. Poet James Merrill, a close friend of Buechner's, notes that 'the Bible's account of Jacob is a pungent seed found in a tomb’. 'Frederick Buechner', he continues, 'has planted it and the result is this beautiful swaying tree of a book'.

The novel gave several critics pause to reflect on the career of its author. Irving Malin claimed that Buechner is 'at least as important as Flannery O'Connor and Walker Percy', while John Bookser Feister wrote in the National Catholic Reporter that the author belonged in the 'literary majors', and that his latest work was a 'masterpiece', a conclusion also reached by Douglas Auchincloss, who likewise labelled The Son of Laughter a 'masterpiece' in a review featured in Parabola. Dale Brown notes that the novel ‘was honoured as the Book of the Year by the Conference on Christianity and Literature, a group that had awarded Buechner its Belles Lettres prize in 1987’.
