= The Yellow Leaves =

Anthology book

- Author: Frederick Buechner
- Language: English
- Genre: Anthology
- Publication date: 2008
- Preceded by: Secrets in the Dark

The Yellow Leaves: A Miscellany is a collection of sermons, essays, short stories, and poetry authored by Frederick Buechner. Published in 2008 by Westminster John Knox Press, The Yellow Leaves is Buechner's sixteenth non-fiction work.

== Composition ==
The title for the anthology is derived from William Shakespeare's Sonnet 73. In his introduction, the author reveals that, at eighty years of age, he 'no longer has the right kind of energy' to write books, and that what follows is a collection of short pieces. The pieces in question are varied in nature. A number are brief memoirs. In his description of a year spent in Europe, the author recalls meeting Princess Margaret and Alice B. Toklas, and witnessing Pope Pius XII conduct a Christmas Eve mass at St. Peter's Basilica. Additionally, he reflects on the success enjoyed by his first novel, A Long Day's Dying, and the composition of his second novel, The Season's Difference. Elsewhere, Buechner also remembers a journey with his mother late in her life, his friendship with Maya Angelou, and briefly meeting Dwight D. Eisenhower, Franklin D. Roosevelt, and Harry S. Truman.

The anthology also includes a short story that was initially intended to form part of a fifth installment of the Bebb tetralogy, a brief reflection on Charles Dickens's A Christmas Carol, and a series of 'Family Poems'.

Buechner debuted several of the pieces featured in The Yellow Leaves at the inauguration of the Buechner Institute at King University (now the Institute for Faith and Culture). Publishers Weekly called the volume 'distinctly elegiac', while the reviewer for the Sewanee Theological Review noted that 'much of the book is about death'.
