= First Presbyterian Church (Buffalo, New York) =

Congregation in Buffalo, New York

Coordinates: 42.901386°N 78.881857°W

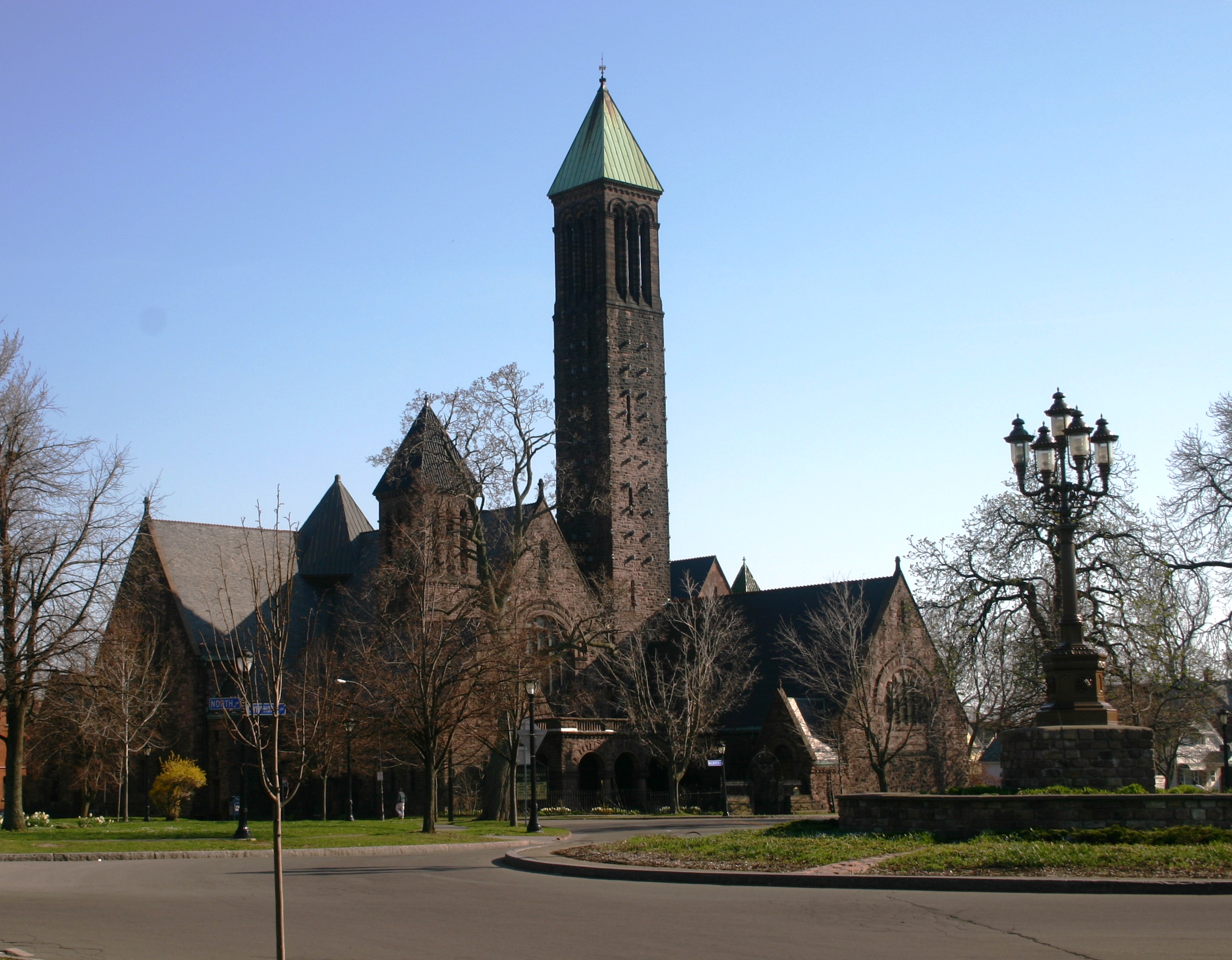
First Presbyterian Church of Buffalo, New York: April 2009

The First Presbyterian Church in Buffalo, New York was the first organized religious body formed in what was then the western frontier of New York State. The church is part of the Presbytery of Western New York which is part of the Synod of the Northeast, a regional body of the Presbyterian Church (USA). The town of Buffalo was sparsely populated when the church was organized on February 2, 1812. However, having survived the War of 1812, the town of Buffalo was rebuilt and rapidly grew with the completion of the Erie Canal in 1825. The first two buildings were located on the same downtown lot. However, the congregation relocated between 1889 and 1891 to its present location approximately one and-a-half miles to the north in a more residential area.

== Early years (1812–1824) ==
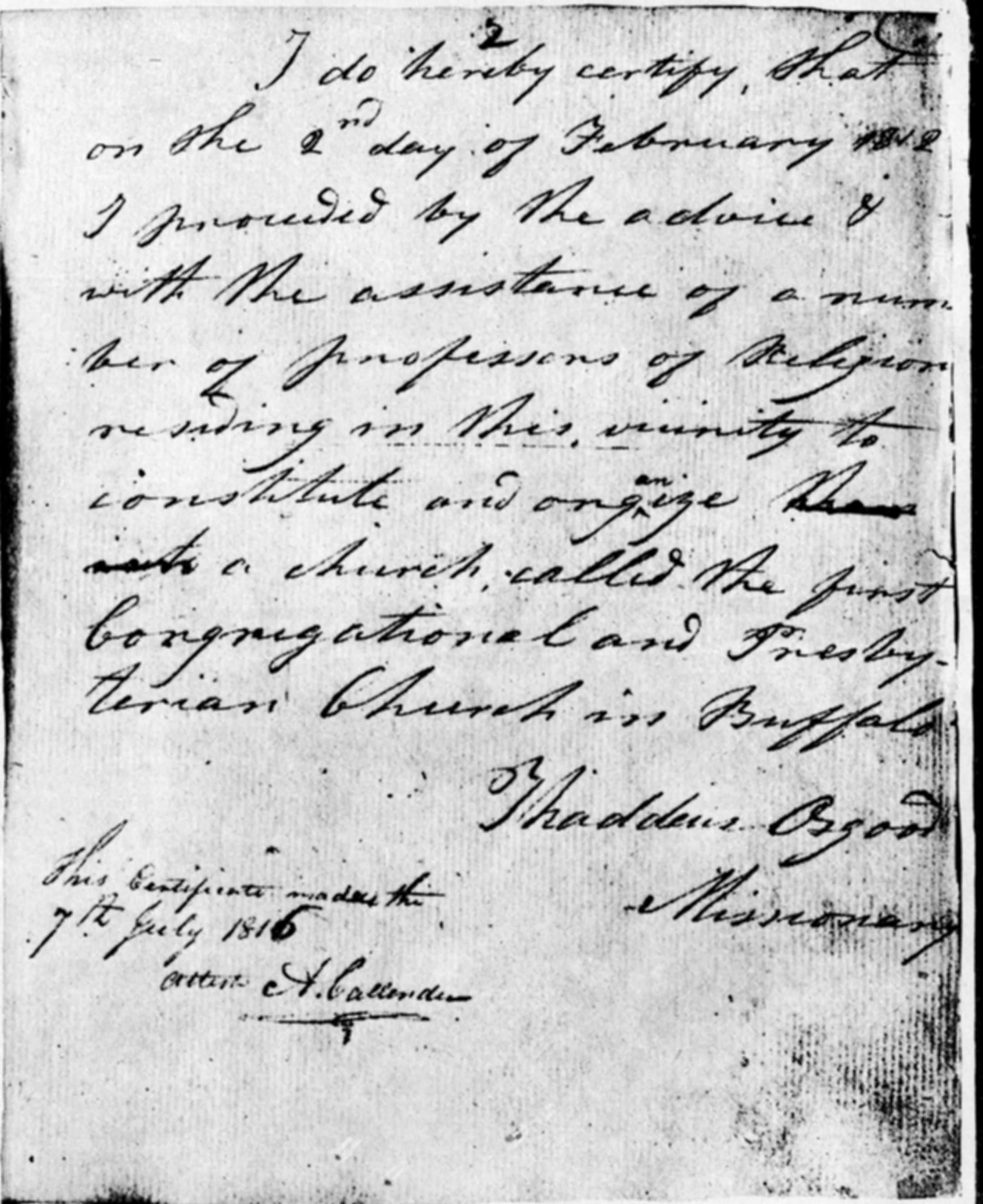
Thaddeus Osgood signed certification of the founding of the church in 1812

Organized February 2, 1812, by the traveling Missionary, Reverend Thaddeus Osgood during his fifth annual visit to the then village of Buffalo, "The First Presbyterian and Congregationalist Church of the town of Buffalo" as it was then known, was a small, but devoted group of pioneers, who could not afford a building of their own. Thus, services were held in either a schoolroom on Pearl St. near Swan, or at the home of Mrs. Esther Pratt, whose home was on the southwest corner of Main and Exchange Street (then called Crow Street). After the War of 1812, public worship was resumed as the work of reconstruction began. The faithful met in Landon's Tavern, or at the unfinished home of Deacon Amos Callender, located on the east side of Pearl Street (south of Swan Street), or at various locations around town such as the homes of other church members. Worship services were regularly held in the south room of the Old Court House building that was situated on Washington Street, (now the present site occupied by the Public Library) this arrangement was made until the first wooden building was constructed a few blocks to the south at "The Commons" which would later be renamed Shelton Square. On December 5, 1815, the church was formally incorporated as "The First Presbyterian Society of the Town of Buffalo" the trustees presented themselves on December 28, 1815, to Judge Charles Townsend, Judge of Niagara County, of which Erie County was then part, and the record of incorporation was duly recorded in the records on April 16, 1816.

== The wooden church (1824–1827) ==
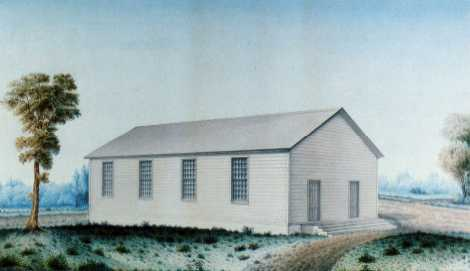
First Presbyterian Church of Buffalo, New York 1824–1827 building

This first church building, really only a lecture hall was only forty by fifty feet in size, it was a wooden building constructed per a contract with Mr. John Stacy, a church member. Authorized on December 24, 1822; and built on land donated by Joseph Ellicott (November 1, 1760 – August 19, 1826) of the Holland Land Company on December 12, 1820; the total cost of construction was $874; Mr. Stacy, however, deducted the cost of a pew for his own use. Thus, money raised from pew sales totaled $100 in excess over the cost of construction. This humble edifice, located on the northwest parcel of land at Main, Church & Niagara Streets was completed in May 1824. The building was on the northeast corner of the plot of land at Pearl Street and Niagara Street with the front of the building facing east, it had two doors in the front with the pulpit standing between those doors. Inside, the pews were square and were lit by candles supplied by the worshipers in the evening, at the west end of the building was a platform for the singers.

With the opening of the Erie Canal in 1825, and the powerful sermons preached by Rev. Gilbert Crawford, the church and city experienced a rapid growth in population which was mirrored by attendance growth in worship. With membership increasing from pre-Canal numbers of 120 to 203 after its opening, the church quickly outgrew this building and plans were obtained for a larger building.

The wooden frame structure remained next to the new Brick Church until it was sold to the Methodists in 1828, which moved it from the corner of Pearl and Niagara Streets; they had been using an even smaller building. Later, this original First Church building was sold around 1835 to the St. Peter's society, a German Evangelical Church congregation, who in turn moved it to their lot on the corner of Genesee and Hickory Streets before it finally ended up being moved to Walnut Street around 1878. This little building saw successive service thereafter as a school-house, a tenement and as a cooper's shop, before it finally fell completely from grace to become an icehouse for a brewery. It was destroyed by fire in 1882; thus ended the nearly sixty-year history of the first church building; no photographs of this structure are known to exist.

== The Brick Church, also known as "Old First" Church (1827–1890) ==
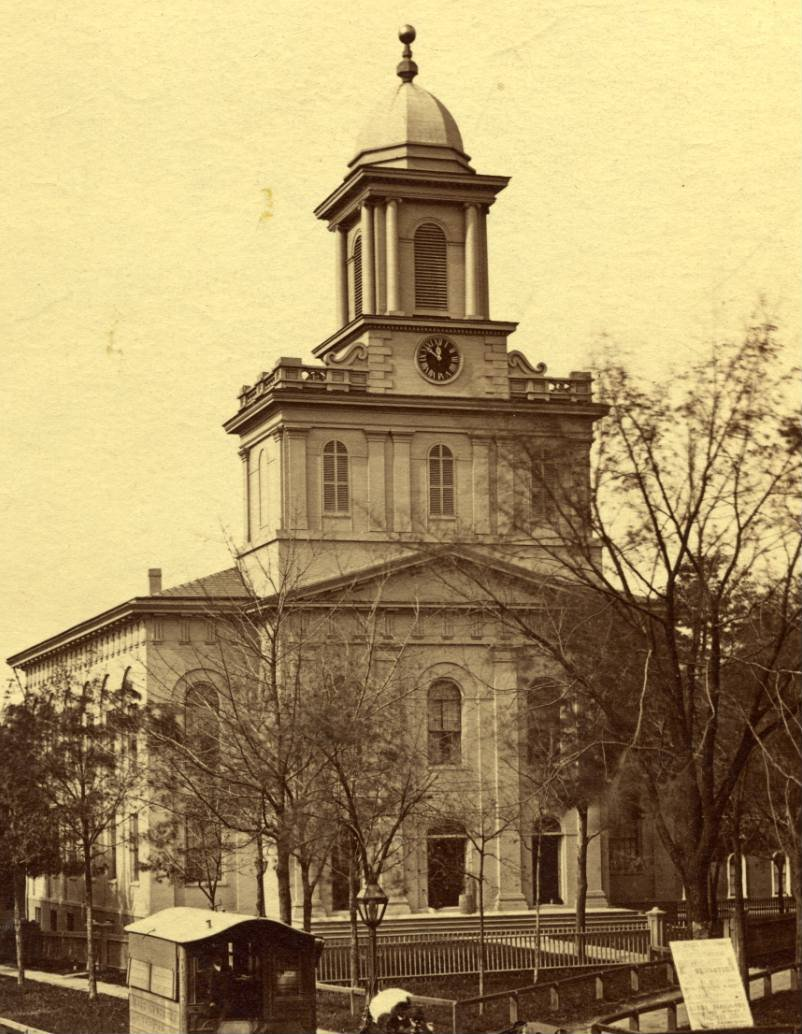
First Presbyterian Church of Buffalo, New York 1827–1890 building

The Brick Church, dedicated in March 1827, with a seating of approximately 800, was at the time of its dedication, the largest church building west of the Genesee River. An imposing, square red structure, trimmed in immaculate white, with a balustrade around the roof and a clock and bell tower surmounted by a golden ball that blazed in the sunlight, it served as a landmark for mariners on Lake Erie. Following some formalities by the congregations second pastor, Rev. Gilbert Crawford. Foster Young broke ground for the building with an oxen drawn plow starting at Main Street and working his way towards Pearl Street. Theodore Coburn furnished the mason work began on June 23, 1826, and was completed by September 22, 1826, before the inclement weather set in, thus, work could continue undisturbed inside during the winter months. Henry Brayman provided the woodwork; the total price for the construction was $17,500.00. Early church members played their part in assisting in the construction, for example, Joseph Stocking took time around noon to help carry bricks for the mason, while other members wheeled sand or lime to the site for mortar. On the day of the buildings dedication, on Wednesday, March 28, 1827, started at eleven o’clock, with everyone, participants, clergy, choir members all packed into the little wooden frame church that still stood to the north of the plot, and in a solemn procession marched the few hundred steps over to the new building. The dedication day service was three hours in length, and was led by Rev. Gilbert Crawford, D.D., assisted by former pastor Rev. Miles P. Squire, D.D., who traveled from his home in Geneva, New York, to attend the event, both offered prayers. The dedication sermon was preached by Rev. Ansel D. Eddy, the text from Luke 10:20. The choir, believed to have been led by William Ketchum, sang "I Was Glad" and "Lord, From Thine Inmost Glory, Send". During those early years, pews were "sold" to families or individuals subject to a pew tax of seven per cent, of the original valuation. The pew rental rate was increased several times during the years until it reached seventy-five per cent. Entrance to the church was through three large doors that opened into a high, spacious vestibule with circular stairways on the right and left that led to the upstairs gallery or balcony. Directly across from the center entrance was the middle door into the high, square, well-lit sanctuary that for many years was an unpainted white. The balcony that ran around three sides of the sanctuary was supported by wooden posts with the broad center isle leading to the front of the sanctuary where the old wooden pulpit was hung. The pulpit, supported by two Corinthian pillars of wood, was surmounted by a crimson cushion and was quite an imposing structure. A high crimson curtain hung behind the pulpit arranged in a row of straight folds or "flutes", like the pipes of a great organ topped with a straight lambrequin of the same material. The pulpit had doors on either side, similar to those in the pews below, from which the minister entered. Opposite the pulpit in the gallery was the choir loft, this opened from a large room that was directly over the vestibule where the choir practiced, and instruments were tuned.

The 50th anniversary of the church was a celebrated event where the longest-surviving church member, Dr. Bristol, (although not the oldest member of the church) addressed the congregation during the service; Dr. Bristol was also a member of session at that time. Prayers were led by Dr. Steilman of Dunkirk and Rev. Dr. Walter Clarke. Letters were read from former pastors Dr. Squier and Dr. Thompson, who were unable to attend in person. The choir sang "Every Star-Thirty-Four" with music by the organist, Mr. Degenhard.

The building exterior was in later years painted a warm grey, as shown in existing photographs. This was performed during an ambitious remodeling of the building between June and August 1870 where the original high pulpit was cut down and in its place, a platform was added three feet high, twenty feet wide and between eight and ten feet deep. This platform was again supported by two Corinthian columns. Matching curving banistered stairways were also added on each side at that time that led to the pulpit backed by a crimson curtain. All pews were lowered by three inches, black walnut railings added and the pew seats were upholstered in a crimson color. The ceiling was in a fresco painted by Sig. Garibolda. Anyone entering the church came through one of three great doors opening into the spacious vestibule, and visitors walked up the circular stairways at either end to the balcony around three sides of the high, square sanctuary. Such heat as there was came from wood stoves; the building was illuminated by oil lamps. Foot-warmers containing hot coals were indispensable for comfort during winter months. One such coal foot warmer that was used can be viewed in the Historical Hall located in the current building on Symphony Circle.

On each side of the pulpit that was on the west wall there were biblical passages that through close examination of existing interior photographs from 1877 and 1885, reproduced below were determined to be from the old King James Version. On the left side was a passage from Psalms 100 verses 2-5, and on the right side, Psalms 24: verses 2-5.

The church bell, known as the "town clock bell," weighed approximately 2500 pounds and had a clear, sonorous tone that could be heard great distances. The bell served not only the congregation, but the whole town as its fire alarm; it was while sounding an alarm of fire in 1833 while in this capacity that the bell cracked. However, it was soon recast and continued to serve in that capacity until 1891. Before the building was razed, the bell was presented to a church in Tonawanda, New York, and the front clock face was preserved before the property was sold to the Buffalo Savings Bank.

The congregation experienced tremendous growth during these early years, especially during the leadership of its first five pastors; it was in 1852 during the pastorate of Dr. Matthew La Rue Perrine Thompson that congregation first considered moving to a new location.

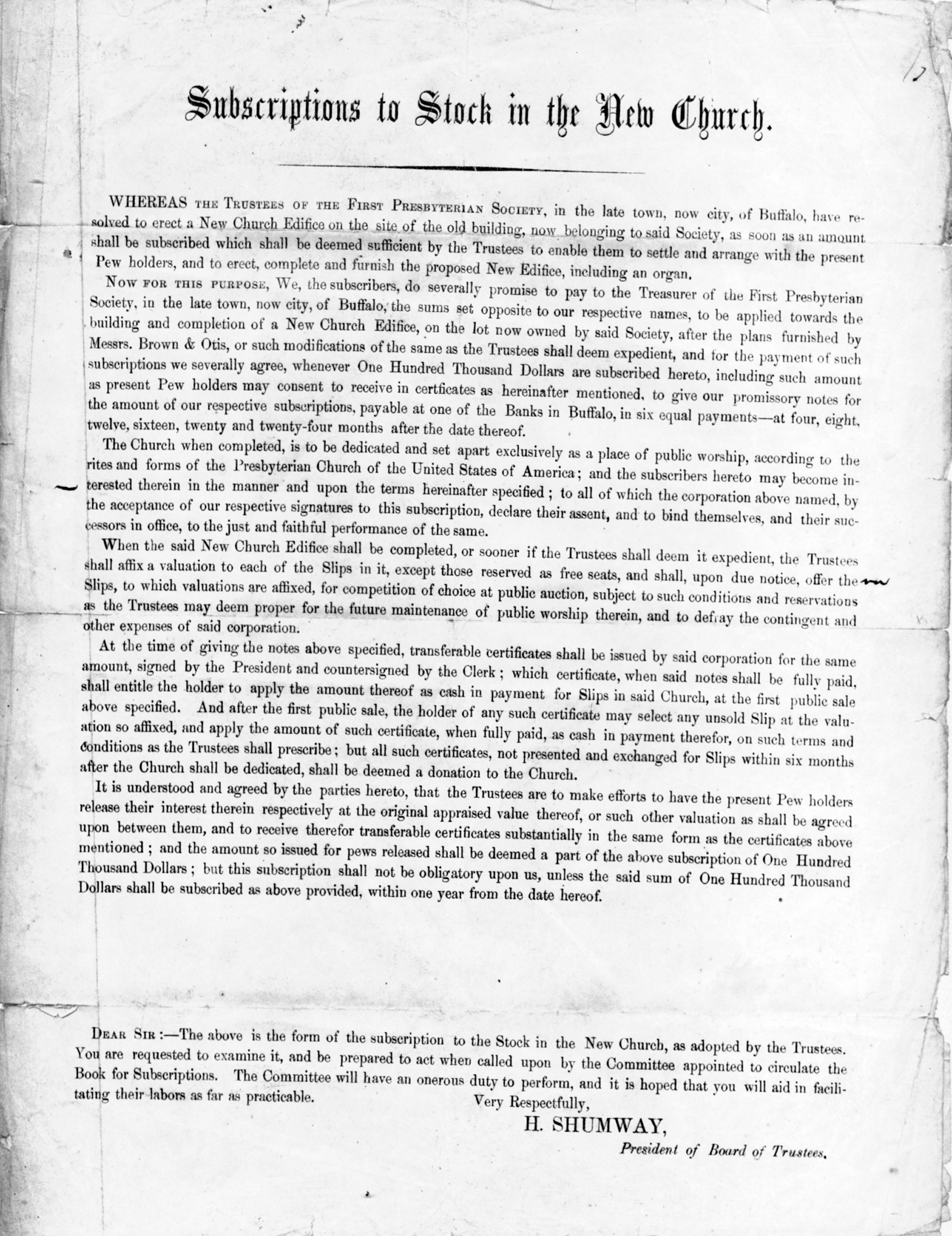
Scan of original 1853 Subscription Document

Funding was obtained through a subscription project and by January 1854 over $100,000.00 was raised, by April plans for a new building were selected and bids were advertised. However, no responsible architect or builder was found that would undertake the project, so the plan was abandoned and the funds were returned to the subscribers.

By the mid-19th century music played an increasing role in many churches and the decision was made to install an organ in the church. In the 1850s a small organ was rented from William R. Koppock, who also played the instrument during services. However, this instrument proved unsatisfactory, so the church returned to instrumental arrangements. Not until August 1860 was the only organ installed in the church. However, this was not without some controversy among the congregation, many of whom still held the puritan belief that organs were tools of the devil and had no place in a church building. Up until that time, the congregation was traditionally accompanied by a trio of musicians playing bass viol, violoncello and flute. The new organ was built by Garrett House of Buffalo, New York, at the price of $2,500 that was raised entirely by subscriptions from the members. The new organ was dedicated August 26, 1860. Mr. Sykes, the organist at Central Presbyterian Church, played for the opening anthem, "Praise the Lord" and to close the service, "Old Hundred". When in 1891 after the congregation moved to its present location, the organ was sold and the same builder relocated it to St. Stephen's (Shrine of Saint Jude) Roman Catholic Church at 193 Elk Street in 1891. This organ, the oldest Buffalo-made pipe organ extant, is still in service today. A wooden model of this organ stands in the Historical Hall near the Wadsworth Street entrance.

During the pastorate of Dr. David R. Frazer a proposal to sell the church building and to unite with Calvary Church on Delaware Avenue opposite Tracy Street was considered in 1879, but after some debate, that proposal was rejected. However, by the time that Rev. Samuel S. Mitchell, D.D. began his tenure as pastor, many members had moved from the central part of the city and had thus transferred their membership to other churches which became a cause of real concern. "Old First" Church was by now showing its age, the building, still beautiful and impressive, was now almost sixty-years-old; its many limitations and design problems were soon brought to light. It was deficient of a proper lecture room, Sunday-school room, Bible class rooms and parlors. The ventilation of the Sunday-school room was considered defective, and it was subject to dampness. The main audience room opened on Main Street and not on Church Street, which was a complaint of many in the congregation. In summer the windows had to be opened for ventilation, as the ventilator in the ceiling was inadequate, and when the windows were opened the congregation was to some extent disturbed by increasing noises from the passage of street cars, carts, beer wagons and so on. At the time of the construction, most of the church members resided near the church. However, as the city expanded, a large number of members had moved uptown, many of these families who formerly worshiped soon joined congregations closer to their homes, leaving Old First Church without proper financial support.

Dr. Mitchell wisely shared the view of his predecessor, in that the church should seek a location not so hemmed in by ever-growing businesses that had taken over the area. The trustees felt likewise; but still, many members of the congregation did not agree. The dispute was taken to Presbytery; eventually the matter was taken to court, and soon news of the discernment broke out in the newspapers. The matter was finally resolved, in favor of removal to a new location. In 1887, Mrs. Truman G. Avery who lived at the site now occupied by Kleinhans Music Hall donated a parcel of land across the circle at the corner of Wadsworth and Pennsylvania Streets in memory of her parents, Mr. and Mrs. Stephen G. Austin. The matter now settled; the days of historic "Old First" were now numbered. By April 1889 the congregation was ordered by the city to sell the property to Erie County Saving Bank and it was announced in July 1890 that the Old First Church would soon be demolished to make way for the Erie County Savings Bank's new office.

== First Presbyterian Church at Symphony Circle (1889–present) ==
In 1887, following a much publicized period of discernment and debate concerning moving the congregation away from Shelton Square, Mrs. Trueman G. Avery, a faithful member of the congregation who lived at the site now occupied by Kleinhans Music Hall, donated a parcel of land across the circle at the corner of Wadsworth and Pennsylvania Streets in memory of her parents, Mr. and Mrs. Stephen G. Austin. Thus begins the story of the present edifice, designed by the renowned architectural firm of Green & Wicks. Following a well published design competition the winning design by the architectural firm of Edward Brodhead Green & William Sidney Wicks stood out from the other three finalists, it was noted for its Romanesque exterior, Byzantine-revival styled sanctuary and tall central tower that would dominate the skyline of late 19th century Buffalo through the present day.

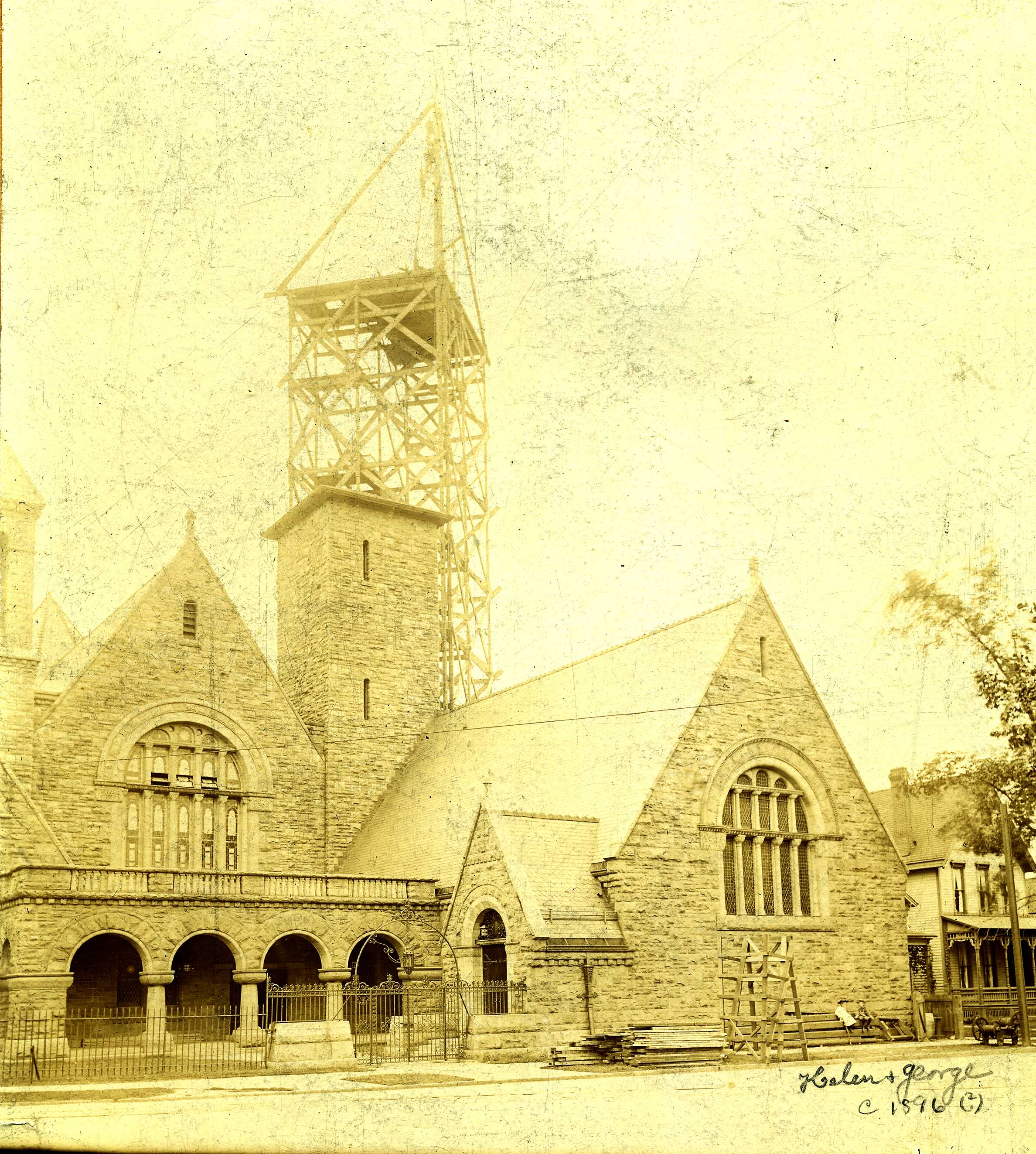
Final construction photo of the main tower of the present edifice in 1896

Ground breaking took place and the first services were held in the newly built chapel on September 11, 1889, then on December 13, 1891, the first services were held in the newly constructed sanctuary. However, the new building was not dedicated until after the completion of the tower on May 16, 1897. The dedicatory sermon that day was preached by the Rev. Francis L. Patton, D. D., President of Princeton University, which was the Alma Mater of the pastor, Dr. Samuel S. Mitchell, who would, following his retirement in 1904, return there for a year to lecture on the English Bible. It was also during this time on May 16, 1897, that construction began for Welcome Hall. The building, designed by the same architectural firm of Green & Wicks, was located at 404-408 Seneca St. as a mission of First church to the community; the lands and buildings costing about $50,000.00. With the dedication of the new edifice came Dr. Mitchell's reinstallation as pastor. That event occurred on June 24, 1897, when Dr. Mitchell was once again installed as pastor of the "New" First Church. The Rev. Henry Elliott Mott, pastor at Central Presbyterian Church, acted as moderator; the installation sermon was preached by the Rev. Samuel Van Vranken Holmes, senior pastor at Westminster Presbyterian Church; the charge to the congregation was given by the Rev. Henry Ward, pastor at East Presbyterian Church of Buffalo; the charge to the people, by the Rev. William Waith, pastor of the Lockport Presbyterian Church in Lockport, New York, and father of the church's organist, William S. Waith; the installation prayers were offered by the Rev. William Burnett Wright, D.D., pastor at the Lafayette Avenue Presbyterian Church. During the Pan-American Exhibition of 1901, Theodore Roosevelt worshiped at the First Presbyterian Church, both as vice president and following the assassination of William McKinley. Dr. Mitchell breakfasted with Theodore Roosevelt on the morning following his inauguration, and there is some evidence to support that they were on familiar terms with each other, due in part possibly to Dr. Mitchell's pastorate in Washington, D.C. from 1869 to 1878. With Dr. Mitchell's retirement in 1904 came the pastorate of Dr. Andrew Van Vranken Raymond, D.D., who came to the church in 1906 from the office of president of Union College. Dr. Raymond served first supplied the pulpit as the stated "supply pastor", but then following the death of his wife in 1907, congregation decided to extend to him a call as pastor which he decided to accept. It was during Dr, Raymond's tenure as pastor that on February 2, 1912, the church celebrated its centennial in style, with the sanctuary decorated for the occasion with ropes of green garland, touched here and there with red and white flowers and the dates 1812 and 1912 adorning either side of the chancel.

The building has undergone several modifications over the years; most noted was the rebuilding of the old Roosevelt organ in 1915 by Austin Organs, Inc., retaining most of the Roosevelt pipes, then the redecoration of the sanctuary in 1924 under direction of Mr. William Carson Francis (1879–1945), a fourth-generation member of the congregation. Redecoration began on June 9, 1924, and was completed before October 19 service. This required the sanctuary spaces to be closed from September 11 through October 12 forcing the congregation to worship nearby at the State Normal School at the corner of Jersey and 14th Streets.

A special dedication ceremony was held the following Sunday on October 19, 1924. It was during this redecorating that the memorial windows of such exquisite design and color were installed. In 1925 the cornerstone for the Parish House was laid, the new parish house was dedicated in February 1926. This was during the pastorate of Dr. George Arthur Buttrick, D.D.

On November 5, 1931, Dr. Ralph B. Hindman was installed as pastor and because of the economics of the times; the church was forced to give up the mission of Welcome Hall following the retirement of Rev. William E. McLennan, who had been the director since 1909. The building and mission was sold to the City of Buffalo where it remained in operation as a community center before being closed and torn down a few years later. In 1949 because of concerns voiced by parishioners in the main sanctuary that the noise made during the children's services was disturbing worship, the chapel was redesigned, this included reorientation of the chapel chancel, replacing the pews, enclosing the staircase to the sanctuary balcony, changing the lighting fixtures and replacing the glass windows with special dedicated stained glass windows. In 1957, the old Roosevelt organ was also replaced, this time with a new Schlicker organ that was crafted locally in Buffalo. The next major renovation of the Chapel took place in 2004 during the pastorate of the present minister Dr. Geri Lyon. This time the pews were removed, new chairs purchased, the chapel was repainted and the floor refinished.

The sanctuary was remodeled again between June–September 1957 during the tenure of Dr. Hindman's pastorate. This time a canopy was added above the pulpit, the pulpit lowered a foot, ornate carvings installed behind the chancel and a second doorway added on the right side of the chancel. Also, an extension of the existing balcony outside the Historical Hall was added to connect the Parish House with the Old Library, additional bathrooms and storage was added in this new connecting balcony area. In 1959 during Dr. Theodore G. Lilley's pastorate, the church merged with First United Presbyterian Church. With this church, which stood on the north-east corner of Summer St. and Richmond Ave. additional gifts for expansion became available; this was realized in 1968, during the pastorate of Dr. Arthur W. Mielke, D.D. The sanctuary underwent additional modifications, this time, the chancel was extended, the communion table enlarged by the same craftsmen that carved the original table, the pulpit and lectern were also redesigned, and the dividing wall in the chancel was removed to reduce congestion. The ornate, carved chancel and pulpit railings were reused around the pulpit and lectern. The effect gave parishioner a better view of the chancel, opening it up too. Also redesigned was the Youth Center in the Parish House.

The Austin Organ rebuild, installed in 1915, was now over a half century old and Squire Haskin, who was the organist & choirmaster since 1936, was a close friend with Dr. Robert Noehren, well-known concert organist, organ designer and native of Buffalo, New York. In 1969 the old Austin Organ gave its final performance and was dismantled and replaced with a customized organ of Dr. Noehren's design. This instrument when dedicated was known as the Noehren organ until 1986, following Squire Haskin's untimely murder a few days before his retirement celebration was to commence. Dr. Noehren had returned to Buffalo for that celebration and instead performed for his memorial service along with other notable guest organists. Dr. David R. Bond, who was Squire Haskin's hand-picked successor assumed his duties a few weeks earlier than was expected, and has been organist and choirmaster since that tragic event.

Following the sudden death of Dr. Mielke's first wife Hazel on April 1, 1973, funds were raised for a memorial cross to be erected in place of the Tiffany chandelier. The 5 1/2-foot-high Byzantine cross was designed and carved by Richard Lippich of Bowmansville, New York, constructed by E. M. Hager & Sons Co., of Buffalo, New York, and dedicated on Sunday, June 22, 1975. The Tiffany chandelier was then moved to the Historical Hall, where it remained until being sold in 2007 to a private party somewhere in Texas. This move required some lighting modifications in the chancel, so two banks of lights was added above and below the chancel carvings.

During the pastorate of Rev. Gilbert Horn, the first three rows of pews were removed and stored in the basement below the chapel. This was done to accommodate the Buffalo Philharmonic Orchestra that held concerts and rehearsals there on occasion. Unfortunately, those pews were stored in less than favorable condition and because of poor humidity they have been rendered useless due to dry rot. Other than some minor restorations and repainting performed by church member Timothy Hess, the sanctuary remains as you see it today.

On May 27, 2008, another historic event occurred at First Presbyterian Church when the congregation of Central Presbyterian Church and First Presbyterian Church formally merged back together after almost 173 years. Central Presbyterian Church was founded on November 14, 1835, following some liturgical differences of opinion regarding interpretation of the scripture.
