= Andrew Van Vranken Raymond =

American minister, educator and author

Andrew Van Vranken Raymond (8 August 1854 – 5 April 1918) was an American minister, educator and author; raised in the Dutch Reformed Faith in upstate New York. He was a graduate of Union College (Class of 1875), and was a pastor in the Dutch Reformed Church before becoming a Presbyterian minister. He later accepted the position as President of Union College (1894–1907). He accepted a call to the First Presbyterian Church in Buffalo, NY where he served as pastor until his death.

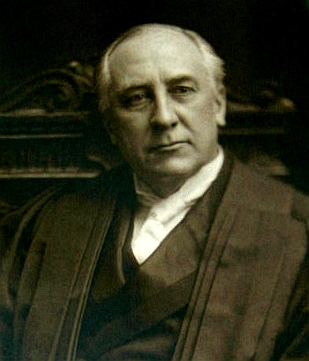

== Early life ==
Raymond was born in Visscher's Ferry (near Schenectady, New York) on 8 August 1854. He was the son of Henry A. Raymond, a minister in the Dutch Reformed faith, and Catherine Maria (Miller) Raymond, he attended Troy High School and entered Union College in 1872 as a sophomore. He played baseball, edited the College Spectator, joined the Union Navy (boating club) and was a member of the Alpha Delta Phi fraternity, graduating in 1875. He then attended New Brunswick Theological Seminary in 1878.and was ordained as a minister in 1878.

On 24 September 1879, he married Margaret Morris Thomas of Middleville, NY, who died June 11, 1907; they had two sons and a daughter.

He was pastor at the First Reformed church in Paterson, NJ from 1878 to 1881 before accepting a call that same year as pastor of Trinity Reformed Church in Plainfield, NJ from 1881 to 1887. It was at this time he left the Dutch reformed faith and became a Presbyterian minister; he accepted a call to the Fourth Presbyterian Church in Albany, New York, and was installed 10 March 1887.

== Union College ==
Raymond became much more active in college activities and soon became president of the General Alumni Association too, a post that he maintained until he resigned his pastorate. Raymond accepted the offer as College President on May 5, 1894. On 8 June 1894 he resigned from both the General Alumni Association President and as Pastor of the Fourth Presbyterian Church and began his Presidency at Union College. He remained as president of Union College in Schenectady, NY officially from 8 June 1894 until 1907. While there, he was a member of the Schenectady Chamber of Commerce and was able to restore Union College to sound financial health, and boost the science curriculum, by persuading General Electric's Charles Steinmetz to head the newly established Department of Electrical Engineering and Applied Physics. He also created a chair of history and sociology. He offered his services as supply pastor at First Presbyterian Church in Buffalo, NY during his last years as president of Union College. Raymond published his only book; “Union University, its history, influence, characteristics and equipment”. Shortly after its release, Raymond's wife died. He resigned from the presidency on July 18, 1907, after being persuaded to accept the call to First Presbyterian Church.

== Pastor ==
Raymond was installed as senior pastor at 1st Presbyterian Church on December 6, 1907, at an installation service presided by E. H. Dickinson of North Presbyterian Church; William Waith, read the scripture passages, and returning to the pulpit in the “New” First Presbyterian Church to preach the sermon was former pastor David R. Frazer, now Pastor of the First Presbyterian Church in Newark, NJ.

Raymond became active in Western New York; on 1 February 1910 he was named Manager of the Buffalo State Hospital to succeed William C. Krauss, to complete his term which was to expire December 31, 1916.

With the outbreak of World War I and the United States entry into the war in 1917, Raymond asked and received leave of absence to preach at military camps, leaving R William M. Boocock, Associate Minister in charge. However, this schedule took its toll on Raymond's health, under the strain of these duties. In January 1918 he visited Clifton Springs to better his health and in early April 1918, he died of a heart attack in Tyron (near Spartanburg, South Carolina) while visiting his son. Funeral services were held in the First Presbyterian Church on Monday, 8 April 1918.

== Publications ==
- Raymond, Andrew Van Vranken (1907). Union University. New York: Lewis Publishing Company. OCLC 11901093.

== Notes ==
Preceded by Samuel S Mitchell	First Presbyterian Church of Buffalo, NY; 1907–1918	Succeeded by George Arthur Buttrick
