= Main Place Tower =

Skyscraper in Buffalo, New York

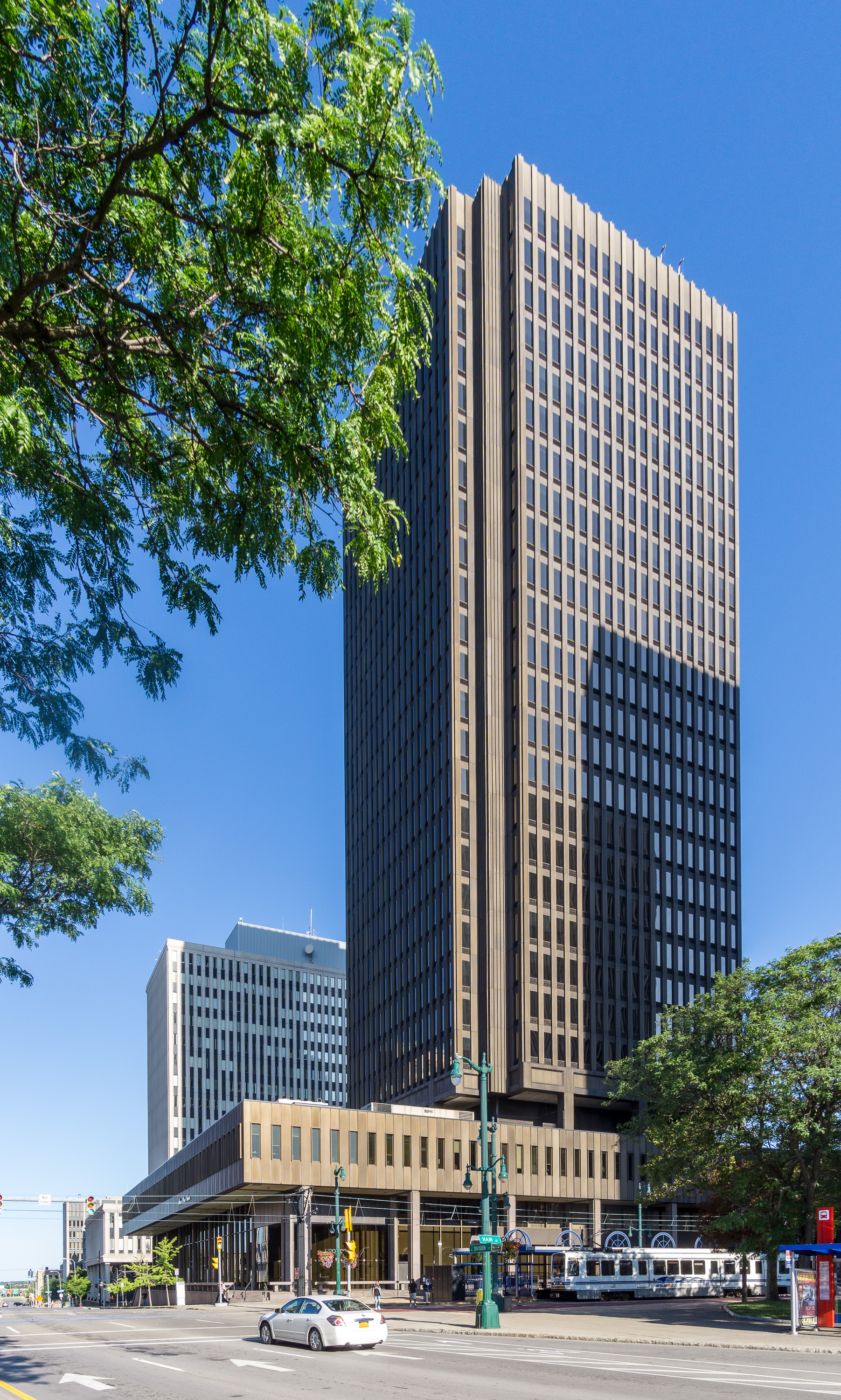
- Main Place Tower in Buffalo, New York

General information
- Status: Completed
- Type: Office
- Location: 350 Main Street, Buffalo, New York, U.S.
- Coordinates: 42.884423°N 78.875452°W
- Completed: 1969
- Owner: Main Liberty Group

Height
- Roof: 106.68 m (350.0 ft)

Technical details
- Floor count: 26
- Floor area: 341,000 sq ft (31,679.9 m^{2})

Design and construction
- Architect: Harrison & Abramovitz

The Main Place Tower is located at 350 Main Street, in Buffalo, New York. The skyscraper is the fourth-tallest building in the city, and home to many technology and communication firms. The tower, built in 1969, rises 350 feet (110 meters). The shopping center within the complex is referred to as the Main Place Mall.

== History ==
The current location of the Main Place Tower was originally Shelton Square, a city block of considerable traffic in the city. Shelton Square was the site of a notorious publicity stunt in 1955, when disc jockey Tom Clay climbed to the top of a billboard in the square and disrupted traffic by repeatedly playing "Rock Around the Clock" by Bill Haley & His Comets on a loudspeaker; the incident led to Clay's firing and arrest.

Originally the headquarters for the Erie County Savings Bank, it became known as One Empire Tower when the Erie County Savings Bank became Empire of America, the building was then renamed "Main Place Tower" in the 1980s with the demise of Empire of America. The Main Place Tower was constructed as part of an urban renewal project. The land site of the building was previously home to the Richardsonian Romanesque castle-like Erie County Savings Bank Building (1890-1968). The Erie County Savings Bank was both the anchor tenant and financial backer for the Main Place tower construction and leased the first three floors upon its completion.

Jim Kelly owned and operated Sport City Grill restaurant with the attached Network nightclub on the ground floor of the complex from 1993 to 1996. New ownership tried to relaunch the restaurant as Banana Joe's Sports Bar & Grill in late 1996, but it went out of business in 1997.

As of 2020, the concourse at the base of the complex has several tenants, two restaurants and a food court. That year, the city announced plans to collaborate with Main Place's owner to make room for office and parking space. By March 2025, Gino & Joe’s Famous NY Pizza, one of the final remaining businesses inside Main Place Mall, had closed its longtime location in the mall after more than four decades, with plans to relocate nearby.

== Gallery ==
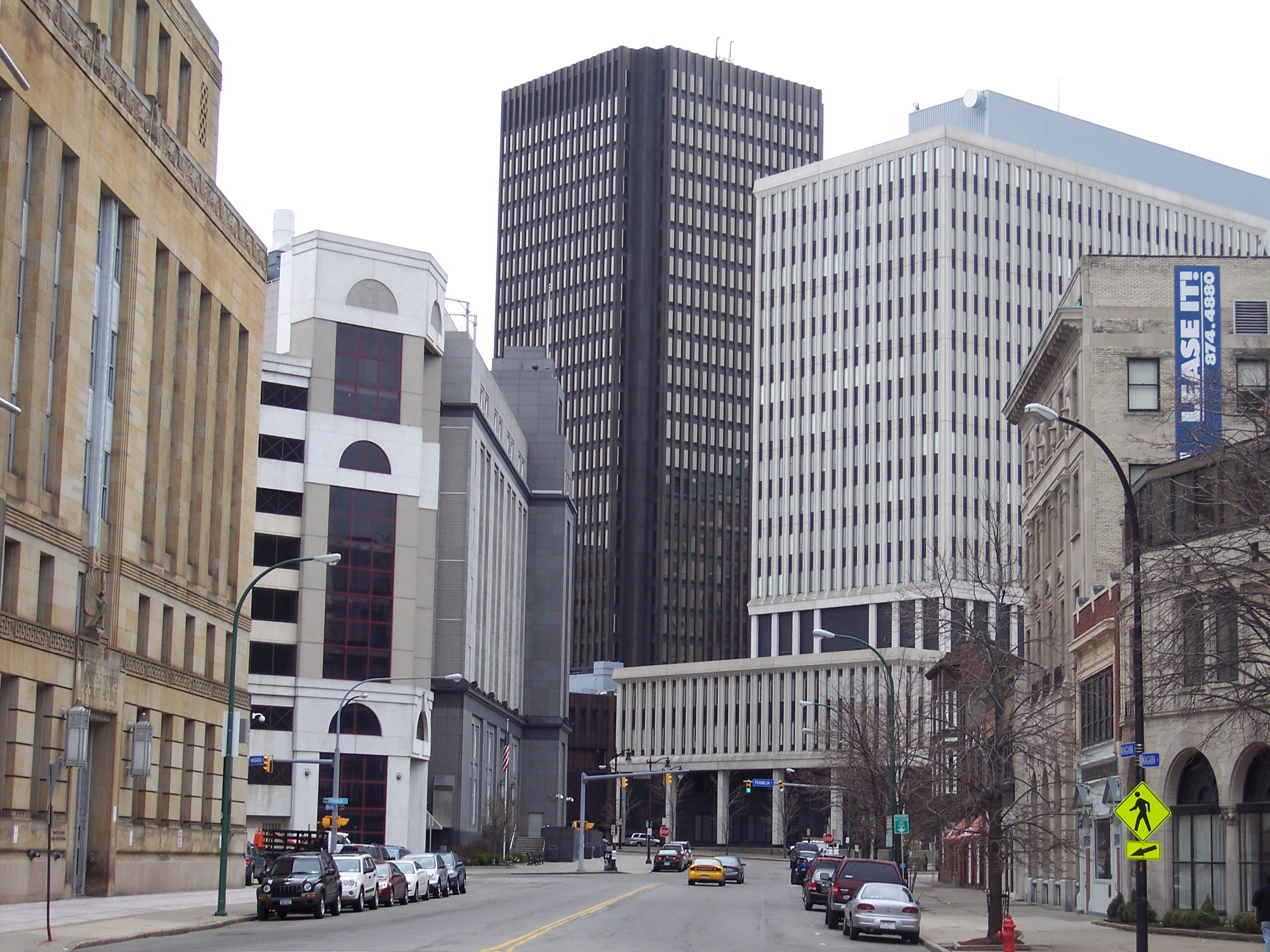
View from Niagara Square

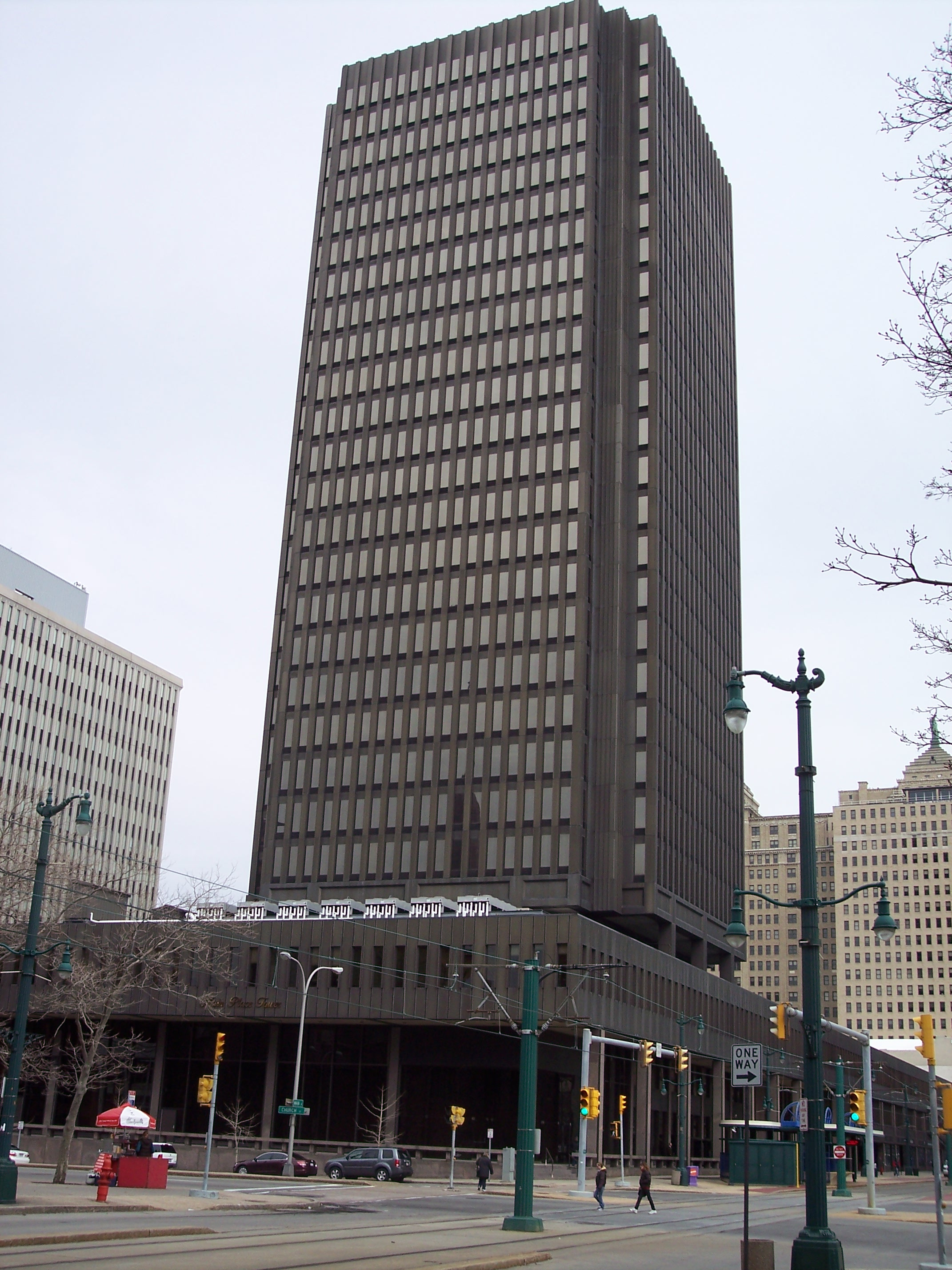

== See also ==
- List of tallest buildings in Buffalo, New York
