= The Hungering Dark =

- Author: Frederick Buechner
- Language: English
- Genre: Anthology
- Publisher: Seabury Press, NY
- Publication date: 1968
- Preceded by: The Magnificent Defeat
- Followed by: The Alphabet of Grace

The Hungering Dark is a collection of meditations on Christianity and faith by Frederick Buechner. Preceded by The Magnificent Defeat, it is the second in a series of sermon anthologies preached in 1959 during the author's time at the Phillips Exeter Academy. The Hungering Dark is Buechner's second non-fiction publication, and it was published by Seabury Press, NY, in 1968.

== Composition ==
Buechner delivered the sermons anthologised in both The Magnificent Defeat and The Hungering Dark as the ‘new school minister’ and head of Theology at the Phillips Exeter Academy. The author writes in his autobiographical work, Now and Then (1983), of the challenges of preparing and delivering sermons for a young and unreceptive audience, many of whom were present in chapel ‘against both their wills and their principles’. In a later sermon anthology, Secrets in the Dark (2006), Buechner writes that the majority of his students, ‘in keeping with the spirit of the time’, were ‘against almost everything – the Vietnam war, the government, anybody over thirty including their parents, the school, and especially religion.’ In Now and Then, the author remembers the feeling of ‘sheer terror’ he felt before preaching in front of both his students and fellow faculty members; regarding the latter, he writes that his colleagues were ‘often jaded, skeptical, sometimes even quite openly negative about the whole religious enterprise.’

Concerning the effect of regularly having to preach to such a hostile audience, Marjorie Casebier McCoy suggests that the experience forced the author to ‘hone his preaching and literary skills to their utmost in order to get a hearing for the Christian faith.’ Reflecting on his perception of the role of the preacher in such a context, Buechner draws on Friedrich Schleiermacher in suggesting that his ‘job’ was to ‘defend the Christian faith against its “cultured despisers” [...], to present the faith as appealingly, honestly, relevantly, and skillfully as I could’. The volume is dedicated ‘To my former students and colleagues at the Phillips Exeter Academy.’

== Major themes ==
As in The Magnificent Defeat, the subject of Buechner's sermons in The Hungering Dark offer meditations on a broad selection of texts from the Old and New testaments. In Now and Then, Buechner reveals the influence of Karl Barth’s essay, ‘The Need for Christian Preaching’, on both the sermons in his first two anthologies, but also on his later preaching. ‘These words of Barth’s were extremely powerful words to me’, he writes: ‘[they] seemed extremely honest and, as far as I could tell, extremely true; and in my preaching at Exeter and ever since I have been guided by them.’ Buechner critic Jeffrey Munroe writes that the sermons anthologised in The Hungering Dark develop many of the themes that would become 'trademarks' of the author's work, including faith, doubt, and the presence of God in ordinary moments and stories. Buechner scholar Dale Brown notes that the 'metaphor of darkness', which 'operates in much of Buechner's fiction, is particularly present within The Hungering Dark.

Concerning the meditations in both The Magnificent Defeat and The Hungering Dark, the author writes: ‘I have never assumed that the people I talk to are so certain it is true that the question is not still very much alive for them. […] I assume always that they want to know if it is true as much as I do myself.’
