= Secrets in the Dark =

Collection of sermons and lectures authored by Frederick Buechner

- Author: Frederick Buechner
- Language: English
- Publisher: HarperCollins
- Publication date: 2006
- Followed by: The Yellow Leaves

Secrets in the Dark: A Life in Sermons is a collection of sermons and lectures authored by Frederick Buechner. Published in 2006 by HarperCollins, Secrets in the Dark is Buechner's fifteenth non-fiction work.

== Composition ==
In his introduction to the work, Buechner refers to Secrets in the Dark as a 'culling' from his previous sermon anthologies: The Magnificent Defeat (1966), The Hungering Dark (1968), A Room Called Remember (1984), The Clown in the Belfry (1992), and The Longing for Home (1996). In addition to several sermons first published in these anthologies, Secrets in the Dark also contains a number of original works.

The collections features sermons preached while the author was chaplain at the Phillips Exeter Academy in 1959, alongside addresses given at a variety of venues, including the National Cathedral in Washington DC, Westminster Abbey, Princeton University Chapel, Mercersburg Academy, and the New York Public Library.

== Themes ==
Buechner scholar Jeffrey Munroe suggests that many of the sermons featured in Secrets in the Dark are apologetic in nature: 'This is how Buechner does apologetics', he writes, 'not drawing on reason or proof but experience.' The critic further remarks that Buechner's apologetic style in Secrets in the Dark acknowledges what is 'preposterous and unbelievable' in the Biblical narrative, while also insisting that it 'has to be true'.

Dale Brown locates the source for Buechner's preoccupations in Secrets in the Dark in Karl Barth's question, "Is It True?". Brown suggests that the author 'thinks about Barth's question with every sermon' featured in the anthology. This space for doubt is further noted by Munroe, who argues that, in Secrets in the Dark, 'Buechner anticipates doubt and recognises it as a normal part of faith'. Munroe also finds the significance of personal experience to be a central theme within the collection, writing that the author 'drawns on his experience and invites us through his words into deep and powerful mysteries'. Brown roots Buechner's concern with personal experience in Secrets in the Dark in the work of theologians such as James Muilenberg and Paul Tillich; the critic writes that the 'airing of secrets', which he argues is promissory to the anthology, is presented as a means of access to 'hope and healing'.
