= The Wizard's Tide =

1990 novella by Frederick Buechner

- Author: Frederick Buechner
- Language: English
- Publisher: HarperCollins
- Publication date: 1990
- Preceded by: Brendan
- Followed by: The Son of Laughter

The Wizard's Tide: a story is a novella by the American author and theologian, Frederick Buechner. It was first published in 1990 by Harper and Row, before being re-issued in 2005 under the altered title, The Christmas Tide.

== Plot summary ==
The Wizard's Tide narrates a year in the life of an eleven-year-old boy, Teddy Schroeder, and his family's attempt to survive the Great Depression. Teddy's father, a spendthrift who has been beset by failure in business, loses his job at the outset of the story, auguring the end of the lifestyle to which the family have been accustomed.

As their lives continue to unravel, the Schroeders move aimlessly between their home in New Jersey and their summerhouse in Long Island. As the news of the abdication crisis becomes a topic of international conversation and the children play newly invented board game, Monopoly, Mr. Schroeder becomes increasingly dependent upon alcohol, which leads to a gradual breakdown in his marriage. Both Teddy and his younger sister, Bean, overhear late-night arguments, with their mother on one occasion asking her son to hide the car keys in bed with him, only to have Mr. Schroeder enter the room, drunk, and beg for their return.

Having had an investment in a glass company fail, which he has funded both through borrowing and through the illicit sale of Mrs. Schroeder's stocks, Mr. Schroeder takes his own life in the New York City Subway, leaving his gold watch under Teddy's pillow. The grieving family leave New Jersey, and return to live with Teddy's maternal grandmother, Dan, in Pittsburgh, where they prepare to celebrate Christmas together without their father, and in the midst of growing financial uncertainty.

== Composition ==
In his literary critical study, Reading Buechner, Jeffrey Munroe argues that '[b]ecause The Wizard's Tide is a fictionalised version of events during Buechner's childhood, a strong argument can be made that is should be classified as a memoir instead of a novel.' Munroe points out that the characters in the story are simple replacements of the author and his relatives: 'Teddy' is Frederick; 'Bean' is his younger brother, Jamie; his mother and father are 'Mr. and Mrs. Schroeder'; 'Grandma Schroeder' is Grandma Buechner; and 'Dan' is his maternal grandmother, Naya.

Buechner scholar Dale Brown suggests that the label 'novel' is 'a problematic classification' since the work is 'directly autobiographical', and argues that it should be 'located' with his other memoirs, listingThe Wizard's Tide alongside The Sacred Journey (1982) (elsewhere Brown calls it 'the first chapter of The Sacred Journey revisited from a new angle' and with 'withheld parts [...] included'), Now and Then (1983), Telling Secrets (1991), The Longing for Home (1996), and The Eyes of the Heart (1999). Noting that the author began composing The Wizard's Tide in the months following his mother's death in 1988, Brown writes that it 'should be read as an important moment in Buechner's self-analysis'.

Brown also notes within the work the influence of Mark Twain, while the Kirkus reviewer suggests that the narrative 'faintly echo[es]' the style of J. D. Salinger.

== Themes ==
As a heavily autobiographical work, The Wizard's Tide contains many of the themes that are common to Buechner's publications both fiction and non-fiction. Dale Brown notes that the novella typifies the author's fascination with 'shame, guilt, memory, and forgiveness'. The Wizard's Tide is also concerned with fatherlessness, single motherhood, family dysfunction, and suicide, a theme to which Buechner returned 'on many occasions'.

Buechner's discussion of these subjects in a work intended for young adults caused it to be initially rejected by 'two' publishing companies, who felt that such 'adult themes' were unsuitable for the target audience.
