= Erie County Savings Bank =

Building in Buffalo, New York (1893–1968)

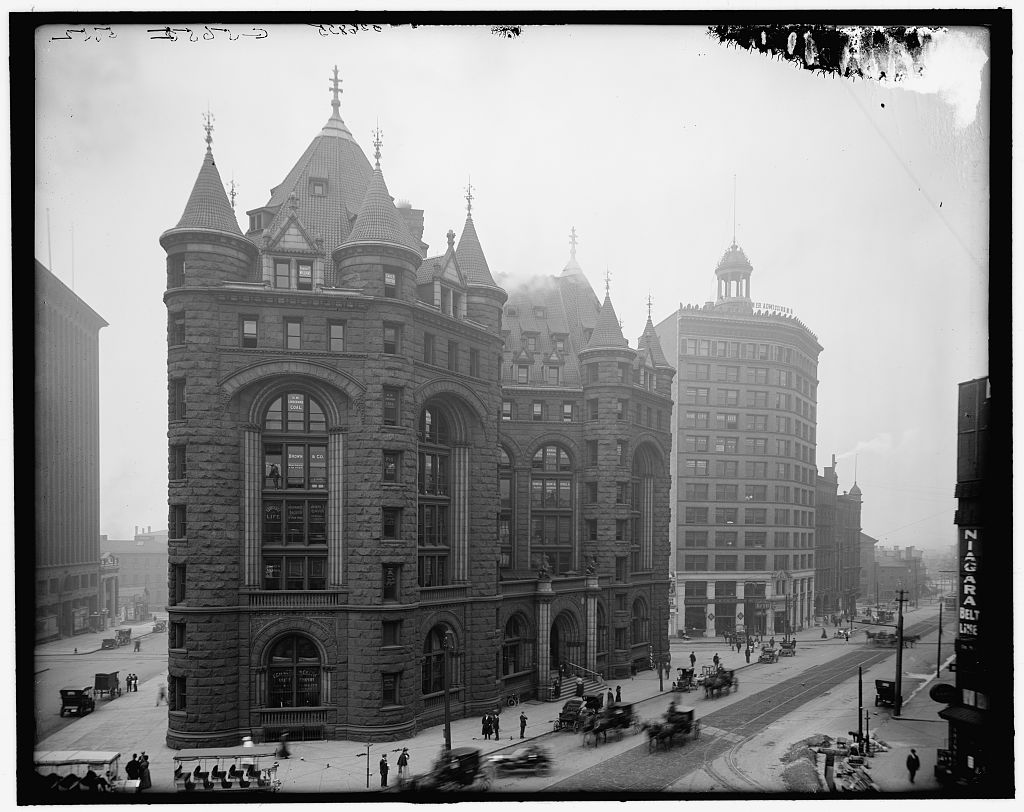
- Erie County Savings Bank (foreground)

General information
- Status: Destroyed
- Type: Office
- Architectural style: Richardsonian Romanesque
- Location: 9 Church Street, Buffalo, New York, United States
- Coordinates: 42.883633°N 78.875459°W
- Construction started: September 11, 1890
- Completed: June 1893
- Renovated: 1932
- Demolished: 1968
- Cost: 1 million US$($35.8 million in 2025 dollars)

Height
- Roof: 127 feet (38.7 m)

Technical details
- Floor count: 10
- Lifts/elevators: 4

Design and construction
- Architect: George B. Post

The Erie County Savings Bank building was a 10-story Romanesque Revival, office and bank branch building that was located at present-day 9 Church Street in downtown Buffalo, New York.

== Building history ==
The decorative castle-like building was completed in 1893 to serve as the headquarters of the Erie County Savings Bank. The building was the work of architect George B. Post who also designed the Buffalo Statler Towers. Built of pink granite from Jonesboro, Maine, the ashlar masonry walls were backed with brick. Although the exterior walls were load-bearing, the building had an interior steel framing system. The triangular-shaped building was approximately 147 feet by 157 feet (45 × 48 m), and rose to nine stories high on the Main Street side; ten stories high on the Pearl Street side. The building was constructed on a lot within Shelton Square in which the "Old" First Presbyterian Church stood. The church was destroyed in 1890, the same year construction of the savings bank began.

During the building's construction Thomas A. Edison served as the consulting engineer in charge of electrical installation.

The building was demolished in 1968 together with a number of adjacent buildings as part of an urban renewal project and replaced by the Main Place Tower. The Lion statues that were located atop the building's main entrance pillars along with granite architectural remnants were saved and are now located on the Buffalo State College campus.

=== Building site timeline ===
- (1827–1890) "Old" First Presbyterian Church
- (1893–1968) Erie County Savings Bank
- (1969–Current) Main Place Tower

== Bank history ==
- Erie County Savings Bank was known as "The Big E" in advertising campaigns.(late 1960s – 1980s)
- The bank changed its name to the Erie Savings Bank (1977–1981).
- The bank's name changed to Empire of America (1982–1990).
- In 1992, M&T Bank and KeyBank acquired its remaining deposits and the bank was dissolved.

== Gallery ==
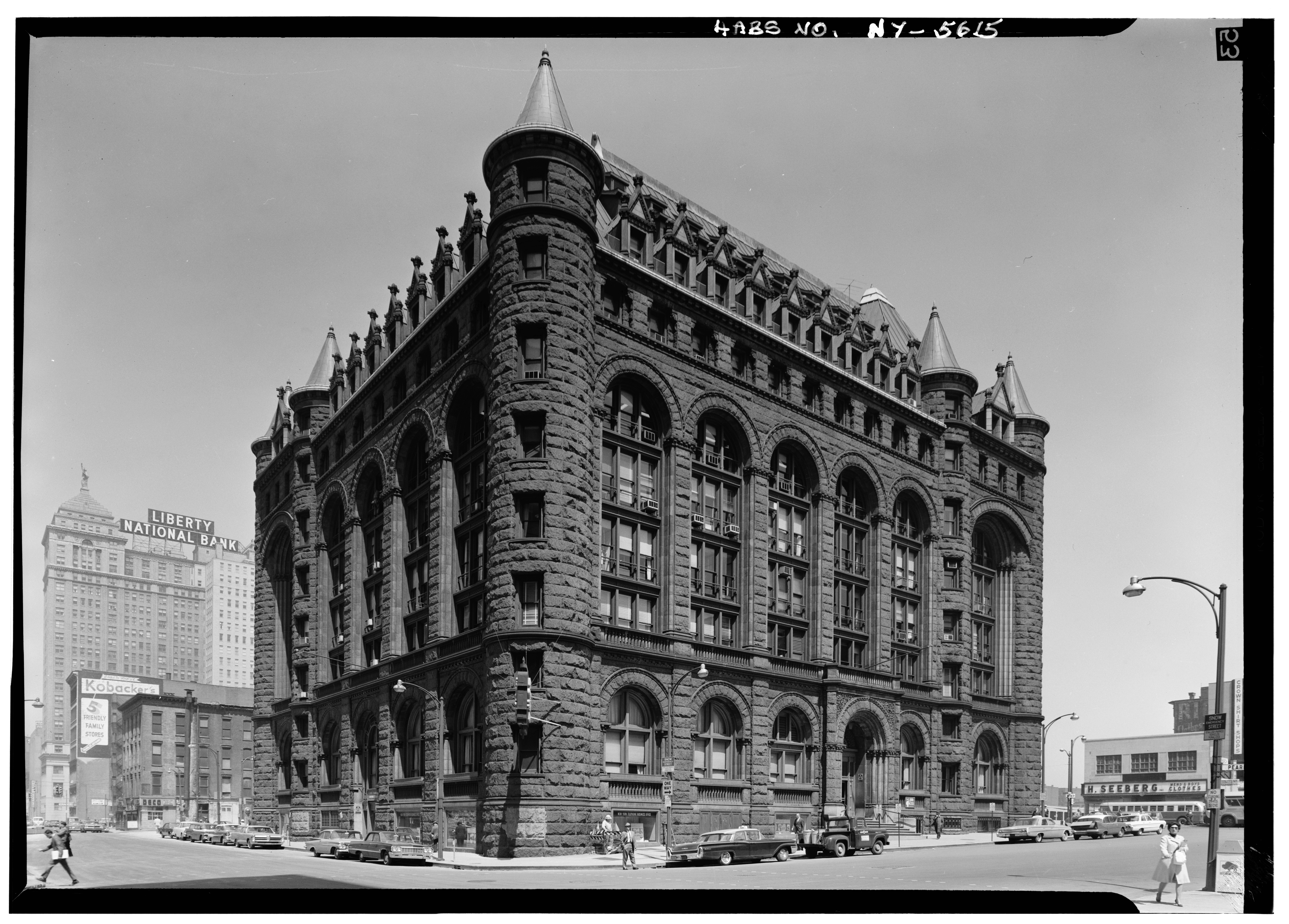
1965 photo from Southwest view

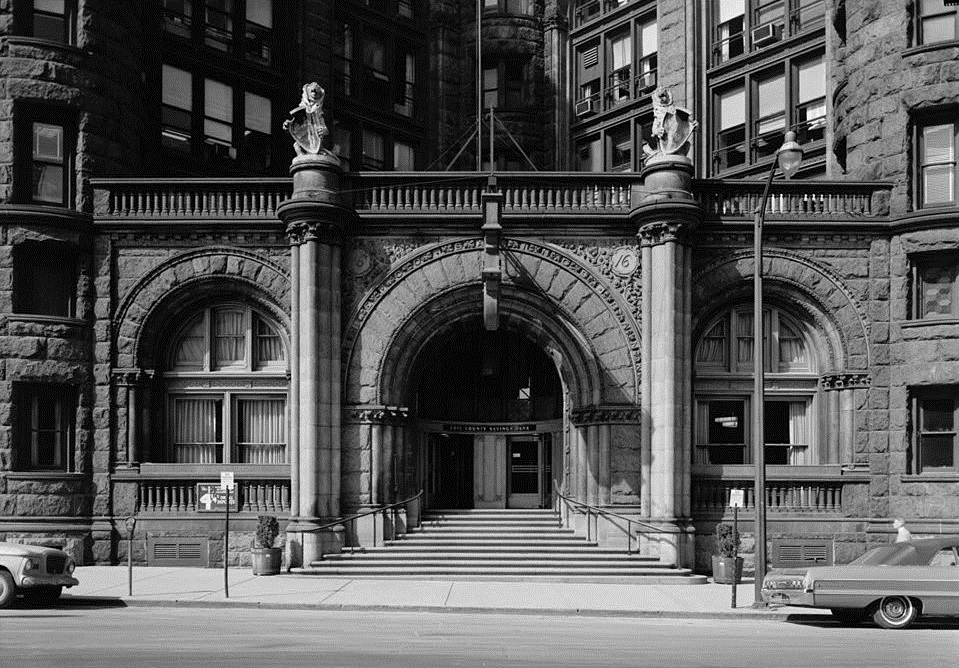
Main entrance from Northeast
