= The Seasons' Difference =

1952 novel by Frederick Buechner

- Author: Frederick Buechner
- Language: English
- Published: New York: Alfred A. Knopf
- Publication date: 1952
- Preceded by: A Long Day's Dying
- Followed by: The Return of Ansel Gibbs

The Seasons’ Difference is the second novel of American author and theologian, Frederick Buechner. It was published in 1952 by Alfred A. Knopf.

== Plot ==
The rarefied, bucolic lives of Sam and Sarah Dunn are disturbed by the uncanny pronouncements of their cousin, Peter Cowley. Sara, a sophisticated sculptress, and the languorous Samuel, whose wealth and lifestyle have driven him to a state of perpetual ennui, are caught off-guard by their young relative's report of an ecstatic, mystical vision. Cowley, who has been invited to run a small vacation school for children in the spacious grounds of their substantial summer home, claims to have experienced the vision on a hillside nearby. His pronouncement is the cause of much discussion and consternation among the adults present: Julie McMoon, a neighbour of the Dunns who is grieving the recent suicide of her husband, and whose children are attending the summer school; the cynical pianist, Richard Lundrigan, who will spend much of the novel attempting to convince Cowley that his vision was a fantasy; and Thomas Lavender, a highly enthusiastic, if not slightly crazed, minister, who has joined the vacation in his capacity as Cowley's spiritual director, and is convinced of the veracity of his protégé's mystical experience.

Also party to Cowley's mysterious claims are his students, Ellie Sonntag, Daisy and Timmy McMoon, George Bundle, Fendall Dunn, Rufus Este, and Harry Fogg. The two oldest of the children, Harry and Rufus, separate themselves from both the adults and their classmates by designating themselves as ‘the Uglies’, a nickname representative of their adolescent sense of discomfort and lack of belonging. This angst is further expressed through their close observation and discussion of those around them, their overt demonstrations of their own intelligence in Cowley's classroom, and their composition of poetry. When Cowley takes the children to a local carnival and they pile into a tent to watch a ‘freak show’ the Uglies laugh at, but also feel a deep sense of kinship with, the performers. The excursion ends awkwardly when a dwarf interrupts the performance to challenge the attitude of one of the children, who immediately begins to cry.

Convinced of the significance of his vision, both for himself and for the rest of the adults at the house, Cowley encourages them to return with him to the hillside in the hope that the phenomena will repeat itself. Upon arriving at the spot, the group are momentarily caught unawares by the appearance of a shimmering angelic assembly. The vision, however, is revealed to be the children, who, on overhearing that the adults intend to seek the miraculous, have decided to play a trick on them, enlisting the help of Sara's model, Mollie Purdue, and dressing themselves in white sheets. Lavender is convinced that the children are endowed with a purity and joy that the adults have foolishly exchanged for a cynical and narrow view of the world. At the close of the novel the ageing minister's desire to partake of that innocence manifests itself in ways both strange and tragic, first in his performance of a bizarre marriage ceremony, wedding the children to one another, and then in his fatal fall from their tree house.

== Characters ==
- Peter Cowley: a relative of the Dunn family, Cowley is a saint-like, though also somewhat comic figure, who shares the innocence of the children he is employed to tutor. Dale Brown comments that Cowley is ‘vulnerable to life in a fragile, frightening way’, positing him as somewhere between a ‘saint’ and a ‘madman’.
- Samuel Dunn: Seventeenth and eighteenth-century literature and art are the main pastime for the listless and apathetic Samuel, whose wealth and privilege have rendered him irredeemably passive – so much so that, at the climax of the novel, he falls asleep.
- Sara Dunn: A talented sculptor, Sarah is likewise effected by the ennui brought by wealth and status, though, unlike her husband, she is not reduced to passivity. Rather, she engages passionately both in the discussion around Cowley's vision and in her work.
- Julie McMoon: A wealthy neighbour of the Dunn family, Julie is labouring under the grief of her husband's suicide, the effects of which have left such a severe impact that she is often timid and passive throughout. She refuses to join Cowley on the hillside, in his attempt to recreate his vision, for fear both that it might repeat itself and that it might not.
- Richard Lundrigan: Cynical, combative, and often sardonic, Lundrigan provides the foil for Cowley, persistently and loudly making his doubts regarding the tutor's vision known. Brown calls him a ‘representative of realism’, who ‘lives on within the walls of his own limitations, acting only upon what he can see and touch’.
- Thomas Lavender: An ageing, ‘God-haunted lunatic of a minister’, Lavender is the antithesis of Lundrigan. Spiritual adviser to Cowley, Lavender is convinced of the truth of his ward's vision, and of what it demands: a recapturing of the innocence and moral purity of the children.
- Rufus Este: red-haired, bespectacled, ‘short and a little fat’, Rufus is a clever fourteen-year-old boy. Both he and Harry like to compose poetry, and their friendship leads them to form an inclusive group, ‘the Uglies’, through which the two boys can express their adolescent sense of loneliness. Brown suggests that they are ‘characters in transition’, who ‘illustrate the gradual loss of spontaneous joyfulness and wondrous expectation.’
- Harry Fogg: a tall boy with ‘dark hair and some pimples’, is similarly intelligent, and, like Rufus Este, struggling to come to terms with his growing sense of estrangement in the world. Upon seeing Mollie Purdue posing nude for Sara Dunn, Rufus experiences his first ever infatuation, falling painfully and awkwardly in love with her.
- The other children: Timmy and Daisy McMoon are the young children of the bereaved Julie McMoon, and they are joined at the summer school by Ellie Sonntag, a conscientious and calm member of the group, often seen with her thick spectacles in hand. George Bundle is the first child we meet in the novel. Often preferring his own company to that of the other children, George listens intently to a conversation between Sara and Samuel Dunn regarding Cowley's vision while fishing in the pond. The only child of Samuel and Sara Dunn, Fendall Dunn is ‘plump’, ‘dark’ in complexion, and twelve years old.
- Mollie Purdue: a beautiful model for Sara's sculpting projects, Mollie journeys to the house from her home in ‘the city’. In her early twenties, she is endowed with the ‘certain power of being observed’, and, indeed, it is by observing her that Harry falls helplessly in love with her.

== Composition ==
Following the publication of The Season’s Difference Buechner moved to New York City, there to pursue a career as a full-time writer. The young author began the composition of his second novel, however, while residing in New Jersey, where he had returned to teach English at his alma mater, Lawrenceville School. The majority of the manuscript, however, was composed while Buechner was on leave from Lawrenceville in Europe, ‘mostly in England’.

== Themes ==
Like Buechner's first novel, A Long Day’s Dying, his second is commonly considered to be broadly modernist in its style. The theme of suicide, present in A Long Day’s Dying, is also in view here through the grief of Julie McMoon. Similar also is the focus of The Seasons’ Difference around the wearied sophistication of the leisure classes – a common modernist trope. Into this modernism, however, Buechner weaves pastoral themes, included in which is the depiction of nature as a mysterious, liminal space. Death, innocence, and the attempt to recapture youth are also central to the novel, as are the theological questions that would become so vital to Buechner's later work. Indeed, critic Dale Brown writes that the novel posits the question, ‘what are sophisticated folk to do with this claim of miracle?’ Brown adds, however, that ‘the action of this novel as, as it was in A Long Day’s Dying, interior – inside the minds of the various characters, even the cloudy and tentative minds of the children.’

== Critical reception ==
Though often cited as Buechner's least-fated novel, The Seasons' Difference received a significant amount of praise from a variety of literary critics. Following its publication, the novel drew the following comment from Caspar Weinberger (later, in an article written for the San Francisco Chronicle: ‘It is not too much to say that among America’s current novelists his abilities are the most obvious and his ultimate place is with the best we have produced’. A review in Punch, written by Francis Bickley, labelled the work ‘a brilliant book’, while Tangye Lean wrote in The Spectator that it was ‘one of the most distinguished novels that has recently come out of America’. In his review written for the New Statesman, J.D. Scott wrote favourably of Buechner's portrayal of the children in The Seasons’ Difference, concluding that it was ‘true and touching’.
