= Walter J. Muilenburg =

American writer (1893–1958)

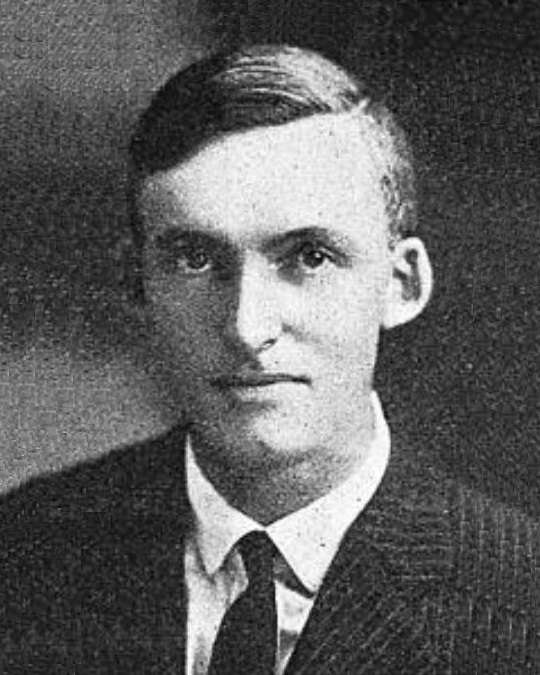
- Portrait of Muilenburg, c. 1925
- Born: Walter John Muilenburg; August 1893; Orange City, Iowa, U.S.
- Died: November 30, 1958 (aged 65); Phoenix, Arizona, U.S.
- Occupation: Writer; educator
- Education: University of Iowa (BA)
- Relatives: James Muilenburg (brother)

Walter John Muilenburg (August 1893 – November 30, 1958) was an American writer and educator. He wrote short stories and one novel, titled Prairie. His short stories have been included in the Best Short Stories of 1915 and 1916.

== Personal life ==
Muilenburg was born to John and Gertrude (Van Rooyan) Muilenburg near Orange City, Iowa, in August 1893. Prior to his birth, the Muilenburg family lived in the area for 20 years. It is likely that Muilenburg's family was not wealthy because of how much land they worked on. Muilenburg and his siblings received high school diplomas at a time when farm children in Siouxland normally only attended school up to the eighth grade, and they all attended college. He attended the University of Iowa and his brother James Muilenburg attended Yale University. Muilenburg graduated from the University of Iowa in 1915. He met his friend John T. Frederick while in college. He owned a farm close to Glennie, Michigan.

== Career ==
Muilenburg composed short stories with Percival Hunt, and two of those stories were published in The Midland's first volume. After graduating from college, Muilenburg worked for newspapers and taught at the high school he previously attended and in Michigan. He worked at the University of Iowa as an English professor, and he later became an associate professor of English at Michigan State College. His short stories have been included in the Best Short Stories of 1915 and 1916, and some of his stories have received translations. His novel Prairie was published in 1925 by Viking Press. It was said in the 1928 publication Midland Schools: Official Organ of the Iowa State Education Association, Volumes 42 that he was working on a second novel and that readers were looking forward to it, although it was never finished. Muilenburg's novel Prairie was so well received by Edward Joseph Harrington O'Brien that he considered "the fiction in The Midland to be more vital and significant than that appearing in any other magazine." Prairie is based on Muilenburg's earlier short story with the same title. His story At the End of the Road was translated into Spanish.

== Death ==
Muilenburg had lung cancer for three years prior to his death. He died from a heart attack on November 30, 1958, at age 65 in Phoenix, Arizona during his winter stay.
