= A Long Day's Dying =

1950 novel by Frederick Buechner

- Author: Frederick Buechner
- Language: English
- Published: New York: Alfred A. Knopf
- Publication date: 1950
- ISBN: 978-0972429542
- Followed by: The Seasons' Difference

A Long Day's Dying is the debut novel of the American author and theologian, Frederick Buechner. Published in 1950 with Alfred A. Knopf, the novel was received with critical acclaim.

== Plot summary ==
A Long Day's Dying revolves around the lives of seven characters—at their center, Tristram Bone: a wealthy, middle-aged, and enormously corpulent bachelor in possession of a pet monkey and attended by his elderly German housekeeper, Emma. At the outset of the novel Bone makes a visit to the Cloisters of the Metropolitan Museum of Art, where he is joined by his friends, Elizabeth Poor and George Motley. Bone almost summons up the courage to confess to Elizabeth his feelings for her, but he fails. A middle-aged widow, Elizabeth's carefree nature renders her prone to moments of extreme apathy and ennui, tendencies that leave Bone unsure of her perception of him. Bone's embarrassing incident in one of the chapels is secretly observed by Motley, whose propensity to gossip leads him to undermine Bone by mockingly relaying the incident to Elizabeth. She appears unmoved, and Motley is made nervous by her refusal to enter into his chatter.

In an attempt to deepen his friendship with Elizabeth, Motley proposes that she travel with him the following day to an unnamed university—likely Buechner's alma mater, Princeton—where he is due to deliver a lecture. Seeing an opportunity to visit her son, Leander, who is a student there, Elizabeth accompanies him on the journey. When they arrive, Leander introduces his mother and Motley to a friend of his, Paul Steitler, a lecturer in English literature at the university. When Elizabeth spends the night with Steitler, Motley sees an opportunity to strengthen his relationship with Bone, following his faux pas at the Cloisters, and so he rushes to relay the details of the love affair back to him. This news brings with it the revelation, for Bone, that his love for Elizabeth is unrequited. When he gently confronts Elizabeth on her return, however, she denies the story, and wildly claims that Steitler is engaging in an illicit relationship with her son. Bone writes to Steitler with a request to meet him at the Cloisters, and, following a conversation with the young lecturer, he realises that the story told by Elizabeth was a lie.

Fearing that Bone will find out about her lie, Elizabeth becomes unwell and complains to her elderly mother, Maroo. Maroo journeys into the city to care for her daughter, and, while on the train, is taken ill. Though she had planned to dine with Bone to discuss Elizabeth's breakdown, Maroo's illness prevents her from making the journey to his house. Left with a beautifully laid table, an already prepared meal, and no companion to enjoy it with, Bone asks his housekeeper, Emma, to sit and eat with him and his pet monkey, Simon. After the dinner, which proves to be a difficult experience for Emma—who is neither dressed for the occasion nor comfortable with the prospect of eating with her employer—Bone withdraws to his chambers with the monkey. Upon finding an old, ornate shaving razor, Bone playfully draws the flat edge of the blade across his throat. In an attempt to mimic him, the monkey steals the razor, and accidentally slits its own throat. The following day all of the characters—apart from Emma the housekeeper and the now deceased Simon—gather at Elizabeth's house, and sit by Maroo's bedside when, at the close of the novel, she passes away.

== Characters ==
- Tristram Bone: a middle-aged and wealthy bachelor with considerable girth, Bone is an introspective character with a gentle disposition that is informed by both his social intelligence and his inclination to view others generously. Shy and retiring, Bone is unable to openly confess his love for Elizabeth.
- Elizabeth Poor: a middle-aged and wealthy widow, Elizabeth is a paragon of early twentieth century decadence. Though aware of Bone's love for her, Elizabeth appears disinterested by any considerations that might extend beyond the temporary, and is unable to move beyond her languorous enjoyment of the present.
- George Motley: a diminutive novelist, also approaching middle age as denoted by his thinning red hair. Like many of the other characters, Motley is highly introspective, often questioning the virtue of his own motives, especially when discussing or disclosing the private matters of others in conversation. His tendency to continue, despite both his revealed misgivings and general uncertainty regarding his own motives, renders him a somewhat sinister, albeit complex, character.
- Paul Steitler: a lecturer at the university, Steitler is likewise unable to discern his own motives throughout the novel, though he outwardly presents himself as a ‘professional corrupter of the young’. Following his affair with Elizabeth, Steitler realises that he is actually in love with her son, Leander, despite being innocent of her accusation that he is engaging in an illicit relationship with him.
- Emma Plaut: a middle-aged German housekeeper, described as ‘a servant in the old manner’. In addition to her duties, Emma is chiefly concerned with gathering personal information about the life of her employer, either by listening through closed doors, checking the pockets of his clothing, or attempting to elicit details from his conversation.
- Leander Poor: a good-looking, young college student, endowed with a certain social naivety. To the end of the novel he is apparently unaware of what has transpired between any of the other characters, and is thus held by Bone to be in possession of a rare quality of innocence.
- Maroo: a wise and aging woman, whose beautifully written letters to her grandson go un-replied, and whose journey to the city in response to her daughter's distressed communiqués leads to a bout of ‘high fever’, and ultimately her death.

== Composition ==
Buechner has meditated at length in several of his autobiographical works on the origins of his first novel, which was published when he was 23. In his fourth and final memoir, titled The Eyes of the Heart (1999), he reflects on his friendship with the poet, James Merrill, and the summer that they spent together during which the novel was finished. Having graduated late from Princeton due to an 'undistinguished hitch in the army', in 1948 Buechner turned down a position at the Hun School in Princeton to spend the summer writing with Merrill, in a cottage on Georgetown Island off the coast of Bath, Maine. Concerning the writing process, the author remembers:

We wrote in the morning, Jimmy in one room and I in another, to the constant accompaniment of old 78-rpm records, which we took turns loading onto the portable phonograph--Stravinsky's Petrouchka, Mozart's violin and harpsichord sonatas adapted by Vronsky and Babin, if I have their names right after all these years, Satie's Gymnopedies, and the Lieutenant Kije suite of Prokofiev, to name only the few.

== Themes ==
Maroo's pronouncement over the characters from her deathbed, that ‘everything will now be different’, gestures powerfully to the themes that run through the novel. Dense with atmosphere and peopled with richly complex characters, Buechner's first novel emerges from the modernist tradition. It is an intricate and elegantly written tale in which, in the words of critic Dale Brown, there are ‘no moral dictates, no decisive understanding between people, only a blind, dimly motivated action, producing consequences that follow like the falling of randomly arranged dominoes’. In his thematic summary of the novel, Brown writes: ‘One could argue that Buechner writes his first novel with an outline of the tenets of literary modernism tacked on the wall above the typewriter’. These tenets, he writes, include ‘an emphasis on interior consciousness, a recognition of the alienation of human beings from one another, and the positioning of incompleteness as the common lot of humanity’. As such, the characters suffer from the effects of individualism, leading to listlessness, ennui, and an inability to communicate. To these themes, Brown adds ‘such emphatically modern preoccupations as’:

[T]he carelessness of the upper class, the problem of trying to get beyond the limitations of one's own consciousness, the inevitable doom that hangs over our every attempt at connection with others, and the devastation wrought by the manipulations of one character in the life of another.

== Critical reception ==
From its initial publication A Long Day’s Dying attracted a significant amount of critical attention, from both notable literary critics and authors, to literary journals and periodicals.

The acclaimed English novelist, Malcolm Lowry, declared that A Long Day's Dying was ‘executed with almost flawless taste, and technically, a high degree of excellence’. ‘Mr Buechner’, he continued, ‘has the type of mind from which various things are liable to appear fully blown and more or less perfect in their own right’. Christopher Isherwood, himself a novelist and close friend of W. H. Auden, commented that:

Mr. Buechner is a young novelist of talent and great promise, with a subtle gift for creating unusual but solid characters and an atmosphere of excitement which is not dependent on physical violence. This is a really outstanding first novel.

Perhaps the first to identify A Long Day’s Dying with the American literary tradition of the fin de siècle, novelist John Horne Burns remarked that:

Frederick Buechner's A Long Day's Dying is a novel of sheer magic. The richness of the prose, the delicacy in handling situations belong to a more refined era of American fiction. I think the book will be read by anyone curious as to what a wonderful novel can and does do.

Carl Van Vechten, widely recognised as a patron of the Harlem Renaissance and also for his work as the literary executor of Gertrude Stein, stated himself ‘a great admirer of Frederick Buechner's A Long Day's Dying’, while also noting its impressiveness as a debut: ‘It is the book of a first novelist already arrived, most original, and filled with wit, nostalgia, and emotion.’ The renowned composer, conductor, and author, Leonard Bernstein, also eulogised the novel, remarking:

I have rarely been so moved by a perception. Mr. Buechner shows a remarkable insight into one of the least easily expressible tragedies of modern man; the basic incapacity of persons really to communicate with one another. That he has made this frustration manifest, in such a personal and magnetic way, and at the age of twenty-three, constitutes a literary triumph.

Newsweek heralded Buechner's debut work as ‘one of the best and most unusual of recent novels’, while the Saturday Review of Literature found it to be ‘written with remarkable virtuosity’. Writing for the New York Times Book Review, critic David Daiches judged that, ‘There is a quality of civilized perception here, a sensitive and plastic handling of English prose and an ability to penetrate to the evanescent core of a human situation, all proclaiming major talent.’

Other reviews were similarly laudatory. Isabel Bolton concludes her review of A Long Day's Dying by writing that: ‘This is an authentic work of art. Mr Buechner has written a remarkable book. For the first novel of so young a man his achievement seems to me amazing. I feel sure its publications will be an important literary event.’ Noting the uniqueness of Buechner's style, Pearl Kazin commented that the author is endowed with ‘a maturity of dramatic and moral feeling which is indispensable to the writing of serious fiction.’ Critic Charles Rolo echoes this praise, writing that ‘Frederick Buechner is a real find. His prose is a literary treat, and his vision is refreshingly original.’
