= George Arthur Buttrick =

American preacher

- Born: March 23, 1892; Seaham Harbour, England
- Died: January 23, 1980; Louisville, Kentucky, U.S.
- Education: Victoria University of Manchester
- Occupations: Presbyterian minister Christian author Academic lecturer

George Arthur Buttrick (March 23, 1892 – January 23, 1980) was an English-born, American-based Presbyterian preacher, author, and lecturer.

== Early life ==
Buttrick was born in Seaham Harbour, a town on the northeast coast of England. He was the only son of the Rev. Tom Buttrick, a Primitive Methodist pastor, and Jessica Amelia Buttrick. He entered the Victoria University of Manchester, in 1909. A lifelong pacifist, he was a conscientious objector during World War I and, as such, served briefly as a YMCA chaplain's assistant until he was wounded and discharged. In 1915 he received his Bachelor of Arts degree from Manchester and then sailed to the United States to be near his fiancee, Agnes Gardner, who had recently moved to Chicago with her family. They were married there in 1916.

== Career ==
Buttrick served as a pastor in Congregational churches in Quincy, Illinois and Rutland, Vermont, and then, from 1921-1927, was pastor of the Old First Presbyterian Church in Buffalo New York. In 1927 he succeeded Henry Sloane Coffin as minister of the Madison Avenue Presbyterian Church in New York City where he remained until 1954. He also became an associate professor of pastoral theology at Union Theological Seminary.

Madison Avenue Presbyterian Church was New York's largest Presbyterian congregation. It was made up of people of all social classes. Of some 1600 families, 200 were well-off, the rest had low or no income. The Great Depression seriously affected many of them. Buttrick found it “irreconcilable with Christianity that 10 percent of the American people owned 95 percent of the nation’s wealth.” He strove in his preaching to “win the hearts of the captains of industry as well as the working poor.” He also considered pastoral care an essential part of his ministry. He devoted significant time to visiting church members in their homes, recalling that he “made thirty [calls] a week for 28 years in a church in mid-Manhattan."

Buttrick became well-known as a preacher and lecturer. In 1953 Life magazine rated him “one of America’s twelve ‘Great Preachers’ and called him ‘one of the most scholarly of Protestant ministers.’” While at Madison Avenue he undertook a total of 794 speaking engagements up and down the northeast corridor and across the nation. In 1931 he delivered the Lyman Beacher Lectures at Yale Divinity School, and in 1932 he was awarded an honorary doctorate degree by Yale University, one of 29 he received during his life. These lectures were the source of his book, Jesus Came Preaching, the second of the thirteen he wrote during his career. The respect in which he was he held was displayed when he was made the main editor of two major Biblical reference works, the twelve-volume Interpreter’s Bible (1951-1957) and the Interpreter’s Dictionary of the Bible (1962.)

Buttrick’s attitude toward preaching is expressed in this excerpt from a lecture series he delivered at the Southern Baptist Theological Seminary in 1943 in the midst of World War II: “The work of preaching is not easy…It is an unremitting labor. Sometimes we cannot see results, but we are not asked to succeed: we are asked only to be faithful to the task. George Tyrrell wrote to Baron von Hugel: ‘What a relief if one could conscientiously wash one’s hands of the whole concern! But then there is that strange Man upon His cross who drives one back again and again!’ Drives one back: Nay, He wins us back again and again, and we know that there is no joy to compare with the joy of being His messengers.”

The president of Harvard University, Nathan Pusey, wished to strengthen the religious programs at Harvard, and in the spring of 1954 he invited Buttrick to join the Harvard faculty. After some hesitation he accepted the invitation and became Plummer Professor of Christian Morals and Preacher to the University. Buttrick delivered his first sermon in Harvard’s Memorial Church on January 2, 1955. For six years his sermons drew full congregations to the church. In addition he taught courses both at the college level and in the Harvard Divinity School. Students also turned to him for counseling.

While at Harvard, Buttrick served as advisor to Phillips Brooks House, the student-run social service organization, and was greatly admired for his dedication to the cause of social justice. This admiration was put to the test when he denied the use of Harvard's Memorial Church to a Jewish couple who wished to be married there by a rabbi. His reasoning, strongly supported by President Pusey, was that the church was a Christian institution, and that permitting it to be used for non-Christian activities would be to secularize it. An intense controversy erupted involving both faculty, students, and donors to the university, ending in 1958 when Buttrick reversed his position on the ground that, "The Harvard community is today a mixed society. It contains numerous groups with religious loyalties other than those which gave shape to Harvard’s ceremonies of public worship."

After leaving Harvard in 1960, Buttrick continued to teach and publish for 19 years. In 1960-1961 he was back at Union Seminary as Harry Emerson Fosdick Visiting Professor. From 1961-1969 he taught homiletics at Garrett–Evangelical Theological Seminary in Evanston, Illinois. From 1969-1971 he taught at Davidson College in Davidson, North Carolina and Vanderbilt University in Nashville, Tennessee. In 1971 he moved to Louisville, Kentucky where he taught homiletics and pastoral theology at Louisville Presbyterian Theological Seminary and at the Southern Baptist Theological Seminary until his retirement in 1979. In his mid-eighties Buttrick was interviewed by a personal assistant who asked him, “How have you managed to get so much done?’’ After a brief pause he responded, “Jesus Christ is more real to me than I am to myself.”

== Legacy ==
Buttrick published one slim book of his sermons, and that with some reluctance; he consigned recordings of them to college libraries where they cannot easily be accessed. He was considered one of the best preachers of his time, but his legacy resides almost entirely in the memories of those who actually heard him. His pulpit manner and his voice were hard to describe. Attempting that, the authors of the following reminiscences differ widely, but they do agree that Buttrick's preaching changed their lives.

Buttrick’s impact on students during his years at Harvard is attested to by a member of the Harvard class of 1959:

“If Memorial Church. . . is a supreme example of the Protestant meeting house, then a supreme preacher is needed to animate the structure, and that Buttrick surely was. In the history of the building has anyone else been able to fill it with worshippers Sunday after Sunday, year in and year out? The very sound of Buttrick’s voice was extraordinary, a pattern of inflections so unique and captivating that merely to exchange a few pleasantries with him over the phone was a memorable experience. To this vocal gift he added theological insight, immense literary knowledge, a matchless rhetorical style, and an honest faith in God. Hearing George Buttrick preach gave me a lifelong belief in the power of rhetoric to do good in human affairs. It also made me a Christian.”

Frederick Buechner, Presbyterian minister and author, cites him as a central influence on his career, including his decision to become a minister: [Webpage contains a photo of Buttrick at the height of his career.]

“At 27, living alone in New York,...I went to hear a famous preacher preach one morning although I had no idea at the time that he was famous and went only on impulse—I was not a church goer—because his church was next door....It was around the time [1953] that Queen Elizabeth was crowned at Westminster Abbey, and the preacher played variations on the theme of coronation….He said that the kingdom of Jesus was not of this world. And yet again and again, he said, Jesus was crowned in the hearts of those who believed in him, crowned king….I remember how the preacher looked up there in the pulpit twitching around a good deal, it seemed to me, and plucking at the lapels of his black gown. And then he went on just a few sentences more. He said that unlike Elizabeth’s coronation in the Abbey, this coronation of Jesus in the believer’s heart took place among confession…. and tears. And then with his head bobbing up and down so that his glasses glittered, he said in his odd sandy voice, the voice of an old nurse, that the coronation of Jesus took place among confession and tears and then, as God as my witness, GREAT LAUGHTER, he said. Jesus is crowned among confession and tears and great laughter, and at the phrase GREAT LAUGHTER, for reasons that I have never satisfactorily understood, the great Wall of China crumbled and Atlantis rose up out of the sea, and on Madison Avenue, at 73rd Street, tears left from my face as though I had been slapped across the face."

== Publications ==
- Parables of Jesus (1928)
- Jesus Came Preaching: Christian Preaching in the New Age (1931)
- Christian Fact and Modern Doubt (1934)
- Prayer (1942)
- Christ and Man's Dilemma (1946)
- So We Believe, So We Pray (1951)
- Faith and Education (1952)
- Commentary Editor, The Interpreter’s Bible, 12 vols (1952)
- Sermons Preached in a University Church (1959)
- Biblical Thought and the Secular University (1960)
- Editor, Interpreter's Dictionary of the Bible, 4 vols (1962)
- Christ and History (1963)
- God, Pain, and Evil (1966)
- The Beatitudes, A Contemporary Meditation (1968)
- The Power of Prayer Today (1970)
- The Interpreter's One Volume Commentary on the Bible (1971)
