= James Muilenburg =

Bible professor and teacher

James Muilenburg (1 June 1896 – 10 May 1974) was a pioneer in the field of rhetorical criticism of the Old Testament.

Muilenburg was born in Orange City, Iowa, and studied at Hope College, the University of Nebraska, and Yale University. He taught at Mt. Holyoke College and the University of Maine before successive appointments as Billings Professor of Old Testament literature and Semitic Languages at the Pacific School of Religion (1936-1945), Davenport Professor of Hebrew and the Cognate Languages at Union Theological Seminary (1945-1963), and Gray Professor of Hebrew Exegesis and Old Testament at San Francisco Theological Seminary (1963-1972). His brother is Walter J. Muilenburg.

Muilenburg was also one of the original translators of the Revised Standard Version.

Muilenburg had two Festschriften published in his honor: Israel's Prophetic Heritage : Essays in Honor of James Muilenburg (1962) and Rhetorical Criticism : Essays in Honor of James Muilenburg (1974). Contributors to the former included Walther Eichrodt, G. Ernest Wright, Martin Noth, and H. H. Rowley; while contributors to the latter included Walter Brueggemann, and Norman Gottwald.
