= Ordination mill =

Religious organization whose members can self-ordinate

An ordination mill is a religious organization or denomination in which membership is obtainable by trivial means and all members are qualified for self-ordination as a minister of religion, bishop, priest or deacon without any prerequisite training, work, experience, seminary study or other qualification. In some cases, ordination may be obtained online or by mail merely by submitting an application and a nominal fee.

In recent times, online ordination has become increasingly popular as a fast way for a person to become registered to perform a wedding for their friends or co-workers.

== History ==
The term ordination mill, intended to be analogous to diploma mill or accreditation mill in higher education, is pejorative. But not for some, as seen below.

The term is not new; US Library of Congress copyright archives list a Camden, New Jersey, newspaper report of "Clergymen made by mail-order ordination mill for $2 in 2 weeks" from 1927. The Universal Life Church, founded as the "Life Church" in 1959 by Kirby J. Hensley in Modesto, California, has long offered ordination by mail and has been at the centre of multiple court cases in which it has sought equal recognition with other denominations on freedom of religion grounds. In 1970, the US Army's Office of the Chief of Chaplains described ULC Modesto as "like a number of similar 'ordination mill' denominations, it has 'no traditional doctrine' and 'will ordain anyone, for life, for a freewill offering'." The Universal Life Church's "freewill offerings" include the amount of $0.00, and the church offers supplemental materials for a fee. The ULC prides itself on being an ordination mill, which includes the case of attempts to free people from going to Vietnam (more details below).

== Legal status ==
An ordination obtained online or by mail does not necessarily guarantee access to reserved clergy parking, preferential treatment during a military draft or tax advantages for individuals, despite an upsurge in demand for US ordinations during the Vietnam War. The church as an organization may qualify for registration as a non-profit organization for activities specifically related to religious ministry, a status the ULC Modesto home church has obtained from the US Internal Revenue Service in some years but not others. Clergy parking permits vary by municipality. In New York City annual permits are issued by the city, not the church, and are subject to narrow criteria: clergy qualify only if they work an average of at least twenty hours per week officiating at or presiding over services, with a limit of three registered vehicles per house of worship. This allows parking for up to five hours adjacent to the house of worship, three hours when visiting hospitals and four hours at a funeral establishment when performing official duties.

The validity of online or mail-order ordination credentials for officiants of weddings, funerals and baptisms varies widely. Many, but not all, US states allow any ordained minister authority comparable to a civil deputy marriage commissioner to officiate weddings. Other countries impose more stringent requirements. In Canada, requirements vary by province but it is not uncommon for provinces to require a denomination be a legally incorporated entity, hold tax-exempt charitable status, be in established operation for a specific amount of time with a minimum number of congregates (other than ordained clergy), operate at least one bricks-and-mortar house of worship in the province and maintain specific records, including lists of officiants and procedures for their appointment or removal. These requirements often pose obstacles to recognition of small, little-known or non-mainstream religious denominations; it is not uncommon for a new denomination to wait two years for Ontario accreditation even if it meets all requirements.

In 2014, Rodney Michael Rogers and Minneapolis-based Atheists for Human Rights sued Washington County, Minnesota under Fourteenth Amendment equal protection of laws and the First Amendment free speech clause, their attorney claiming discrimination against atheists as "When the statute clearly permits recognition of a marriage celebrant whose religious credentials consist of nothing more than a $20 'ordination' obtained from the Church of the Flying Spaghetti Monster ... the requirement is absolutely meaningless in terms of ensuring the qualifications of a marriage celebrant." The case was eventually dismissed for mootness when "Washington County changed its practice and vowed that it would record credentials issued by [Atheists for Human Rights] from that date forward."

Conversely, couples married by officiants ordained by non-accredited entities, such as the "First United Church of Canada" (not to be confused with the similarly titled United Church of Canada) or the "United National Church" selling $80 ordination packages in Ontario from a Toronto Eaton Centre mail address, have had to apply to family court for an "order of validity" to make their marriages official, incurring hundreds of dollars in additional costs. Sometimes, the issue of validity arises during a subsequent divorce or is raised after the remarriage or death of one of the spouses; no valid marriage may mean no alimony, no prenuptial agreement or no widow's benefits as a void or voidable marriage may be annulled.

== Unaccredited degrees and titles ==
In countries with a strong tradition of separation of church and state, governments hesitate to act as arbitrator to decide what is or is not a validly held religious belief. This places churches in a privileged position unlike that of colleges and universities, whose accreditation bodies must answer to national or regional education ministries as a condition of maintaining degree-granting status.

In the United Kingdom, the Doctor of Divinity degree is conferred as a higher doctorate in recognition of sustained scholarly achievement beyond the PhD. Conversely, the degree is mainly awarded in the United States as an honorary title with few (if any) restrictions on its issuance, leading to the adoption of the credential by the Universal Life Church and other perceived ordination mills by virtue of the religious exemption.

In the US, 28 states exempt certain religious institutions from post-secondary education accreditation processes as of 2007; however, institutional definitions range from being inclusively dissentient (California nominally extends the exemption to "non-profit religious corporation[s]" that satisfy specified criteria) to stringently circumscribed (Arizona only permits "religious degrees which are used solely for religious purposes within a religious organization which has tax exempt status from the Internal Revenue Service", while Georgia's exemption encompasses "non-public, non-profit post-secondary educational institutions" that "do not grant postsecondary degrees of a nonreligious nature" and "accept no state or federal funds"). Accordingly, a select number of seminaries that offer full degree programs may elect not to pursue accreditation, committing to non-traditional pedagogical methods including the extensive utilization of distance learning.

Under American federal law, a 1974 judgment accepted expert opinion that an "Honorary Doctor of Divinity is a strictly religious title with no academic standing. Such titles may be issued by bona fide churches and religious denominations, such as plaintiff (Universal Life Church), so long as their issuance is limited to a course of instruction in the principles of the church or religious denomination". Similarly, under the California Education Code, "an institution owned, controlled, and operated and maintained by a religious organization lawfully operating as a nonprofit religious corporation pursuant to Part 4 (commencing with Section 9110) of Division 2 of Title 1 of the Corporations Code" that offers "instruction... limited to the principles of that religious organization, or to courses offered pursuant to Section 2789 of Business and Professions Code" may confer "degrees and diplomas only in the beliefs and practices of the church, religious denomination, or religious organization" so long as "the diploma or degree is limited to evidence of completion of that education"; institutions "shall not award degrees in any area of physical science", while "any degree or diploma granted under this subdivision shall contain on its face... a reference to the theological or religious aspect of the degree's subject area... a degree awarded under this subdivision shall reflect the nature of the degree title, such as 'associate of religious studies,' 'bachelor of religious studies,' 'master of divinity,' or 'doctor of divinity.'" In a 1976 interview with Morley Safer of 60 Minutes, Hensley professed that the Church's Honorary Doctor of Divinity degree was "...just a little piece of paper. And it ain't worth anything, you know, under God's mighty green Earth—you know what I mean?—as far as value." In 2006, Universal Life Church minister Kevin Andrews advised potential degree recipients not to misrepresent the title as an educational achievement to employers, recommending instead that it would be appropriate to list such credentials "under the heading of Titles, Awards, or Other Achievements" on curricula vitae.

Universal Life in Modesto has awarded the Honorary Doctor of Divinity degree and other doctorates (putatively accredited by the church's "International Accrediting Association") for a specified donation and/or passing a contingent examination for over forty years. The advent of mass Internet access has led to a proliferation of sites offering rival unaccredited religious doctorates. The First International Church Of The Web offers an Honorary Doctor of Divinity degree in recognition of life experience, the American Fellowship Church requests a $50 offering for its Honorary Doctor of Divinity Degree, and in addition to online ordinations, Rose Ministries also offers several honorary doctorates in recognition of life experience and the pursuit of knowledge; these sites also offer online ordinations.

== In literature ==
In The Book of Bebb tetralogy by Frederick Buechner, ex-convict Leo Bebb is the head of a religious diploma mill in Florida and founder of the Church of Holy Love, Inc., an ordination mill.

In House With a Hundred Gates (1965), April Oursler Armstrong (the daughter of author Fulton Oursler) describes initially not taking organized religion seriously, then continues with "The year my father became a bishop I was nine and thought it great fun. My father became a bishop with degree and credentials from an ordination mill in California, a mail-order house..."

== See also ==
- Legal status of the Universal Life Church
- Name It and Frame It?, a book about unaccredited colleges, devotes some coverage to ordination mills
- Universal priesthood
