= Ordination (disambiguation) =

Ordination is the process of consecrating clergy.

Ordination may also refer to:

- Ordination (statistics), a multivariate statistical analysis procedure
- Ordination (1640), a painting in Nicolas Poussin's first Seven Sacraments series

== See also ==
- Ordination of women
- Ordination mill
