= Lion Country =

1971 novel by Frederick Buechner

- Cover of the first edition
- Author: Frederick Buechner
- Language: English
- Series: The Book of Bebb
- Publisher: Atheneum
- Publication date: 30 September 1971
- Pages: 256 pp
- ISBN: 0-70-111793-1
- Followed by: Open Heart

Lion Country is a novel by Frederick Buechner, and the first in the Book of Bebb series. Lion Country was written in 1971, and was a finalist for the National Book Award for Fiction in 1972.

Lion Country is written in the first person. The narrator, Antonio Parr, is a writer who attempts a piece of investigative journalism. Parr tries to expose Leo Bebb, a clergyman who runs a diploma mill, as a con-man. Parr becomes friends with Bebb, however, and marries Bebb's daughter.

The title of the novel comes from the Lion Country Safari, which is featured in the book.

Cynthia Ozick calls Lion Country and its sequel, Open Heart, "God-hungry comic novels speckled with dying and laughter."
