= Civil marriage =

Marriage performed, recorded, and recognized by a government official

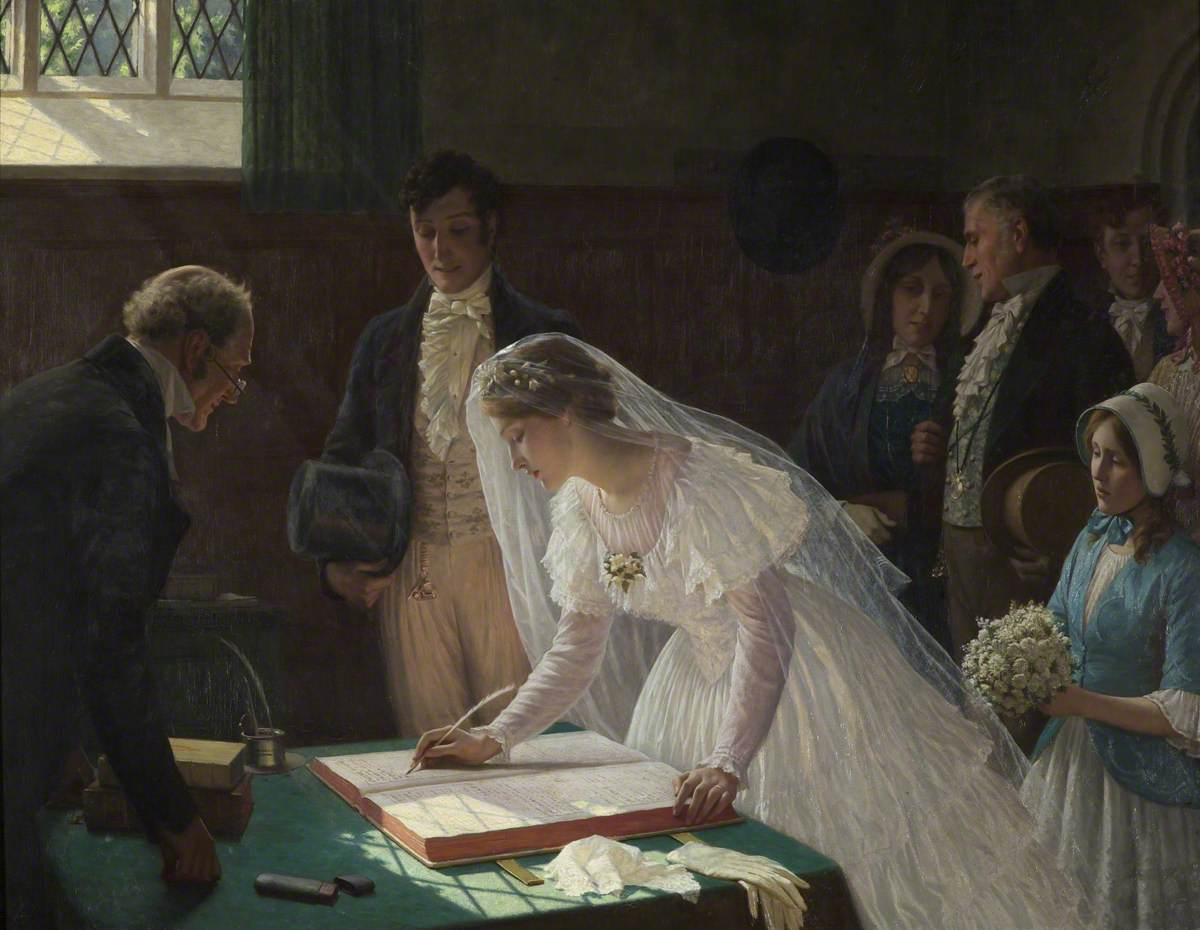
Edmund Leighton, The Wedding Register

A civil marriage is a marriage performed, recorded, and recognized by a government official. Such a marriage may be performed by a religious body and recognized by the state, or it may be entirely secular, in which it is known as a secular marriage.

== History ==
Countries maintaining a population registry of its residents keep track of marital status, and all United Nations (UN) member states except Iran, Somalia, South Sudan, Sudan, and Tonga have signed or ratified either the United Nations Convention on Consent to Marriage, Minimum Age for Marriage, and Registration of Marriages (1962) or the United Nations Convention on the Elimination of All Forms of Discrimination against Women (1979) which carry a responsibility to register marriages. Most countries define the conditions of civil marriage separately from religious requirements. Certain states, such as Israel, allow couples to register only on the condition that they have first been married in a religious ceremony recognized by the state, or were married in a different country.

=== In England ===
In medieval Europe, marriage was governed by canon law, which recognized only those marriages where the parties stated they took one another as husband and wife as valid, regardless of the presence or absence of witnesses. It was not necessary, however, to be married by any official or cleric. This institution was canceled in England with the enactment of the Marriage Act 1753, which required that, in order to be valid and registered, all marriages were to be performed in an official ceremony in a religious setting recognized by the state, i.e. Church of England, the Quakers, or in a Jewish ceremony. Any other form of marriage was abolished. Children born into unions that were not valid under the act would not automatically inherit the property or titles of their parents. For historical reasons, the act did not apply in Scotland. Consequently, until 1940, it continued to be enough in Scotland for a man and a woman to pledge their commitment to each other in front of witnesses to legalize their marriage. This led to an industry of "fast marriages" in Scottish towns on the border with England; the town of Gretna Green was particularly well known for this. The Marriage Act 1836 removed the requirement that the ceremony takes place in a religious forum, and registrars have given the authority to register marriages not conducted by a religious official.

=== In other European countries ===
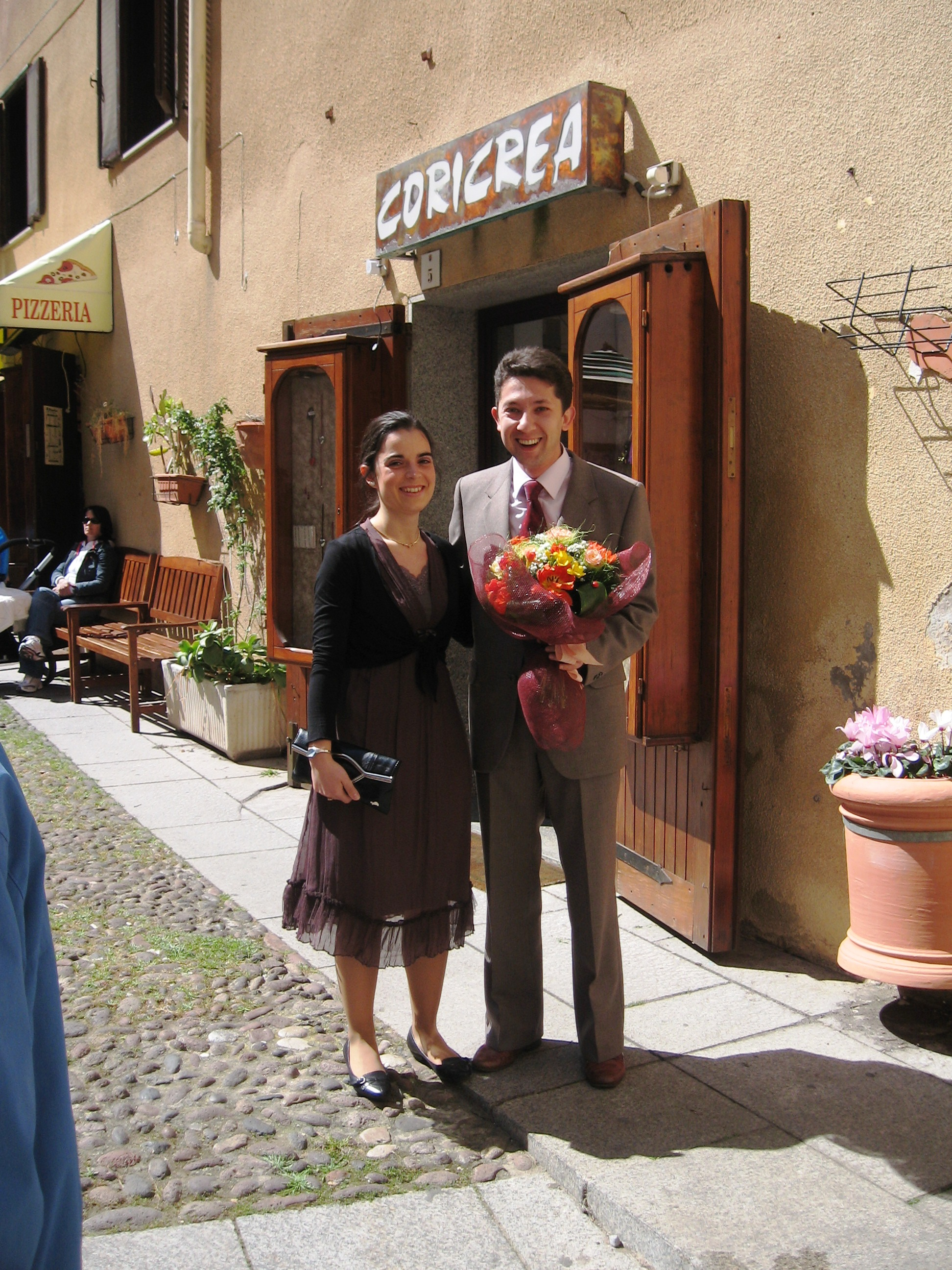
A couple waiting to get married in the town of Alghero on the island of Sardinia, Italy

Many European countries had institutions similar to common-law marriage. However, the Catholic Church forbade clandestine marriage at the Fourth Lateran Council (1215), which required all marriages to be announced in a church by a priest. In 1566, the edict of the Council of Trent was proclaimed denying Catholics any form of marriage not executed in a religious ceremony before a priest and two witnesses.

The Protestant pastor and theologian of Geneva, John Calvin, decreed that in order for a couple to be considered married they must be registered by the state in addition to a church ceremony.

In 1792, with the French Revolution, civil marriage was created in France and made independent from religious marriage which was no more recognised by the French state. In 1802, with the Organic Articles of the Concordat of 1801, Napoleon, advised by Portalis, in order to reconciliate civil and religious marriage in a state-controlled way, stated that religious ceremonies could be performed only for couples who had already been married in a civil ceremony. Napoleon spread this custom throughout most of Europe. In present-day France, only civil marriage has legal validity for the state. A religious ceremony may be performed only after the civil union, and it has no legal effect for the state. Since 1802 in France, religious ministers celebrating religious marriages without preliminary civil marriages risk criminal sanctions.

In Germany, the Napoleonic Code was valid only in territories conquered by Napoleon. With the fall of his empire, civil marriage in Germany began to die out. However, certain sovereign German states introduced civil marriages, which were either obligatory (like the French model) or optional, with either a religious or civil ceremony being accepted. Already before 1848, the Grand-Duchy of Saxe-Weimar-Eisenach enacted optional civil marriages, followed by the German republics of the Free City of Frankfurt upon Main (1850, obligatory), Free and Hanseatic City of Hamburg (1851, optional) and Free and Hanseatic City of Lübeck (1852, optional). German Grand-Duchies such as Oldenburg (1852/55, optional), Baden (1860), and Hesse (1860) as well as the Kingdom of Württemberg (1863) followed suit. Civil marriages enabled interfaith marriages as well as marriages between spouses of different Christian denominations. After the unification of Germany in 1871, the Reichstag adopted a bill initiated by Chancellor Otto von Bismarck as the "Civil Marriage Law" in 1875 (see: Kulturkampf); since then, only civil marriages have been recognized in Germany. Religious ceremonies may still be performed at the couple's discretion. Until December 31, 2008, religious marriages could not be performed until the couple had first married in a civil ceremony.

== In the modern world ==
Civil marriage by country State recognizes civil marriages only State recognizes both civil and certain religious marriages State recognizes civil marriages; no additional information State recognizes religious marriages only Civil marriages only for foreigners Civil marriages only for non-Muslims

=== England and Wales ===
Today marriages in England or Wales must be held in authorized premises, which may include register offices, premises such as stately homes, castles, and hotels that have been approved by the local authority, churches or chapels of the Church of England or Church in Wales, and other churches and religious premises that have been registered by the registrar general for marriage.

Civil marriages require a certificate and at times a license, that testify that the couple is fit for marriage. A short time after they are approved in the superintendent registrar's office, a short non-religious ceremony takes place which the registrar, the couple, and two witnesses must attend; guests may also be present. Reference must not be made to God or any deity, or to a particular religion or denomination: this is strictly enforced, and readings and music in the ceremony must be agreed upon in advance.

=== United Arab Emirates ===
The United Arab Emirates is a federal state in which each emirate retains authority over its local judiciary and the regulation of family law for expatriates. As a result, civil marriage and civil family law are not uniformly applied across the country, and different legal frameworks operate depending on the emirate.

In the Emirate of Abu Dhabi, civil marriage was introduced through Law No. 14 of 2021 on Civil Marriage and its Effects. The law was initially applicable to non-Muslims, but was amended shortly thereafter by Law No. 15 of 2021, which removed the reference to religion and extended the application of the civil family law regime to expatriates generally, as well as to non-Muslim Emirati citizens. This established a secular, non-religious family law system administered by the Abu Dhabi Civil Family Court.

Under the Abu Dhabi civil family law framework, civil marriage is available regardless of religion or nationality, including to both Muslims and non-Muslims, without any residency requirement. The regime also introduced no-fault civil divorce, civil wills, default joint custody of children following divorce, and civil probate and inheritance rules. Under the civil inheritance system, the surviving spouse is entitled to 50% of the estate, with the remainder distributed equally among the children, without gender-based differentiation, in contrast to inheritance rules under Islamic law.

Since the establishment of the Abu Dhabi Civil Family Court in January 2022, approximately 53,000 civil marriages were registered between 2022 and the end of 2025, with an average of around 70 civil marriages conducted per day during that period, involving both Muslim and non-Muslim expatriates.

Outside Abu Dhabi, civil marriage is regulated under a different framework. In December 2022, the federal government enacted Federal Decree-Law No. 41 of 2022 on Civil Personal Status, which applies in other emirates such as Dubai and Ras Al Khaimah. This federal law does not apply in Abu Dhabi, which continues to operate under its own local legislation. While the federal regime closely mirrors the Abu Dhabi model, it includes key differences, including a higher minimum age for marriage and restrictions limiting civil marriage to non-Muslim residents. The federal law also does not adopt Abu Dhabi's approach of permitting non-Muslim judges to preside over civil family matters. These differences have been cited as contributing factors to the higher demand for civil marriage in Abu Dhabi compared to other emirates.

In other Gulf Cooperation Council states, such as Saudi Arabia and Qatar, family law continues to be governed primarily by Islamic law. As a result, expatriates and non-Muslims in those jurisdictions generally lack a domestic legal framework for civil marriage and often rely on marriages conducted abroad.

=== United States ===
Marriage in the United States is largely regulated by state laws, though the Supreme Court has the authority to strike down unconstitutional laws (see Loving v. Virginia and Obergefell v. Hodges).

All states and the District of Columbia, as well as U.S. territories, require a marriage license issued by local civil authorities. As a rule, ministers of religion (e.g., rabbis or pastors) are authorized in law to perform marriages, while such state and local officials as mayors, judges, deputy marriage commissioners, and justices of the peace are empowered to conduct civil wedding ceremonies, which may take place in public offices. Owing to its Quaker heritage, many counties in the Commonwealth of Pennsylvania allow self-uniting marriages for which no official minister is required. The type of ceremony (religious or civil) has no bearing on the legal validity of the marriage, and there is no requirement to precede a religious rite with a civil ceremony. Marriages performed outside of the United States are legally binding if officially recognized by the government of the country in which they are performed.

=== Countries with mandatory civil marriage ===
In most European and Latin American countries there is a civil ceremony requirement. Religious marriages have no legal effect. For some countries, there is an obligation of priority of civil marriage over religious marriage. Such ceremonies, however, only serve to provide religious recognition of the marriage already recognized by the state. In countries such as Belgium and the Netherlands, most couples marry without any religious ceremony at all. Full formal weddings, complete with wedding gowns and the presence of family and friends, are usually conducted in special ceremonial rooms in the town hall.

=== Countries with no civil marriage ===
There is no civil marriage in many Middle Eastern countries, including Jordan, Palestine, Saudi Arabia, Qatar, Iran, Lebanon, and Israel, as well as Libya and Indonesia; all marriages are conducted by religious authorities and registered by civil authorities only after having been registered by authorities of officially approved religions or having been registered abroad. Israel and Lebanon officially recognize Islam, Christianity, Druze, and Judaism as different religious sects within the legal system; marriage is only possible within the same religion but allowed between different denominations of that religion. In Lebanon, depending on gender and religion, interfaith marriages are permissible. A Muslim man may marry a Christian or Jewish woman, but a Muslim woman may not marry outside her faith. Druze themselves only permit intrafaith marriages. In Lebanon, gender and religion intersect in legal affairs. This intersection is captured by the concept of Sextarianism, which highlights that sectarian divisions and gender inequalities both are reinforced by personal status laws. Civil marriages performed extraterritorially, even remotely by videoconference (e.g. under the jurisdiction of the U.S. state of Utah) are recognized by Israel and Lebanon.

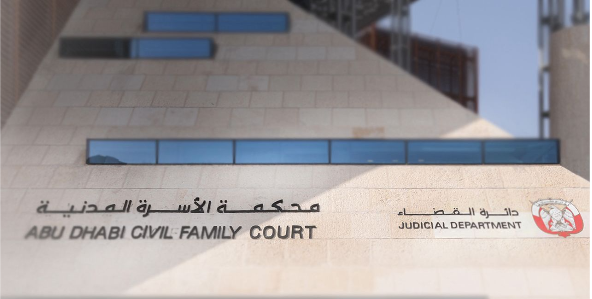
Abu Dhabi Civil Family Court building

Malaysia and the United Arab Emirates allow civil marriage under different legal frameworks. In the Emirate of Abu Dhabi, civil marriage is available to expatriates regardless of religion or nationality, including both Muslims and non-Muslims, and without any residency requirement, under a secular civil family law system administered by the Abu Dhabi Civil Family Court. By contrast, in other emirates such as Dubai and Ras Al Khaimah, civil marriage is generally limited to non-Muslim residents only, with eligibility tied to both religion and residency. it is allowed for foreign citizens only.

=== Civil marriage and other unions of same-sex couples ===
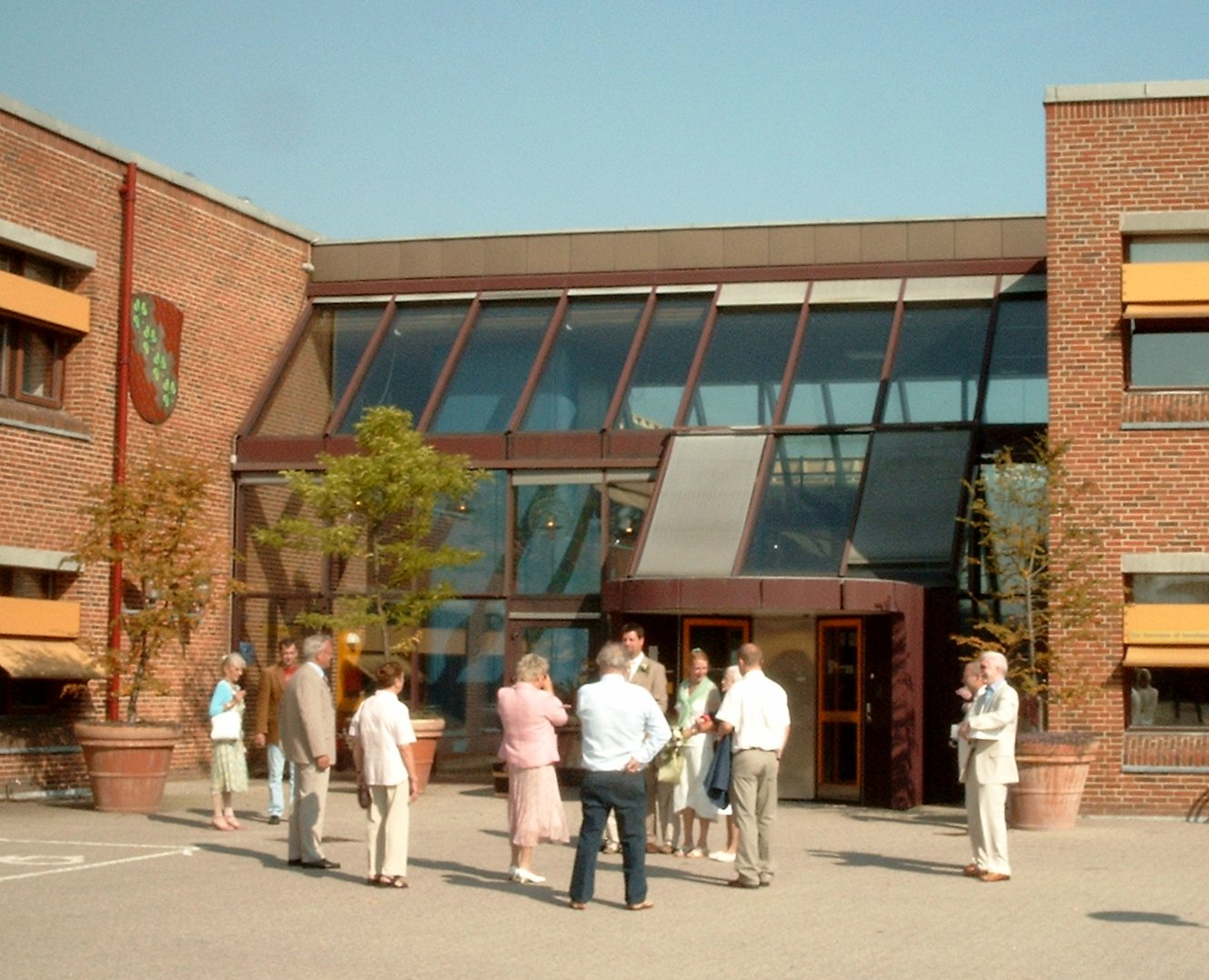
People leaving the town hall of Høje-Taastrup, Denmark following a civil marriage

As of January 2025, the following jurisdictions permit same-sex marriages:

- Andorra
- Argentina
- Australia
- Austria
- Belgium
- Brazil
- Canada
- Chile
- Costa Rica
- Colombia
- Cuba
- Denmark
- Ecuador
- Estonia
- Finland
- France
- Germany
- Greece
- Iceland
- Ireland
- Liechtenstein
- Luxembourg
- Malta
- Mexico
- Netherlands
- New Zealand
- Norway
- Portugal
- Slovenia
- South Africa
- Spain
- Sweden
- Switzerland
- Taiwan
- Thailand
- United Kingdom
- United States
- Uruguay
- Israel recognizes same-sex marriage performed abroad
- Armenia recognizes same-sex marriage performed abroad

In 22 countries worldwide and in several jurisdictions within Mexico, a same-sex couple can be legally partnered in a civil union, domestic partnership or registered partnership. Couples in these unions or partnerships are afforded rights and obligations similar to, but not identical to, those of a married couple.

== Bibliography ==
- van Eijk, Esther (2016). Family Law in Syria: Patriarchy, Pluralism and Personal Status Laws. Bloomsbury Publishing. ISBN 9781786730190.
