= Godric (novel) =

1980 novel by Frederick Buechner

- First edition
- Author: Frederick Buechner
- Language: English
- Publisher: New York: Atheneum
- Publication date: 1980
- Preceded by: The Book of Bebb
- Followed by: Brendan (novel)

Godric is the tenth novel by the American author and theologian, Frederick Buechner. Set in the eleventh and twelfth centuries, the novel tells the semi-fictionalised life story of the medieval Roman Catholic saint Godric of Finchale. It was first published in 1980 by Atheneum, and was a finalist for the 1981 Pulitzer Prize.

== Plot summary ==
Godric of Finchale is joined at his hermitage on the banks of the River Wear by Reginald, a monk sent by the abbot of Rievaulx Abbey with instructions to record the aging saint’s biography. The arrival of the enthusiastic young monk plunges Godric back into his past, and he unflinchingly narrates the ribald tale of his own history, which is carefully edited by Reginald and set down in restrained and laudatory prose more befitting of the life of a saint.

Having survived a near drowning in the sea at a young age, Godric leaves home for a life of petty crime – selling counterfeit relics and the ostensibly holy hair of nuns. Following a dreamlike encounter on the Island of Farne with an apparition who identifies himself as Saint Cuthbert, Godric appears set to spend his life seeking God. His meeting with the roguish Roger Mouse, however, puts paid to any notion of quests for personal holiness. The two embark upon a life of crime and villainy aboard their boat, the Saint Espirit, where they hatch a series of schemes to defraud pilgrims journeying to the Holy Land and commit acts of piracy, all the while hoarding their growing stockpile of treasure.

While attempting to bury his ill-gotten gains, Godric encounters once more the apparition of Saint Cuthbert, a sobering and chastening experience for the prodigal. On returning home following his misadventures Godric discovers that his father has died in his absence. Determined to fulfil his last wish, the bereaved young man begins a pilgrimage to Rome, only to find the Holy City a disappointment: "a corpse without a shroud".

It is on the journey home, however, that Godric encounters God, following a transformative encounter with a wise maiden, Gillian, which convicts him of his past offences. Committing himself to a life of penitence and seclusion, Godric begins a second pilgrimage, this time to the ancient Holy City, Jerusalem. Upon reaching the River Jordan he rushes into its waters and is baptised. After a number of years spent in the service of Ranulph Flambard, Bishop of Durham, Godric espies a likely spot for a hermitage on the banks of the River Wear. No longer a young man, the hermit determines to spend the rest of his days humbly in this rural spot.

The following fifty years are marked by the arrival of notable guests, pilgrims, and acts of penance. Reginald’s optimistic exploration of the life of the saint of Finchdale uncovers more than he anticipated — the aging hermit reveals that his miracles, wisdom, and good deeds are tempered by the harsh realities of sin, murder, and incest.

== Main characters ==
- Godric: Based on the historical figure of Godric of Finchale, a twelfth-century monk and mystic, Buechner’s aging saint is beset by his past, a past that is crowded by miracles and misdeeds, beatific visions and vices, healings and incest. In his autobiographical work, Now and Then (1983), Buechner offers the following assessment of Godric’s life and character:
  He had been a peddler before he turned hermit, and master of a merchant ship. He had tried his hand at piracy for a while. He had rescued Baldwin the First, King of Jerusalem, at the time of the First Crusade. He had not considered himself a saint at all and for that reason balked at giving his blessing to the excessively reverent biography that a contemporary monk called Reginald of Durham was writing about him.
  Hidden away in his secluded hermitage, Godric suffers the visitations of admiring pilgrims and the devotions of his biographer, Reginald. God, his pet snakes Fairweather and Tune, and the River Wear are his constant companions in conversation as he reminisces, at times darkly and at times wistfully, about humanity, his life, and the life to come, coming to the conclusion that: ‘nothing human’s not a broth of false and true’.
- Reginald: an enthusiastic young monk, Reginald of Durham is given the daunting task of documenting the life of Godric for church history and posterity. The biographer studiously ignores both the shadier elements of Godric’s story and the saint’s darker reflections on life and the nature of sainthood, while also rebuffing his attempts to thwart the process of documentation. He blithely creates an optimistic depiction of Godric’s life, and secures the old man’s reputation as a saintly servant of the church, the quest for holiness, and God.
- Burcwen: vivacious and irrepressible, Burcwen is Godric’s younger sister. Following their separation when Godric went off to sea and, subsequently, became a hermit, the two yearn for one another’s company. In their loneliness, pain, and confusion, they fall victim to their passions and vulnerability and commit incest together. Heartbroken by her fall from grace, Burcwen commits herself to a life as a nun, and is only seen once more by Godric, though from a distance.
- Rodger Mouse: Godric’s companion at sea, Rodger Mouse is the protagonist of their misadventures. From their boat, the Saint Espirit, the two commit acts of kidnap, piracy, looting, and rape, taking advantage of pilgrims headed to the Holy Land. Despite his corrupting influence upon Godric, the aged saint retains a great deal of affection for his old companion, praying for him regularly, and reflecting on the life lessons he imparted during their time at sea.

== Composition ==
Godric was composed by Buechner while in full residence at his family home in Vermont, shortly after the publication of The Book of Bebb. In his autobiographical work, Now and Then (1983), Buechner reveals that the novel was authored after his children had left home, and thus represents the beginning of a new life chapter: 'for me', he writes, 'it shook the very foundations themselves and marked the beginning of a new leg of the journey which I am in the midst of still.

The author's discovery of the character of Godric was similar to that of Leo Bebb. In Now and Then he writes: 'I picked up a small paperback book of saints and opened it, by accident, to the page that had Godric on it. I had never so much as heard of him before, but as I read about him, I knew he was for me, my saint.'

== Themes ==
Though Buechner returns to the first person narrative style first utilised in the Bebb tetralogy, Godric appears to have brought with it new challenges to the author. His first foray into period literature, Buechner admits to having grappled somewhat with the problem of creating a prose that evoked medieval England while remaining accessible. In Now and Then he writes that, 'despite the problem of developing a language that sounded authentic on his lips without becoming impenetrably archaic' the novel was still quickly and easily completed.

For Buechner, Godric also represents a fresh reengagement with several substantial themes, many of which are discussed elsewhere in his literature. Among them are sin, the search for identity, faith, and the supernatural. At the forefront, however, and certainly more so than in any of Buechner’s previous novels, is an investigation of death and ageing:

Godric is a very old man as he tells his tale, and old age and the approach of death are very much in the back of his mind throughout. In this sense I think it was a book as prophetic, for me, as the Bebb books had been. It was prophetic in the sense that in its pages, more than half without knowing it, I was trying on various ways of growing old and facing death myself. As the years go by, Godric outlives, or is left behind by, virtually everybody he has ever loved––his sister, Burcwen; his shipmate, Roger Mouse; the two snakes, Tune and Fairweather, who for years were his constant companions; and the beautiful maid, Gillian, who appeared to him on the way back from his pilgrimage to Rome. But, although not without anguish, he is able to let them all go finally and to survive their going. His humanity and wit survive. His faith survives.

Godric is told in Saint Godric's own voice: Buechner intentionally uses style, tone, and word choice to evoke a "mediaeval" manner of speaking. The book unfolds with Godric narrating the events of his life in retrospect, as he looks back on his hundred years of life and does not see the saintly existence that many ascribe to him.

As a historical novel it provides a gateway for understanding mediaeval history with the full breadth of imagination, characterisation and emotion in which non-fiction history is restricted. Some of the historical themes Buechner depicts in the book include blood libels, pilgrimage, Christian asceticism, hagiography, traveling court culture, and Norman and Saxon relations.

== Critical reception ==
In addition to being a finalist for the 1981 Pulitzer Prize, Godric received critical acclaim. Buechner himself has noted his love of the novel, remarking that: ‘If I were to be remembered by only one book, this is the one I would choose. In every way it came unbidden, unheralded, as a blessing.' Literary critic Dale Brown agrees with the author’s preference for Godric, writing that his ‘thirty-year apprenticeship yields and unquestionable masterpiece’. He continues: 'Godric is one of those great books, the kind where we prolong the reading, dread turning that last page, because the journey has been so musical, the journey so complete as to rearrange the chords of our inner lives, the kind of book that makes you want to run up to strangers and ask them if they’ve read it.'

Concerning the prose style that Buechner crafted in order to fully render his twelfth-century protagonist and the world within which he moved, Brown also writes:

Buechner recreates a Saxon feel for his novel, a twelfth-century visitation featuring pre-French-Latinate vocabulary. Although the Anglo-Saxon language is often archaic, context usually provides the sense, and most readers settle into the prose as part of the pleasure of the book. From the major news organs to book review pages all across the country, readers were remarkably effusive in their acclaim, and all of them mentioned the language as part of the triumph.

The Wall Street Journal review of Godric certainly focused in on the author’s prose style, concluding that, 'With a poet’s sensibility and a high, reverent fancy, Mr. Buechner paints a memorable portrait.' Likewise, the reviewer for Booklist referred to the ‘Chaucerian exuberance’ of the novel, while Peter Lewis declared it to be a ‘picaresqe narrative’, and a ‘stylistic tour de force’, formed out of language that is ‘neither ancient nor modern but a bit of both cleverly combined.’ Writing for Times Literary Supplement, Lewis offers further comment on the protagonist of the novel, writing that: ‘In the extraordinary figure of Godric, both stubborn outsider and true child of God, both worldly and unworldly, Buechner has found an ideal means of exploring the nature of spirituality’. In his review, published in New York Times Book Review, Benjamin DeMott presented the author as a ‘major talent’: ‘Frederick Buechner’, he wrote, ‘is a very good writer indeed’. Concerning the novel itself, the reviewer added: ']All on his own, Mr. Buechner has managed to reinvent projects of self-purification and of faith as piquant matter for contemporary fiction [in a book] notable for literary finish'. The novel has also drawn praise from several notable academics and authors. Novelist Tony Abbott wrote that ‘Godric is absolutely astounding, and no matter how many times you read it, it is still moving,’ and Revd Dr Michael Lloyd, principal of Wycliffe Hall, University of Oxford, suggested that "The first line of Godric is one of the best in all of literature.’ In an article written for Newsweek, reviewer Peter S. Prescott also noted the power of the novel’s opening line: ‘From the book’s opening sentence’, he writes, ‘any sensible reader will be caught in Godric’s grip.’ He continues:

Like all good writers of historical fiction, Buechner strives less for verisimilitude than for a vision of the past. […] In telling his long story in such a short space, and from both of its ends at once, Buechner glides deftly from the fanciful to scenes that are nearly realistic […] Buechner has risked much in attempting to define the ambivalences in the life of a saintly man, and risked even more by adopting a language that could easily have become overwrought […] Godric glimmers brightly.

In addition to that of reviewers, Godric has also met with approval from literary academics. In her work, Listening to Life: psychology and spirituality in the writings of Frederick Buechner, Victoria S. Allen affirms the ‘literary excellence’ of the novel, writing that ‘the literary quality of Godric stands on its own.’ Allen points beyond literary questions to the psychological nature of Buechner’s craft, writing that: ‘In Godric Frederick Buechner’s psychological spirituality finds its ultimate literary expression as an old monk listens to his life.’ She further adds that, ‘the use of first-person narration and a natural presentation of the inner dynamics of psychotherapy and spirituality produced a work both secular and religious readers found remarkable.’ Marjorie Casebier McCoy’s investigation into the work of Buechner, Frederick Buechner: novelist and theologian of the lost and found, also features an extensive study of Godric. McCoy suggests that the novel ‘reminds us of all that has gone before in Buechner’s writing’, while insisting that ‘this book must be viewed in a class unto itself among the novels.’ Godric, she writes, 'has all the Buechner ability to draw us into a storied world, to make us listen to the characters and discover that they are talking directly to us, and to compel us to take even the impossible possibility of God and faith in God with complete seriousness'. McCoy concludes by proffering what she perceives as the chief ‘insight’, unearthed by Buechner with ‘sensitivity and brilliance’ in Godric: ‘The distinctiveness of Buechner’, she writes, ‘is that he not only knows the theological power of metaphors in stories told with artistic force and set within a comprehensive religious vision’.
