= Legal status of the Universal Life Church =

The legal status of the Universal Life Church encompasses a collection of court decisions and state executive branch pronouncements determining what rights the Universal Life Church (ULC) and comparable organizations have as religious organizations.

With respect to the validity of ordinations for the purposes of those ordained performing ceremonies with civic consequences such as marriages, individual U.S. states and other countries including the UK have made varying determinations, occasionally hinging their decisions on whether ordination was obtained in person or by some remote means, such as by mail, by phone, or over the internet. As of 2016, all those ordained by the ULC are able to perform marriages in the United States and the United Kingdom. The tax-exempt status of the organization, and of ministries formed by people whom it has ordained, has also been raised as a legal issue. The Internal Revenue Service (IRS) and HM Revenue and Customs (HMRC) initially assumed a negative stance towards the ULC, and at times has sought to eliminate the organization's tax-exempt status under a number of theories, with varying results.

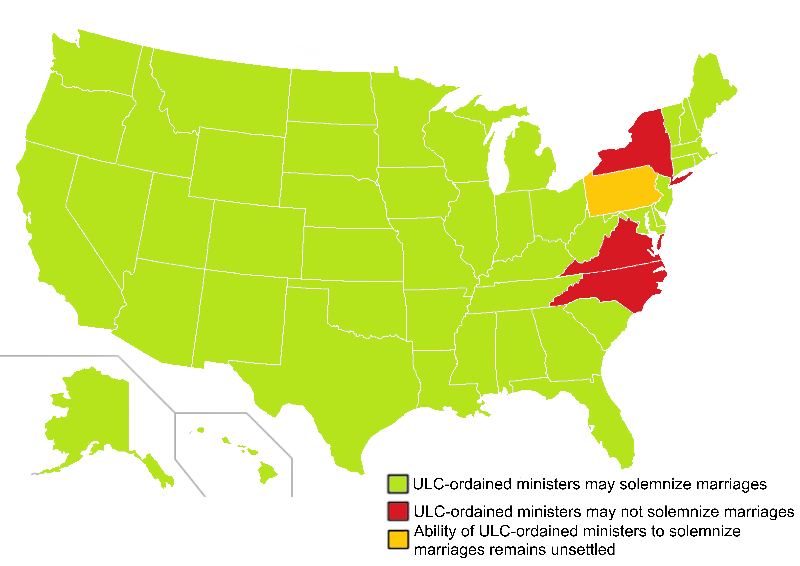
Map of states where the ability of ULC-ordinated ministers to legally solemnize marriages has been expressly affirmed or has not been challenged, and states where this remained unsettled, as of 2011.

== Recognition and tax-exempt status ==
In the 1964 case of Universal Life Church Inc. vs. United States of America, the United States District Court for the Eastern District of California ruled that the Court would not "praise or condemn a religion, however excellent or fanatical or preposterous it may seem," as "to do so . . . would impinge on the guarantees of the First Amendment . . ." All subsequent cases have ruled in favor of Universal Life Church as a legal and valid church establishment. The United States military chaplain's handbook lists ULC as a recognized church.

The Internal Revenue Service (IRS) sued in the 1970s, arguing the ULC was not considered a religious group. The IRS denied the Church's application for tax exempt status in 1969 and again in 1970 on the ground that the Church had engaged in activities outside the religious activities contemplated by the Internal Revenue Code provisions for § 501(c)(3) charitable organizations. After paying the taxes and interest due for fiscal year ending April 30, 1969, the Church brought a suit for refund and prevailed in the case of Universal Life Church v. The United States of America, with Judge James F. Battin's ruling for the ULC. The district court found that the contested activities (ordination of ministers, granting of church charters, and issuance of honorary doctorates) were not a substantial enough part of the Church's activities to justify denying the exemption.

A 1983 ruling of the Australian High Court that a religion need not have a belief in God to be recognized was characterized as opening the door for the Universal Life Church, among others, to operate in Australia. The following year, in the United States, the IRS again revoked the Church's tax exempt status. The Church brought a declaratory judgment action in the United States Court of Federal Claims with respect to its tax-exempt status for the years covered. The Court of Federal Claims upheld the revocation on the ground that the Church had not been operated solely for tax-exempt purposes as required by I.R.C. § 501(c)(3); it gave tax advice to its ministers and failed to control the non-exempt activities of its congregations.

In 1997, the United States Court of Appeals for the Ninth Circuit also upheld the revocation of § 501(c)(3) status by the IRS against a procedural challenge regarding the timing of this revocation. The various lawsuits were settled in 2000 with the church paying $1.5 million in back taxes. In 2001, religious scholar James R. Lewis wrote that the IRS had "always suspected the ULC of being nothing but a tax dodge", noting that the IRS once ruled "that ULC congregations could not receive tax-exempt status because they had no formal beliefs", a determination that was overturned by a federal court ruling that "First Amendment forbade any branch of the government to tell any church whether it must have beliefs or not". Historically, the IRS has ruled in some years, but not in others, that the church and various splinter groups formed from it were tax exempt, depending on issues such as the filing of annual statements.

Most individual U.S. states recognize the church as a legal entity by extending recognition to its ministers. Not all states recognize the ULC as a nonprofit organization; therefore, it is up to each minister to determine his or her legal standing. The ULC assists its ministers who experience problems with being recognized in their home state or country.

== Authority to solemnize marriage and perform other religious ceremonies ==
A large number of people seeking ULC ordination do so in order to be able to legally officiate at weddings or perform other spiritual rites. Sources have reported a 29% increase in the number of friends or family members acting as wedding officiant since 2009, resulting in over 40% of couples in the US in 2016 choosing this option. It has been noted that "[b]ecause the ULC is by far the largest provider of ordinations, online or otherwise, its ministers have been the subject of all or virtually all of the litigation about online ordination and marriage". Ministers ordained by the Universal Life Church are recognized as wedding celebrants, except in "a handful of states that don't recognize as valid marriages performed by ministers ordained online". In states that do not, the solemnization of a marriage by a minister of the Universal Life Church (who is not otherwise authorized) may result in the validity of the marriage being questioned. In countries where ULC ministers have no authority to solemnize lawful marriage, ministers must meet other requirements which might include registering as a notary public, justice of the peace or marriage commissioner.

=== Australia ===
As of 2019, the ULCM noted that "[w]hile several ministers of the Universal Life Church have registered and acted as wedding celebrants in Australia, the Universal Life Church's legal standing there is not as firm as it is in the United States and elsewhere", further noting that they "are actively seeking stronger recognition".

=== Canada ===
As of 2018, ULC ministers were not authorized to solemnize marriage in any province or territory of Canada.

=== United States ===
In the United States, the requirements for entering into marriage are determined by state law. In most states, the ULC clearly falls under the statutes setting forth the requirements for ordination of ministers to perform marriages. In a small number of states, this issue has been litigated, with determinations made by courts at various levels. In Mississippi, for example, it ultimately fell to the Mississippi Supreme Court to recognize the power of a minister of the Universal Life Church to solemnize marriages. although some states allow anyone to solemnize a marriage. Courts in New York, North Carolina, and Virginia have ruled that, under applicable state law, ULC ministers are not authorized to solemnize marriages and a marriage at which a ULC minister officiated therefore is not valid. However other New York courts have allowed ULC ministers to perform marriages. Similarly, lower courts in Pennsylvania have split on the issue.

ULC licenses may also allow ministers to perform other rites, such as baptisms and funerals, as well as providing the option to legally start their own organizations.

==== Alabama ====
Under Alabama law, "[m]arriages may be solemnized by any licensed minister of the gospel in regular communion with the Christian church or society of which the minister is a member", or by "the pastor of any religious society according to the rules ordained or custom established by such society", and this has been reported to include those ordained as ministers of the ULC.

==== Alaska ====
Under Alaska law, "[m]arriages may be solemnized... (1) by a minister, priest, or rabbi of any church or congregation in the state... or by the principal officer or elder of recognized churches or congregations that traditionally do not have regular ministers, priests, or rabbis, anywhere within the state; ... or (3) before or in any religious organization or congregation according to the established ritual or form commonly practiced in the organization or congregation", and as of 2011 no court or administrative ruling had excluded those ordained as ministers of the ULC.

==== Arizona ====
Under Arizona law person "authorized to solemnize marriages" include "[d]uly licensed or ordained clergymen", and as of 2011 no court or administrative ruling had excluded those ordained as ministers of the ULC.

==== Arkansas ====
Under Arkansas law, marriage may be solemnized by persons including "[a]ny regularly ordained minister or priest of any religious sect or denomination", and as of 2011 no court or administrative ruling had excluded those ordained as ministers of the ULC.

==== California ====
Under California law, "a marriage may be solemnized by a priest, minister, rabbi, or authorized person of any religious denomination who is 18 years of age or older", and as of 2011 no court or administrative ruling had excluded those ordained as ministers of the ULC.

==== Colorado ====
Under Colorado Law, "[a] marriage may be solemnized... in accordance with any mode of solemnization recognized by any religious denomination", and as of 2011 no court or administrative ruling had excluded those ordained as ministers of the ULC.

==== Connecticut ====
Under Connecticut law, persons authorized to solemnize marriages include... "all ordained or licensed members of the clergy, belonging to this state or any other state, as long as they continue in the work of the ministry". and as of 2011 no court or administrative ruling had excluded those ordained as ministers of the ULC.

==== Delaware ====
Under Delaware law, "[a] clergyperson or minister of any religion... may solemnize marriages between persons who may lawfully enter into the matrimonial relation", and as of 2011 no court or administrative ruling had excluded those ordained as ministers of the ULC.

==== District of Columbia ====
Under the laws of the District of Columbia, a marriage may be solemnized by "[a] minister, priest, rabbi, or authorized person of any religious denomination or society", and as of 2011 no court or administrative ruling had excluded those ordained as ministers of the ULC.

==== Florida ====
Under Florida law, those "authorized to solemnize matrimony" include "[a]ll regularly ordained ministers of the gospel or elders in communion with some church, or other ordained clergy". The addition of the phrase "other ordained clergy" was passed in 1978 by the Florida Legislature, in order to "specifically, by statute, authorize all ordained clergy to solemnize matrimony–thus eliminating any questions concerning their authority to do so".

==== Georgia ====
Under Georgia law, a marriage may be solemnized by "[a] minister, or other person of any religious society or sect authorized by the rules of such society to perform the marriage ceremony", and as of 2011 no court or administrative ruling had excluded those ordained as ministers of the ULC.

==== Hawaii ====
Under Hawaii law, "[a] license to solemnize marriages may be issued to, and the marriage rite may be performed and solemnized by any minister, priest, or officer of any religious denomination or society who has been ordained or is authorized to solemnize marriages according to the usages of such denomination or society, or any religious society not having clergy but providing solemnization in accordance with the rules and customs of that society", and as of 2011 no court or administrative ruling had excluded those ordained as ministers of the ULC.

==== Idaho ====
Under Idaho law, "[m]arriage may be solemnized by... [a] priest or minister of the gospel of any denomination", and as of 2011 no court or administrative ruling had excluded those ordained as ministers of the ULC.

==== Illinois ====
Under Illinois law "[a] marriage may be solemnized... in accordance with the prescriptions of any religious denomination... provided that when such prescriptions require an officiant, the officiant be in good standing with his or her religious denomination", and further provides that "[t]he solemnization of the marriage is not invalidated by the fact that the person solemnizing the marriage was not legally qualified to solemnize it, if either party to the marriage believed him or her to be so qualified". No court or administrative ruling has excluded those ordained as ministers of the ULC.

==== Indiana ====
In Center for Inquiry, Inc. v. Marion Circuit Court Clerk, the United States Court of Appeals for the Seventh Circuit authorized secular humanists to perform marriages, in part because members of the "Universal Life Church can solemnize a wedding." The court specifically stated:

It is irrational to allow humanists to solemnize marriages if, and only if, they falsely declare that they are a "religion". It is absurd to give the Church of Satan, whose high priestess avows that her powers derive from having sex with Satan, and the Universal Life Church, which sells credentials to anyone with a credit card, a preferred position over Buddhists, who emphasize love and peace.

Efforts have been made to change Indiana's statute governing the ability to perform marriages.

==== Iowa ====
Under Iowa law, "[m]arriages may be solemnized by... [a] person ordained or designated as a leader of the person's religious faith", and as of 2011 no court or administrative ruling had excluded those ordained as ministers of the ULC.

==== Kansas ====
Under Kansas law, "[m]arriage may be validly solemnized [by] [a]ny currently ordained clergyman or religious authority of any religious denomination or society", and as of 2011 no court or administrative ruling had excluded those ordained as ministers of the ULC.

==== Kentucky ====
The Kentucky Office of the Attorney General has issued Opinion 78-303 which states that "the matter of who is a minister of the religious society is left wholly to the recognition of the particular denomination or organization", noting that 'religious society' "is a broad term and includes any group organized and maintained for the support of public worship of God", language which appears to include ministers ordained by the ULC.

==== Louisiana ====
Under Louisiana law "[a] marriage ceremony may be performed by... A priest, minister, rabbi, clerk of the Religious Society of Friends, or any clergyman of any religious sect, who has attained the age of majority and is authorized by the authorities of his religion to perform marriages, and who is registered to perform marriages", and as of 2011 no court or administrative ruling had excluded those ordained as ministers of the ULC.

==== Maine ====
Under Maine law, "[p]ersons authorized to solemnize marriages" include:

B. Whether a resident or nonresident of this State and whether or not a citizen of the United States:

(1) An ordained minister of the gospel;
(2) A cleric engaged in the service of the religious body to which the cleric belongs; or
(3) A person licensed to preach by an association of ministers, religious seminary or ecclesiastical body.

Although the provision relevant to the ULC has not been specifically determined, and no court or administrative ruling has excluded persons ordained by the ULC from solemnizing marriages under this statute without objection from the state.

==== Maryland ====
Under Maryland law "[a] marriage ceremony may be performed in this State by... any official of a religious order or body authorized by the rules and customs of that order or body to perform a marriage ceremony", and as of 2011 no court or administrative ruling had excluded those ordained as ministers of the ULC.

==== Massachusetts ====
Under Massachusetts law, states that "[a] marriage may be solemnized in any place within the commonwealth by the following persons who are residents of the commonwealth: a duly ordained minister of the gospel in good and regular standing with his church or denomination", and as of 2011 no court or administrative ruling had excluded those ordained as ministers of the ULC.

==== Michigan ====
Under Michigan law, "[m]arriages may be solemnized by any of the following:"

(i) A minister of the gospel or cleric or religious practitioner, anywhere in this state, if the minister or cleric or religious practitioner is ordained or authorized to solemnize marriages according to the usages of the denomination. (j) A minister of the gospel or cleric or religious practitioner, anywhere in this state, if the minister or cleric or religious practitioner is not a resident of this state but is authorized to solemnize marriages under the laws of the state in which the minister or cleric or religious practitioner resides.

No court or administrative ruling has excluded those ordained as ministers of the ULC under this language.

==== Minnesota ====
Under Minnesota law, "[m]arriages may be solemnized throughout the state by... a licensed or ordained minister of any religious denomination", and as of 2011 no court or administrative ruling had excluded those ordained as ministers of the ULC.

==== Mississippi ====
In Blackwell v Magee, the Mississippi Supreme Court held that the ULC was authorized to solemnize marriage.

==== Missouri ====
Under Missouri law, "[m]arriages may be solemnized by any clergyman, either active or retired, who is in good standing with any church or synagogue in this state", and as of 2011 no court or administrative ruling had excluded those ordained as ministers of the ULC.

==== Montana ====
Under Montana law, "[a] marriage may be solemnized... in accordance with any mode of solemnization recognized by any religious denomination", and as of 2011 no court or administrative ruling had excluded those ordained as ministers of the ULC.

==== Nebraska ====
Under Nebraska law, "every preacher of the gospel authorized by the usages of the church to which he or she belongs to solemnize marriages, may perform the marriage ceremony in this state", and as of 2011 no court or administrative ruling had excluded those ordained as ministers of the ULC.

==== Nevada ====
Under Nevada law, "[a]ny licensed or ordained minister in good standing within his denomination, whose denomination, governing body and church, or any of them, are incorporated or organized or established in this state, may join together as husband and wife persons who present a marriage license obtained from any county clerk of the State...", and as of 2011 no court or administrative ruling had excluded those ordained as ministers of the ULC.

==== New Hampshire ====
Under New Hampshire law, "[a] marriage may be solemnized... [i]n a religious ceremony by any minister of the gospel in the state who has been ordained according to the usage of his or her denomination, resides in the state, and is in regular standing with the denomination; by any member of the clergy who is not ordained but is engaged in the service of the religious body to which he or she belongs, and who resides in the state, after being licensed therefor by the secretary of state; or within his or her parish, by any minister residing out of the state, but having a pastoral charge wholly or partly in this state", and as of 2011 no court or administrative ruling had excluded those ordained as ministers of the ULC.

==== New Jersey ====
Under New Jersey Law, persons including "every minister of every religion" are "authorized to solemnize marriage between such persons as may lawfully enter into the matrimonial relation". The law further states that "every religious society, institution or organization in this State may join together in marriage such persons according to the rules and customs of the society, institution or organization", and as of 2011 no court or administrative ruling had excluded those ordained as ministers of the ULC.

==== New Mexico ====
Under New Mexico law, "[a] person who is an ordained member of the clergy or who is an authorized representative of a federally recognized Indian nation, tribe or pueblo may solemnize the contract of marriage without regard to sect or rites and customs the person may practice", and as of 2011 no court or administrative ruling had excluded those ordained as ministers of the ULC.

==== New York ====
In the 1972 case of Ravenal v Ravenal, a New York State Supreme Court judge annulled a marriage on the basis that the ULC minister lacked an actual church or stated meeting place. In 1984, a New York Supreme Court judge found in Rubino v City of New York, that New York City had the right to deny licenses to ULC ministers. In the 1989 case, Ranieri v Ranieri, the New York Appellate Division annulled a marriage on basis that a ULC minister lacked qualifications under New York Statutes, having no congregation and not having been appointed by the head of an ecclesiastical order.

A more recent New York court ruling in the 2013 case of Oswald v Oswald, before a different appellate court, ruled that it is a factual question whether the ULC is a "church" whose ministers have authority under New York law to solemnize a marriage; on remand, the plaintiff offered no evidence, and the New York Supreme Court, which in New York is a trial level court, accepted the defendant's evidence that the ULC fits the statutory definition of a "church" and the parties' marriage, performed by one of its authorized ministers, was valid. However, that holding is not binding on other courts. A New York County trial judge stated in 2014 that marriages performed by ULC ministers in New York State are potentially invalid or at the very least in jeopardy. Recognition of the ULC and its ministers by the State of New York therefore remains a question of fact in the Third Judicial Department pending further litigation.

==== North Carolina ====
As of 2025, ULC ordinations are generally recognized in North Carolina without objection for the purposes of performing weddings.

Historically, the effect of such ordinations was less clear. In State of North Carolina v. Lynch (December 1980), a person was convicted of bigamy in a second marriage performed by a ULC minister, but this conviction was overturned on appeal due to the marriage by the ULC minister being found as not a legal marriage. Later, in Fulton v. Vickery (March 1985), a marriage by ULC minister was upheld, since marriage occurred prior to changes to the law made on July 3, 1981. North Carolina law was subsequently to validate marriages performed by ministers of the Universal Life Church prior to July 3, 1981, and marriages solemnized by a ULC minister after that date are voidable, although equitable estoppel may prevent the parties themselves from challenging the marriage if they have taken the position in a judicial proceeding that the marriage was valid. Pursuant to NC § 51-1.1, ULC marriages prior to July 3, 1981 are validated, while the legality of marriages solemnized after July 3, 1981 remains unsettled.

In Lynch v. Universal Life Church (October 1985) an individual accused the ULC of fraud based on representations by the ULC that a person ordained through its services would be able to perform marriages, subject to a disclaimer that those ordained should check with local authorities to determine whether local law permitted this. The church prevailed in the United States Court of Appeals for the Fourth Circuit, which stated:

The church made no unequivocal representation that Wilson was qualified under the laws of North Carolina to perform a wedding ceremony. On the contrary, with respect to his secular qualifications, it directed him to check with local authorities. ... The church cannot be faulted because the advice given by the local official ultimately turned out to be incorrect.

==== North Dakota ====
Under North Dakota law:

Marriages may be solemnized at any location within the state by:

4. Ordained ministers of the gospel, priests, and clergy, authorized by recognized denominations; and

5. By any individual authorized by the rituals and practices of any religious persuasion.

This therefore includes those ordained as ministers of the ULC.

==== Oklahoma ====
Under Oklahoma law, a marriage may be solemnized by "an ordained or authorized preacher or minister of the Gospel, priest or other ecclesiastical dignitary of any denomination who has been duly ordained or authorized by the church to which he or she belongs to preach the Gospel, or a rabbi and who is at least eighteen (18) years of age", and as of 2011 no court or administrative ruling had excluded those ordained as ministers of the ULC.

==== Ohio ====
Under Ohio law, a marriage may be solemnized by "[a]n ordained or licensed minister of any religious society or congregation within this state who is licensed to solemnize marriages... or any religious society in conformity with the rules of its church". No court or administrative ruling has excluded ministers ordained by the ULC under this definition.

==== Oregon ====
Under Oregon law, marriages may be performed by "[a] clergyperson of any religious congregation or organization who is authorized by the congregation or organization to solemnize marriages", and as of 2011 no court or administrative ruling had excluded those ordained as ministers of the ULC.

==== Pennsylvania ====
As of 2025, ULC ordinations are generally recognized in Pennsylvania without objection for the purposes of performing weddings. For example, a 2021 report noted that the Register of Wills office of Bucks County, Pennsylvania, had "recorded 303 marriage licenses to couples with an officiant designated as ordained through Universal Life Church" in the preceding year. In 2021, the Universal Life Church had filed suit against officials in Bucks County and Allegheny County, alleging that these offices denied ULC ministers the right to practice their religion and officiate a wedding ceremony by refusing to recognize their credentials. This legal action resulted in a 2022 settlement in which officials agreed to update the office's training materials and ensure its employees would not challenge the credentials of ULC-ordained officiants.

Historically, the effect of such ordinations was less clear. In the 2007 case of Heyer v. Hollerbush, the York County Court of Common Pleas ruled that a marriage performed by a ULC minister was invalid because the minister did not regularly preach in a church, nor did he have an actual congregation, conditions which the court found to be required by Pennsylvania law. The following year, however, in O'Neill v Bucks County, a different Pennsylvania court affirmed the right for ULC ministers to officiate marriages in Bucks County, Pennsylvania.

==== Rhode Island ====
Under Rhode Island law, officials empowered to join persons in marriage include "every ordained clergy or elder in good standing", and as of 2011 no court or administrative ruling had excluded those ordained as ministers of the ULC.

==== South Carolina ====
The South Carolina Office of the Attorney General has issued the following opinions:

- South Carolina Office of the Attorney General Opinion (11 January 1971)
- South Carolina Office of the Attorney General Opinion (29 March 1973)

These opinions generally hold that those ordained as ministers of the ULC may perform marriages in South Carolina.

==== South Dakota ====
Under South Dakota law, persons authorized to solemnize marriages include "any person authorized by a church to solemnize marriages", and as of 2011 no court or administrative ruling had excluded those ordained as ministers of the ULC.

==== Tennessee ====
The Tennessee Attorney General has issued the following opinions:

- Tennessee Attorney General Opinion 97-138
- Tennessee Attorney General Opinion 97-041
- Tennessee Attorney General Opinion 15-14 In this opinion, the Attorney General has asserted that persons ordained by the ULC are not qualified under Tennessee law to solemnize a marriage.

In 2019, Tennessee passed a law specifically barring ministers ordained over the internet from performing weddings. Universal Life Church Ministries, a Seattle-based offshoot split from the ULC, filed a lawsuit in the United States District Court for the Middle District of Tennessee seeking to have the law declared unconstitutional. In December 2019, the District Court had enjoined enforcement of the statute and stayed proceedings in the case, finding the state to be unprepared to move forward with a defense of the statute.

==== Texas ====
Under Texas law, persons "authorized to conduct a marriage ceremony" include "a person who is an officer of a religious organization and who is authorized by the organization to conduct a marriage ceremony", No court or administrative ruling has excluded ministers ordained by the ULC. The Texas Attorney General has also issued an Opinion on ULC ministers and exemptions from the Psychologists Licensing Act. In a 2019 case, the United States District Court for the Northern District of Texas noted that individuals ordained through the Universal Life Church "can lawfully solemnize marriages because they nevertheless qualify under the Statute".

==== Utah ====
In 2001, the state of Utah passed legislation banning ministers ordained by mail or over the Internet from officiating legal marriage. The following year, the ULC filed a lawsuit challenging the constitutionality of this legislation. The U.S. District Court ruled in favor of ULC, declaring the statute unconstitutional and permanently barring the state from enforcing it. The court found that online ordination is no different than ordination over the phone, by fax, or in person, various methods of ordination allowed under this legislation. Had the law been allowed to stand, it might well have had the unintended consequence of "defrocking" many ministers from traditional churches for purposes of officiating marriage, as the ULC is not the only church to conduct such business via the U.S. Mail.

In Universal Life Church vs. the State of Utah (2002), Internet-based minister ordination was declared valid.

==== Vermont ====
Under the laws of Vermont (a) "[m]arriages may be solemnized by... a member of the clergy residing in this State and ordained or licensed, or otherwise regularly authorized thereto by the published laws or discipline of the general conference, convention, or other authority of his or her faith or denomination", with additional provisions allowing for solemnization by clergy from other states or Canada with specified conditions, and as of 2011 no court or administrative ruling had excluded those ordained as ministers of the ULC.

==== Virginia ====
In 2001, the Virginia State office of the Attorney General issued an Opinion finding that a Clerk of the Court can deem a ULC-ordained officiant to be qualified to perform a marriage, and that the Clerk need not further investigate the qualifications of such a person. On May 22, 2025, the Universal Life Church filed a lawsuit against officials for Augusta County, Virginia, and the City of Staunton, Virginia. The lawsuit alleges that its ministers have faced discrimination in those areas when they attempted to solemnize marriages, actions the ULC argues infringe upon their freedom of religion and are in direct violation of the constitutions of the United States and of Virginia. Litigation on the question is ongoing as of 2025.

The ability of ULC-ordained ministers to solemnize marriages in Virginia has now always been so well-established. Previously, in the 1974 case of Cramer v Commonwealth of Virginia, the Supreme Court of Virginia held that a trial court did not err by rescinding the authority of ULC ministers to perform marriages based on Virginia Code section 20-23. The Court had stated at that time: "[w]e do not believe that the General Assembly ever intended to qualify, for licensing to marry, a minister whose title and status could be so casually and cavalierly acquired".

==== Washington ====
In the state of Washington, persons authorized to solemnize marriages include "any regularly licensed or ordained minister or any priest, imam, rabbi, or similar official of any religious organization", and as of 2011 no court or administrative ruling had excluded those ordained as ministers of the ULC.

The Washington State Office of the Attorney General has issued General Opinion No. 117 (1971), noting that marriages performed in the state are "valid if at least one of the parties thereto believed that the person who did so had the authority to solemnize their marriage".

==== West Virginia ====
Under West Virginia law, persons authorized to perform marriages include a "religious representative", defined as "a minister, priest or rabbi and includes, without being limited to, a leader or representative of a generally recognized spiritual assembly, church or religious organization which does not formally designate or recognize persons as ministers, priests or rabbis", and as of 2011 no court or administrative ruling had excluded those ordained as ministers of the ULC.

==== Wisconsin ====
Under Wisconsin law, a marriage may be solemnized by "[a]ny ordained member of the clergy of any religious denomination or society who continues to be an ordained member of the clergy", and as of 2011 no court or administrative ruling had excluded those ordained as ministers of the ULC.

==== Wyoming ====
Under Wyoming law, persons by whom marriage may be solemnized include "every licensed or ordained minister of the gospel, bishop, priest or rabbi, or other qualified person acting in accordance with the traditions or rites for the solemnization of marriage of any religion, denomination or religious society...", and as of 2011 no court or administrative ruling had excluded those ordained as ministers of the ULC.

== See also ==
- Law and religion
