= The Book of Bebb =

1971 novel by Frederick Buechner

- Cover of the first collected edition
- Lion Country; Open Heart; Love Feast; Treasure Hunt
- Author: Frederick Buechner
- Language: English
- Publisher: New York: Atheneum
- Published: 1971–1977
- No. of books: 4
- Preceded by: The Entrance to Porlock
- Followed by: Godric

The Book of Bebb is a tetralogy of novels by the American author and theologian, Frederick Buechner. Published in 1971 by Atheneum, New York, Lion Country is the first in the Book of Bebb series. It was followed by Open Heart (1972), Love Feast (1974), and Treasure Hunt (1977). In 1972 Lion Country was named a finalist in the National Book Award for Fiction. The Book of Bebb is an edited single volume edition containing the four novels, and it was published by Atheneum, New York, in 1979.

The Bebb novels revolve around the figure of Leo Bebb, a clergyman with a shady past, and are narrated by his son-in-law, Antonio Parr. Leland Ryken, Philip Ryken, and Todd Wilson suggest that the story raises the issues of "using one's ministry to escape from and rectify one's past, using proof texts from the Bible to justify one's actions with no accountability, placing ministry ahead of family, and presenting the gospel through outlandish and sometimes fraudulent means."

== Summary of the plots ==
=== Lion Country (1971) ===
Antonio ‘Tono’ Parr’s life is held hostage by paralysis. His sister’s protracted decline in the cancer ward of a hospital in Manhattan engenders in Tono a slowly increasing sense of numbness, as he is gradually overwhelmed by grief. Faced with the death of this, the last living member of his family, and with the growing tragedy of his own life, which is characterised by listlessness and failure in all areas – from romance to sculpting, and from teaching to writing – Tono is galvanised into action by his discovery of an advertisement for a mail order theology diploma: ‘Put yourself on God’s payroll – go to work for Jesus now’, the advertisement reads, with a payment address at ‘the Church of Holy Love, in Armadillo, Florida’. Resolving to write an exposé of the scheme with the hopes of publishing it in a prestigious New York publication, Tono finds himself face to face with its creator, the mercurial Leo Bebb. The novel opens as Bebb parts from Tono, descending down into a subway station on Lexington Avenue, leaving the would-be investigative journalist to ponder over their extraordinary meeting ‘in a lunchroom between Third and Lexington in the Forties someplace, all tiled walls and floor like a men’s room’. Bebb, he remembers with a sense of distaste, had ordered ‘chocolate milk, which he sweetened with sugar’, before quietly declaring that the man at the counter was an angelic being.

Fascinated, and still insisting to himself that his motivation is righteous and research-based, Tono follows Bebb down to Armadillo, Florida. Though he has not informed anyone there of his decision to travel, Tono’s arrival in Armadillo is unsettling. Bebb is not there, having flown to Texas on “the Lord’s business”; Tono is greeted by Laverne Brown, his assistant pastor, but is surprised and not a little unnerved to learn that Brown is expecting him, having been informed by Bebb that he would come.

Despite refusing Brown’s offer of a room at the manse, claiming to have already paid for a room in a local motel, Tono cannot refuse an invitation to spend the evening with Brown and Bebb’s wife, who, he discovers, is an alcoholic. Tono’s attempt to investigate The Church of Holy Love, Inc. is thwarted by Bebb himself, who lifts the inquiring mind of the would-be journalist away from his apparently shady dealings and his wife’s dark past, and fixes it upon the fair frame of his adopted daughter, Sharon. This proves to be more than a distraction as, following several liaisons at the motel, Tono and Sharon fall in love. Their gradual unburdening to one another, and their joint exploit with Bebb to a local safari park, where the bald preacher terrifies Tono by nonchalantly climbing out of the car to take a photo of two lions in the act of mating, acts to draw Tono out of himself, and to slowly loosen his grip on his past failings and present sense of paralysis. As such, when he is urgently called back to New York by his sister, Miriam, who is desperate to see her children one last time before she dies, not only is Tono able to go by aeroplane, a mode of travel that would have been previously inconceivable for him, but when he arrives he easily facilitates this final meeting, and is able to offer comfort and council to his sister, his nephews, and their indolent father, Charlie. Bebb’s journey to Texas has yielded fruit in the form of a wealthy new benefactor, Herman Redpath, a native American businessman who is convinced that Bebb’s prayers for him have brought a guarantee of good health and continued prosperity. Thus, Tono’s final conclusions are no less confused and uncertain than his expectations at the outset of the novel: perhaps Bebb is the real deal, perhaps he is not. The couple are married at Bebb’s new home on the Redpath ranch, where the industrious preacher is engaged in building a new Church of Holy Love, and extending his ministry across the USA.

=== Open Heart (1972) ===
The death of the aging native American businessman, Herman Redpath, signifies a change in circumstance for Leo Bebb, his wife Lucille, and their friend Brownie – assistant pastor of the Church of Holy Love, and Dean of Bebb’s mail order seminary enterprise, The Gospel Faith College. Having spent five years performing the role of private pastor on the Redpath ranch, Bebb is delighted to be remembered generously in the deceased businessman’s will. Finally conferring sole stewardship of the Church of Holy Love upon Brownie, the preacher speedily moves north to Connecticut, where Tono (now known by his full name, Antonio) Parr has settled with his wife Sharon, their baby, and his two teenage nephews, Chris and Tony.

Arriving in Connecticut, Bebb rents a farmhouse nearby Antonio and Sharon’s home, and immediately sets to work transforming its largest barn into a chapel, complete with his trademark neon sign: a cross, its horizontal formed of the word ‘OPEN’ and an adjoining heart emblem, and its vertical formed of the word ‘HEART’. Antonio, whose life as a father, English teacher, and amateur sculptor is hazy and unrewarding, numbly observes Bebb’s energetic efforts to launch this new ecclesiastical endeavour. Disillusioned by his failed attempts to enthuse his students about King Lear, Antonio is beset by a dawning realisation that all is not quite right within his house. Sharon, who Dale Brown characterises as ‘a woman of the 1970s’, appears occupied with her yoga, speed-reading, guitar lessons, and the comfortable domesticity of motherhood and life in the north-East – including trips to the local school playing fields, where the sixteen-year-old Tony spends much of his free time as the star of the school track team.

His church finally ready for its congregation, Bebb sends out the ads and throws open the doors, only to be greeted by a small flock, not consistent with the exclusive New England crowd for which he had hoped. Determined to go ahead, however, he ascends the pulpit in his robes, and proceeds to preach on Paul’s letter to the Ephesians. During the sermon, Lucille Bebb rises unsteadily to her feet, and leaves the chapel. When she goes missing several days later Antonio is unable to fully participate in the search for her, having learned in the intervening days that his wife and his oldest nephew, Tony, have been passionately engaged in an affair. Upon realising, following a heavily coded telephone conversation with Brownie, that Lucille has fled south back to Florida, Bebb and Antonio make their way down to Armadillo, only to discover that she has committed suicide.

Overcome with grief and forced to pick up the pieces of his shattered life, Bebb moves in with Sharon, Antonio, and their family. Into this new, strange, and restless existence steps Clarence ‘Fats’ Golden. A mysterious figure, who has hovered on the periphery throughout the story, Golden finally reveals himself as Bebb’s old cellmate from his days in prison. Charged with indecent exposure, the details of Bebb’s incarceration have long remained hidden to both Sharon and Antonio, who are greatly surprised by Golden’s revelations. The couple are left uncertain of the truth, however, when Bebb suggests that they should not believe his stories, and proposes a holiday to Europe. The three set sail for England, with Bebb still inwardly processing his grief, while Sharon and Antonio consider the prospect that their marriage might be in need of saving.

=== Love Feast (1974) ===
Leo Bebb’s friendship with a wealthy septuagenarian, Gertrude Conover, which began while on the voyage to England at the close of Open Heart, becomes the basis for a new, explosive ministry partnership. A theosophist with blue hair and a house in Princeton NJ, Gertrude informs Bebb of their love affair in a previous life, in which he, a priest named Ptah-Sitti, had impregnated her, a ward of the Pharaoh, named Uttu. Bebb is enchanted.

The commencement of their partnership, however, is delayed by circumstances, not least the fallout of Lucille’s suicide. Bebb, confronted by the collapse of his ministry in Connecticut, returns to the Redpath ranch in Texas, there to pick up the pieces with Brownie. Antonio, meanwhile, is confronted by the slow disintegration of his marriage. Sharon has opened a health food store with her friend, Anita Steen, and Antonio suspects that the two have begun a romantic affair together. Alone, but for occasional visits from Gertrude and Bebb who have taken to going on extravagant holidays together, Antonio is paralysed by the situation, until Sharon tells him to leave the house – a command with which he meekly complies. Returning from another holiday, Bebb is greatly troubled by the breakdown of their marriage. It is Sharon’s rejection of his proffered prayers, however, and her revelation that she does not believe in God, that sends the stunned Bebb into a crisis of his own.

Laid up and in mourning at Gertrude Conover’s retreat centre in Princeton, Bebb is roused from his stupor by her suggestion that they throw a Thanksgiving meal for students in the area. When only a small number turn up to a banquet prepared for over a hundred, Bebb preaches from Luke 14 – the parable of the great feast – and sends his inspired guests out into the highways and byways in search of the hungry, the lonely, and the passer-by. In an extraordinary string of events consonant with the contemporary ‘Jesus Movement’, the banquet hall is filled with hungry guests, and a revival, led by Bebb and a young woman named Nancy Oglethorpe, breaks out in Princeton.

While Bebb is celebrating this, perhaps his most far-reaching spiritual coup, Antonio is pitched even further into depression. Any enthusiasm that he has gleaned from the revival movement is short-lived, and his English lessons are tinged with bleakness. He is finally devastated by news that Tony and Sharon have resumed their affair – his nephew having moved back into the house where it began several years earlier. His decision to retreat to Gertrude Conover’s centre in Princeton yields little comfort, as he discovers Bebb embroiled in a battle with a professor of history, Virgil Roebuck, whose atheistic rants are disrupting the preacher’s meetings.

Finding his father-in-law preoccupied and desperate for guidance, Antonio decides to spend Christmas with Brownie in Texas. While staying at Open Heart, he is drawn into a drug-fuelled mystical experience with the native Americans, instigated by the elderly and mischievous John Turtle. In the hallucinatory vision that follows, Antonio converses with the deceased: Herman Redpath, Lucille Bebb, and his sister, Miriam. Still beset by uncertainty, and not knowing that Sharon has herself fled south to Florida, Antonio finds himself back in Connecticut, heading for a sexual liaison with an ex-student, Laura Fleishman. Upon returning to the northeast, Antonio finds Bebb engaged in a desperate conflict with both the IRS and the university, which culminates in a protest march and a riot. Both scandals force Bebb into hiding, but news of the situation brings Sharon back from Florida, and forces an encounter between herself, Antonio, and Bebb, who gives them marital advice. Their shared sense that Bebb is bidding them goodbye is made concrete when, as a parting shot before fleeing the area, Bebb and Fats Golden hire a plane with the banner "Here’s to Jesus", and fly it over Princeton, only for it to crash in flames in a nearby potato field.

=== Treasure Hunt (1977) ===
The uncertainty about whether Bebb truly died in the plane crash at the close of Love Feast continues to haunt those he has left behind. The fact that neither his body nor the body of Fats Golden were found in the wreckage, combined with the strange sense that he is somehow present with his mourning family, makes closure impossible. Additionally, the complexity and fragility of Antonio and Sharon’s marriage is heightened by the introduction of two new elements into the situation. Sharon gives birth to a baby, and no one is certain as to who the father is – Antonio, or his nephew, Tony. Equally complicated is the recent marriage of Tony to Laura Fleishman, an ex-student of Antonio’s with whom, following Sharon’s betrayal of him, he had briefly had an affair of his own.

As Sharon and Antonio sit with Gertrude Conover and listen to an audio tape recording of one of Bebb’s sermons, it seems as though he is speaking to each of them, most directly to Sharon, his adopted daughter. Bebb’s homiletical musings on his humble beginnings in Poinsett, South Carolina, and his gift of an old house located there to Antonio and Sharon in his will, prompts them to discuss the possibility of some sort of pilgrimage to the old preacher’s home town. The implied suggestion that a secret worthy of discovery lies in wait there for Sharon ensures that, accompanied by Gertrude Conover, the couple will make the journey south, leaving their children in the care of Tony and Laura. Their shared, though hardly believed, suspicion that Bebb might be speaking to them from beyond the grave – a notion heartily supported by Gertrude – is made more difficult to refute by Antonio’s dreams, which are haunted by his deceased father-in-law, and his obligatory mysterious pronouncements. Antonio’s search for meaning, a central concern of each of the three preceding novels, resurfaces while in this dream state. When Bebb refuses to answer his questions he turns to Brownie for spiritual advice, only to discover that Bebb’s old assistant pastor has lost his fortune, his confidence, and his faith. In a reversal of roles, it is Antonio who offers the depressed Brownie hope and counsel.

The pilgrimage to Poinsett promises to be a drawn out affair, as Gertrude Conover suggests that the three are driven by her chauffeur, Callaway, and that they take in the sights on their way south. Their uneventful explorations, which include a visit to the Library of Congress where Antonio thinks he has caught a glimpse of Bebb, end in their arrival in South Carolina. Poinsett proves to be a desolate place, and the house that Bebb has gifted to them, which has been turned into a ‘UFORIUM’, is not at all what they had imagined. There waiting for them are Babe and Bertha Bebb: the latter a wig-wearing and absent-minded housewife, and the former the twin brother of Leo Bebb, and proprietor of the Uforium – a museum and record-centre of local extra-terrestrial experiences. Brownie joins the pilgrims in Poinsett, not knowing that this will be his last journey and resting place, as, following a bruising exchange of words with Babe, Bebb’s old friend suffers a heart attack and falls down dead.

The harsh exchange of words is brought about by Babe’s disavowal of his deceased brother’s faith. Despite having something of his brother’s air and perceptiveness, Babe Bebb is convinced that Jesus and all other mystical figures throughout history are examples of alien visitations to Earth. Gertrude Conover appears ready to believe in this new vision of the universe, but Antonio and Sharon are less convinced. Unwilling to fully abandon her theosophism, however, Gertrude begins to search for Bebb’s reincarnated soul, and finds it in the newly born local baby boy, Jimmy Bob Luby. The refusal of everyone else to believe in her declaration that she has located Bebb, however, combined with the slow break down of relations in the house and the disturbed Bertha Bebb’s apparent tendency to commit acts of vandalism in the community, leads to a series of confrontations, culminating in Sharon’s realisation that Bertha is her biological mother, and Leo Bebb her father. The mystery of her origin is laid bare, and questions regarding her own upbringing and Bertha’s lifetime of strange behaviour are answered. This revelation, and the multiple revelations of Babe’s corrupted character – which both explains Bebb’s character and throws it into sharp relief – are the reasons why Bebb has brought his friends to Poinsett. Sharon and Antonio leave the town having gained a greater understanding of Bebb’s significance, and of their own place in the world.

== Main characters ==
- Leo Bebb (Lion Country, Open Heart, Love Feast): In his autobiographical work, Now and Then (1983), Buechner offers a compelling description of the character of Leo Bebb:

He was a plump, bald, ebullient southerner who had once served five years in a prison on a charge of exposing himself before a group of children and was now the head of a religious diploma mill in Florida and of a seedy, flat-roofed stucco church called the Church of Holy Love, Incorporated. He wore a hat that looked too small for him. He had a trick eyelid that every once in a while fluttered shut on him.

- Antonio Parr (Lion Country, Open Heart, Love Feast, Treasure Hunt): Antonio, or ‘Tono’ is a man struggling to find an identity and purpose with which to give his existence meaning. Numbed by his sister’s slow succumbing to cancer, wracked by doubts, and by doubts about his doubts, Antonio’s life is dogged by mild failures: his inability to make a success in the worlds of teaching, sculpture, writing, and eventually marriage. Ironically, it is his failure to entrap Bebb and author an exposé on his mail order seminary that leads him into deeper realizations about life and his place within it. Dale Brown notes the similarities between Antonio and several of Buechner’s previous characters: ‘no Buechner character to this point has been more full of longing, more incomplete, than Tono’, he writes, ‘though he is certainly brother to Tip Ringkoping [The Entrance to Porlock (1970)], Theodore Nicolet [The Final Beast (1965)], and Peter Cowley [The Season’s Difference (1952)].’
- Laverne Brown (Lion Country, Open Heart, Love Feast, Treasure Hunt): the assistant pastor at Bebb’s Holy Love church, Brownie is also involved in the administration of the mail order seminary. When Antonio first encounters Brown, the preacher offers a somewhat original interpretation of a Biblical passage, explaining away its difficult edge. Brownie’s propensity to smooth out the more challenging texts of Scripture is emblematic of his boundless optimism, and his apparent determination to be content with the world as it is.
- Sharon Parr, nee Bebb (Lion Country, Open Heart, Love Feast, Treasure Hunt): the apparent adopted daughter of Bebb and Lucille, Sharon is playful, confident, and yet, like Antonio, suspended between doubt and certainty, both with regards to her faith and also with regards to Bebb himself. Her love for Antonio leads her into a quiet courtship with him, and eventually into marriage. The difficulties of married life, however, and unanswered questions about her past, make her partnership with Antonio a strained one. The final revelation that Bebb is her father, and that her mother is the wife of Bebb’s twin brother, provides resolution to Sharon’s questions regarding her own identity.
- Lucille Bebb (Lion Country, Open Heart): Lucille’s alcoholism, and her particular penchant for ‘Tropicanas’, which, as Antonio discovers, are composed of ‘two parts […] orange juice’, and a third part ‘gin’. Like her daughter, Lucille also appears somewhat cynical about the work of her husband, and occasionally mocks or criticizes him in front of her guests. In conversation with Sharon, however, Antonio learns of the tragic death of the Bebbs’s first and only child, who, it is rumored, died accidentally at the hands of Lucille herself.
- Miriam Blaine, nee Parr (Lion Country): Miriam is confined to a hospital bed for the entirety of Lion Country, as her body is slowly crippled by cancer. Her conversations with her twin brother, Antonio, are often directed towards encouraging him to improve his life and outlook, or devoted to remembering their shared childhood. A divorcee and mother of two, Miriam is desirous to see her two sons adopted by Antonio – an initially happy outcome that is brought about when Antonio marries Lucille, and the two move to Connecticut.
- Gertrude Conover (Open Heart, Love Feast, Treasure Hunt): a septuagenarian theosophist with blue hair and a prophetic air, Gertrude becomes a confidante and supporter of Bebb following Lucille’s suicide. Her home in Princeton NJ is the home of Bebb’s great revival in Love Feast, and her penchant for travel helps to instigate Sharon and Antonio’s pilgrimage to Poinsett, South Carolina, in Treasure Hunt. Convinced that she and Bebb had enjoyed a love affair in a previous life – she as the ward of a Pharaoh and he a priest of Ptah – a number of critics including Dale Brown have noticed the similarities between her character and the figure of Agnes Sanford, a mystic, whose influence Buechner notes in Now and Then.
- Tony Blaine (Lion Country, Open Heart, Love Feast, Treasure Hunt): the youngest son of Miriam and Charlie, Tony is described by his uncle Antonio as a ‘muscle-bound jock’, and a: 'track star and Lothario who glittered in the waters of our domesticity as harmless as a beach ball until you touched him the wrong way, or the right way, and he went off like a mine, scattering wreckage for miles.’ Tony’s affair with his adoptive mother is both a symptom and cause of the breakdown of Antonio and Sharon’s marriage, and his eventual union with Laura Fleishman, with whom Antonio has had an affair, is a further cause of confusion and tension.
- Chris Blaine (Lion Country, Open Heart, Love Feast, Treasure Hunt): the eldest son of Miriam and Charlie, Chris is described by his uncle Antonio as:
  [T]hat pimply, pale, and stage-struck boy who was endlessly exploited by Sharon as resident baby-sitter [...]. After graduating from Sutton High, where I taught English, he was accepted at Harvard, where he went with every intention of becoming Elia Kazan if not Tennessee Williams only to become instead Merrill, Lynch, Pierce, Fenner and whoever it is rolled into one. He started a typing service his freshman year, branched out into Xeroxing as a sophomore, and by the time he was a junior was earning more than his tuition and switching his major from Drama to Economics. Vacations he took to spending with his father and Billie Kling and summers he worked as runner for a Wall Street brokerage so that Sharon and I rarely saw him.
- Charlie Blaine (Lion Country, Open Heart, Love Feast, Treasure Hunt): ex-husband of Miriam and father to Chris and Tony, Charlie is an ineffectual hypochondriac, who, though harmless, is generally incapable of considering others.
- Clarence “Fats” Golden (Open Heart, Love Feast): Bebb’s ex-cellmate, Golden is initially a mysterious figure, whose harmless smile appears to bely harmful ulterior motives. It is wondered whether he is an angel, or a malevolent presence sent to disturb Bebb’s ministry, until Golden reveals himself as an old friend of the preacher with many tales to tell, most of which Bebb insists are not to be believed.
- Babe Bebb (Treasure Hunt): Leo Bebb’s twin, Babe shares a number of similarities with his brother, including a certain self-confidence and perceptiveness. Unlike Bebb, however, Babe is convinced that the world has been visited by aliens, and that all of the holy figures throughout history are best understood as being extra-terrestrial beings. Beyond this alternative worldview, however, Babe is also endowed with a cruel streak, which leads him to dress up as his disturbed wife, Bertha, and terrorize the local townsfolk at night in order to gain power over them.
- Bertha Bebb (Treasure Hunt): wife of Babe, Bertha’s absent-mindedness and strange behavior suggest the suppression of a past source of grief or trauma. That source is revealed to be Sharon, who is the love child of Bertha and Leo Bebb, and was adopted by Sharon and Bebb after their own baby mysteriously died. Bertha initially responds well to Sharon’s desire for them to begin a new life as mother and daughter back in Connecticut, but, after Babe is revealed to have been terrorizing the townsfolk, she decides to stay with him, rather than leaving him to die alone.

== Themes ==
In Now and Then Buechner reflects on the themes that run through the Bebb novels. Concerning his departure into a first person narrative and the injection of comedy into his prose, the author writes:

[F]or the first time as a novelist I used the device of a first-person narrator, and although Antonio Parr was by no means simply myself in thin disguise – our lives had been very different; we had different personalities, different ways of speaking – just to have a person telling his own story in a rather digressive, loose-jointed way was extremely liberating to me as a writer. For the first time I felt free to be funny in ways that I hadn't felt comfortable being in print before, to let some of my saltier-tongued characters use language that before had struck me as less than seemly in a serious work of fiction, to wander off into quirkish reminiscences and observations that weren't always directly related to my central purpose.

With their exploration into the inner life of their central character, the novels are a continuation of the character-driven focus that became one of the hallmarks of the earlier fiction. Buechner’s choice of a first-person narrative, however, differentiates the tetralogy from Buechner’s previous novels because, rather than revealing their thought lives via an omniscient narrator, the thought lives of his other characters become the mystery which Antonio Parr attempts to discern. As such, Antonio’s discoveries of truths about himself are invariably arrived at through his endeavors to understand and read those around him.

In her study of the work of Buechner, titled Frederick Buechner: theologian and novelist of the lost and found, Marjorie Casebier McCoy writes that incarnation ‘is an underlying theme in all Buechner’s work, as insight into ourselves, our companions, and God emerges in unexpected places’. Concerning the tetralogy, she suggests that the element of ‘incarnational surprise’ is present in the moment at which its characters meet one another. Literary critic Dale Brown, in his companion to the works of Frederick Buechner, The Book of Buechner, writes that the Bebb tetralogy ‘continues with the questions dominating all of Buechner’s work’. These, he suggests, are: Belief versus unbelief, the ambiguities of life, the nature of sin, human lostness, spiritual homesickness, the quest for self-identity, the need for self-revelation, the search for meaning, and the possibility of joy.

Marie-Hélène Davies suggests that The Book of Bebb "reveals the preposterousness of life and the amazing grace of the God who sustains it."

== Composition ==
Lion Country was the second novel composed by Buechner while in residence at his family home in Vermont. In his autobiographical work, Now and Then (1983), Buechner remembers the inception of the novel:

I was reading a magazine as I waited my turn at a barber shop one day when, triggered by a particular article and the photographs that went with it, there floated up out of some hitherto unexplored sub-cellar of me a character who was to dominate my life as a writer for the next six years and more.

Critic Dale Brown adds further detail regarding the ‘particular article’ that Buechner found so compelling, noting that it was a 'Life magazine exposé of the Reverend Doctor Herman Keck Jr.', pastor of Calvary Grace Christian Church, based in Fort Lauderdale, Florida. Brown notes that he was ‘Famous for his advertisement, “Answer God’s call – start preaching today,” and for the mail-order theology degrees he dispensed to all who could pay the fees.' Concerning the character of Bebb, who would be one of the author’s most popular and enduring creations, in Now and Then Buechner claimed that the process of writing the Bebb tetralogy, particularly Lion Country, was 'a process much less of invention than that of discovery'. He continues:

It floated up out of my dreaming so charged with a life of its own that there was a sense in which almost all I had to do was sit back and watch it unfold. Instead of having to force myself to go back to it every morning as I had with novels in the past, I could hardly wait to go back to it; and instead of taking something like two years to write as the earlier ones had, it was all done in just short of three months.

For Buechner, the character of Bebb appears to have held a particular personal significance. In Now and Then he writes: 'Bebb was strong in most of the places where I was weak, and mad as a hatter in most of the places where I was all too sane. Bebb took terrible risks with his life where I hung back with mine and hoped no one would notice.'

Elsewhere in Now and Then, Buechner claims that this fascination with the character of Bebb ‘supremely and without any question’ became the driving force behind his immediate commencement with a second novel centered around the mercurial preacher, and subsequently a third and, finally, a fourth.

== Critical reception ==
The most widely reviewed novel of the tetralogy was undoubtedly Lion Country. Dale Brown suggests that the reason for this is found in the growing perception among critics that Buechner was a novel-writing preacher, which led to a decrease in interest from literary reviewers as the series progressed: ‘In reviews and critical pieces from the mid-1960s forward', he writes, ‘Buechner the novelist was consistently associated with Buechner the minister'. Brown further notes that: ‘The insidious suggestion that the one calling precluded the other must have cost Buechner some readers in one venue, though the mix of novelist and believer would eventually cultivate readers in another venue'. Brown further argues that this critical predilection for finding homilies in Buechner’s fiction is unfair, and largely unsupported by the novels themselves: ‘I’d be hard pressed to believe’, he writes, ‘that any uninformed readers of The Book of Bebb imagined that a minister was pulling the string behind the curtain’. David R. Ebitt strongly agrees with this assessment, asserting that:

To describe Lion Country as deeply religious novel is to risk turning away some readers who would enjoy it enormously. For it is a novel of chicanery and sex, or exhibitionism and infanticide. Frederick Buechner has been writing good books for a long time. He was never written a better one.

Despite the common suggestion that Buechner’s work was becoming increasingly Christian in tone and preoccupation, Brown points out that the manner in which Lion Country was received by critics was generally ‘extremely positive’. Indeed, in his review of Lion Country James Dickey argued that:

Frederick Buechner is one of our finest writers. He has produced a body of work as impressive as any American writer currently practicing the art of fiction. Lion Country […] has many morals, not the least being that a constantly entertaining novel can also deal successfully with the most serious ideas.

William Pritchard’s write-up in the Hudson Review stated that Lion Country is a ‘powerful and beautiful creation’, a conclusion echoed by Rosemary F. Deen, who suggested in her review, published in Commonweal, that Bebb constituted a ‘masterful creation of the improbable genuineness of a latter-day apostle, a tarnished Daniel among the Babylonian lions’. Deen adds that this new prose is ‘economically written, easy and humorous in the best way without any sacrifice of seriousness.’ Buechner’s altered writing style in Lion Country drew further comment from reviewers, including Guy Davenport, who declared that it was ‘beautifully written and told with the mastery of a craftsman’. Martin Waldron even suggested that, ‘This sometimes explosively funny novel reads as if it were plotted by Nathanael West or James Agee, with dialogue by Peter de Vries.’ Noting that the novel is ‘very different from anything else this major writer has yet produced’, Barbara Bannon writes that ‘Lion Country is a human comedy of complexity and persuasion […] two quite disparate elements fuse brilliantly in a novel that is genuinely entertaining and also genuinely moving.’ Both Harry T. Moore and Reynolds Price are similarly laudatory, the former claiming that ‘Buechner now reaches a new high level with the absorbing, tender and comic Lion Country’, the latter that:

Lion Country is Frederick Buechner's richest work, an unprecedented comedy which resounds with a depth and length that reconfirm not only his high position among living novelists, but our overdue doubt of attention and gratitude to him for craft, stamina, wisdom, and now laughter.

With the introduction of this new stylistic direction came a number of interesting comparisons between Lion Country and works by other authors. Alvin Beam noted a certain resemblance between the tone and approach taken by Buechner in Lion Country and the work of John Donne. Writing for Best Sellers, P.A. Doyle made a comparison slightly closer to home, remarking that the novel was reminiscent of the work of Flannery O’Connor. A number of reviewers commented on Buechner’s juxtaposition of the sacred and the profane: Geoffrey Wolfe wrote that ‘Buechner has turned upon sacred matters a most wonderfully secular, often profane, fancy’, while Rose Jeanne found that ‘Bawdy humor and symbolic mysticism make strange partners, but Mr. Buechner has mated them surprisingly well’. Beyond Lion Country, the other three constituent parts of The Book of Bebb also drew praise from critics. Literary critic Michael Putney called Open Heart ‘a wise book’, writing that this ‘extraordinary new novel’ was ‘antic, introspective, belly-laughing funny, eerily other-worldly, ribald, and devout.’ In a review published by the Library Journal, B.M. Firestone wrote of Treasure Hunt that:

There’s a little of everything here: UFO’s, life rays, and karmic fields; philosophy and theosophy; Messiahs that run the gamut from Christ to the Lone Ranger….Treasure Hunt is a rare find, a serious novel that never seems serious. Buechner laces his sermons with humor, with irony, even with fantasy. In this journey south, it’s hard to tell the homilies from the grits.

The tetralogy as a whole drew positive reflections from a number of critics, including Roger Dione, who argued in the Los Angeles Times that Buechner remained ‘one of the most underrated novelists writing today’. This sentiment was repeated by several other reviewers, including Louis Auchinloss, who contended that ‘Frederick Buechner can find grace and redemption even in the shoddiest, phoniest aspects of a cultural wasteland.’ Benjamin Demott’s review of the tetralogy, published in the Atlantic, made comparisons between The Great Gatsby and The Book of Bebb, particularly in the ‘two centers’ that revolved around one another in each novel, ‘not merely the major Bebb but the minor Antonio’. Finally, in her wide-ranging study of Buechner’s work, titled Frederick Buechner: theologian and novelist of the lost and found, Marjorie Casebier McCoy concludes that, in The Book of Bebb, Buechner skilfully captures the struggles of human existence:

Life and death are wrestling throughout the Bebb stories, as indeed they are contending with one another in Buechner’s experience and in the experience of all of us, if we have awareness enough to notice or have been jolted into awareness by someone such as Bebb.
