= Leo Bebb =

Fictional character

Leo Bebb is a fictional clergyman who is featured in The Book of Bebb, a tetralogy by Frederick Buechner. Cynthia Ozick calls him a "lustily flawed hero".

== Background ==
Leo Bebb is the head of a religious diploma mill in Florida who had once served five years in a prison on a charge of exposing himself before a group of children. Buechner says of Bebb that "he came, unexpected and unbidden, from a part of myself no less mysterious and inaccessible than the part where dreams come from." Leland Ryken, Philip Ryken, and Todd Wilson note that "to a minister as flamboyant as Bebb, image is everything, so he hides his sordid past behind 'Gospelese' and benevolent acts."

== Physical appearance ==
When Bebb is first introduced, in Lion Country, he is described as follows:

A workable, Tweedledum mouth with the lines at the corners, the hinge marks, making an almost perfect H with the tight lips. A face plump but firm, pale but not sick pale. He was high-polish bald and had hardly a trace of facial hair, beard or eyebrows even. The eyes were jazzy and wide open and expectant, as if he'd just pulled a rabbit out of a hat or was waiting for me to.

== Evaluation ==
W. Dale Brown asks the question,

"Is it possible that the unlikeliest of vessels, the obvious shyster, that round ball of contradictions and failings, could function as an instrument of grace?"

Brown goes on to suggest that "Buechner's repeated use of ambiguous protagonists as channels of grace suggests Graham Greene, J. F. Powers and Robertson Davies."
