= Marriage commissioner =

Officials empowered to perform Civil Marriage ceremonies

The duties of a Marriage Commissioner or Deputy Marriage Commissioner vary between jurisdictions.

Deputy or temporary marriage commissioners are generally empowered to perform Civil Marriage ceremonies during a fixed time and/or in a fixed place. Most often, these are officials for a specific marriage where the couple wants someone special to perform the ceremony, after which their appointment expires.

Other times, however, a deputy can be employed by the county clerk to perform civil ceremonies when regular staff are unable to do so or are overwhelmed. Such was the case in February–March 2004 in San Francisco, California where dozens of volunteers helped alleviate the backlog of same-sex couples seeking marriages.

In some jurisdictions, a civil authority recognised to solemnise marriage (such as the clerk of a county or municipality) is empowered to delegate that authority to one or a handful of marriage commissioners on a long-term basis; in other jurisdictions, the appointments are made by a province or state government agency.

Splitting the marriage commissioner tasks from those of judge, city clerk or minister of religion can provide couples more flexibility in choosing a venue for a wedding; instead of bringing the couple to a church, town hall or court house, a local commissioner may use their own transport to go to the chosen site of a destination wedding.

== By jurisdiction ==
=== United States ===
- Alaska Statute 25.05.261(a)(2) 1, allows anyone 18 years of age or older (including friends, relatives or non-residents of the United States) to perform a marriage ceremony if they first obtain a marriage commissioner appointment from an Alaskan court. The marriage license application and instructions are available on the Vital Statistics website.
- In California, the Clerk-Recorder of an individual county is empowered to allow individuals to be deputized for a day to perform one individual civil (non-religious) wedding ceremony. Use of these powers varies between counties; Santa Cruz offers a Deputy Commissioner of Civil Marriages for a Day Program.

=== Canada ===
- Alberta Vital Statistics appoints Marriage Commissioners provincially for a five-year term. A Judge, MLA, MP, Senator or (active or former) permanent Marriage Commissioner from any Canadian jurisdiction may be appointed Temporary Marriage Commissioner for a day.
- British Columbia has 340 provincially appointed Marriage Commissioners, who serve a five-year term. There are no Temporary Marriage Commissioners.
- In Manitoba, the status of Marriage Commissioner is granted by application to the provincial Vital Statistics department with no temporary commissioners. As of 2004, there were 600 marriage commissioners in the province Unlike ministers of religion, provincially appointed civil marriage commissioners are required to solemnise same-sex marriage on an equal, non-discriminatory basis.
- Ontario Regulation 285/04 authorises the Clerk of an incorporated municipality to solemnize marriages; the clerk may delegate this authority long-term to a handful of marriage commissioners who provide civil marriage solemnization services to couples.
